= List of Christian missionaries =

The following are notable Christian missionaries:

== Early Christian missionaries ==
These are missionaries who predate the Second Council of Nicaea so it may be claimed by both Catholic and Orthodoxy or belonging to early Christian groups.

- Alopen – first missionary to China (Nestorian)
- Apollos
- Augustine of Canterbury – missionary to England
- Saint Barnabas
- Saint Boniface – influential in the conversion of German peoples
- Columba – early missionary to Scotland
- Saint Denis – early missionary to France
- Frumentius – early missionary to Ethiopia
- Saint Kilian – Irish missionary killed in Franconia
- Mark the Evangelist
- Luke the Evangelist
- Pantaenus – early missionary to India
- Saint Patrick – early missionary to Ireland
- Saint Paul
- Twelve Apostles – all of the twelve are considered missionaries
- Ulfilas – missionary to the Goths

== Medieval to modern missionaries ==
=== Anglican ===
- Geoffrey Bingham – missionary in Pakistan
- James Blair – Scottish-born American clergyman in the Virginia Colony, founder of the College of William & Mary
- William Duncan – worked with the Tsimshians
- James Hannington – saint in Anglicanism who was killed in Uganda
- Richard Johnson – first Christian cleric in Australia
- Francis Le Jau, missionary to South Carolina
- Samuel Lyde – missionary to the Alawites of Syria
- Robert Machray – clergyman and missionary and first Primate of the Church of England in Canada
- Samuel Marsden – missionary to Australia
- Henry Martyn – missionary to India
- William Mitchell – missionary to India
- Charles Pearson – pioneer of the Church of Uganda
- Charles Stewart Thompson – missionary to India
- Henry Townsend – missionary in West Africa
- Cecil Tyndale-Biscoe – missionary in Kashmir
- John Wesley – missionary/evangelist in Europe and America
- Walter Weston – missionary to Japan, popularized the term "Japanese Alps"
- George Whitefield – missionary/evangelist to the colonial United States
- John Burdett Wittenoom – missionary to Australia

=== Baptist ===
- Ellen Arnold – Australian Missionary
- Gladys Aylward – missionary in China and Taiwan
- Anne Luther Bagby – Southern Baptist missionary to Brazil
- Lauran Bethell – missionary to Thailand and Eastern Europe
- Joseph Booth – missionary to what is now Malawi
- William Carey (missionary) – missionary in India Founder of the baptist missionary society
- William Goldsack - missionary to East Bengal India
- Adoniram Judson – American missionary to Burma whose conversion to Baptist beliefs en route to the mission field led to the founding of the first Baptist association in the U.S.
- Ann Hasseltine Judson – wife of Adoniram Judson and missionary in Burma. Translated portions of the Bible into Burmese
- Chow Leung – missionary to Chicago Chinatown
- George Liele – first American missionary; served in Jamaica
- Isaac McCoy – missionary to the American Indians
- Eleanor Macomber – American missionary to Burma
- Daniel Sharpe Malekebu – Malawian missionary who served in Malawi
- Lottie Moon – Southern Baptist missionary to China
- Hopestill Pillow – New Zealand female missionary to India in the 19th century, member of the Zenana Missions
- Anna Seward Pruitt – part of the "missionary generation" in America, Southern Baptist missionary who worked with Lottie Moon in North China
- Cicero Washington Pruitt – Southern Baptist missionary to North China
- Issachar Jacox Roberts – Baptist missionary who, at first unintentionally, inspired Hong Xiuquan
- William Ward (missionary) – Missionary and printer in India

=== Plymouth Brethren ===
- Jim Elliot – missionary to Ecuador
- Anthony Norris Groves - missionary to Baghdad
- George Müller – preached in various countries

=== Congregationalists ===
- William Scott Ament – controversial missionary to China
- Thomas J. Arnold - missionary in China during the Qing dynasty
- David Bogue – missionary to India, convert from the Church of Scotland
- Samuel Dyer – 19th-century China
- William Ellis – missionary to the South Pacific and an author
- Cynthia Farrar – missionary to India, 1827–1862
- Cyrus Hamlin – American missionary in Turkey
- Griffith John - missionary in China and companion of Jonathan Goforth
- Mary Greenleaf Clement Leavitt - first world missionary for Woman's Christian Temperance Union
- David Livingstone – missionary and explorer in Africa
- Walter Henry Medhurst – revised versions of the Bible for his mission in China
- Luella Miner - missionary in China, 1887 to 1935
- Robert Moffat – Scottish missionary to Africa
- Peter Parker – missionary and doctor in 19th-century China
- Ellen M. Stone - missionary, teacher, author remembered for the Miss Stone Affair
- Arthur Henderson Smith – missionary and author, more than 50 years in China
- Betsey Stockton – missionary to Hawaii; a freed slave who was one of the first American single women to go on a foreign mission
- Lancelot Threlkeld – linguist and missionary linked to the Lake Macquarie mission
- Mary E. Van Lennep – missionary to Smyrna and Constantinople
- Charlotte White - missionary to India, 1816-1826
- John Williams – congregationalist in the South Pacific

=== Methodist ===
- Young John Allen – missionary in Qing China
- Henry Gerhard Appenzeller - American Methodist missionary to Korea
- Francis Burns – missionary to Liberia
- Thomas Coke – the first Methodist bishop
- Shoshi Mukhi Das – missionary of the Welsh Calvinistic Methodist Church, teacher and nurse
- Thomas Birch Freeman – Anglo-African missionary and colonial official in West Africa
- Francis Dunlap Gamewell – chief of fortifications, Boxer Rebellion, China
- Mary Ninde Gamewell – American missionary in China; writer
- Mary Porter Gamewell – American missionary in China
- George Richmond Grose – missionary to China
- Joseph Crane Hartzell – missionary work in Africa
- Gertrude Howe – American teaching missionary in China
- William Hughlett – medical missionary to Africa
- E. Stanley Jones – missionary to India
- Walter Russell Lambuth – established missionary schools and hospitals in East Asia
- Mary Ann Lyth – English missionary, translator, teacher
- J. P. Martin – children's book writer and missionary in Africa
- Pilipo Miriye – missionary to Nigeria
- Sioeli Nau – missionary work in Fiji and Tonga
- Samson Oppong – Ghanaian prophet-preacher
- Mary Reed – missionary to India
- Dorothy Ripley – missionary to the United States
- Samuel Evans Rowe – missionary work in Africa
- Isaiah Benjamin Scott – African-American missionary to Liberia
- William B. Scranton - American Methodist missionary to Korea
- William Taylor (missionary) – Reverend who became Bishop in Africa during the latter half of the 19th century

=== Moravian ===
- Alexander Worthy Clerk – Jamaican Moravian missionary to the Gold Coast, now Ghana
- Christian David – Moravian missionary in Greenland, Livland and Pennsylvania
- Johann Leonhard Dober - missionary in St. Thomas in the Caribbean
- Anna Rosina Gambold – Moravian missionary in Georgia; diarist
- Rose Ann Miller – Jamaican Moravian educator and missionary to the Gold Coast, now Ghana
- Catherine Mulgrave – Angolan-Jamaican educator and missionary to the Gold Coast, now Ghana
- Anna Nitschmann – Moravian missionary
- David Nitschmann der Bischof – Moravian bishop and missionary in Pennsylvania
- Christian Jacob Protten – Gold Coast educator and missionary
- Rebecca Protten – Caribbean Moravian evangelist and missionary to the Gold Coast
- August Gottlieb Spangenberg – head of the Moravian Church in America in its early days
- David Zeisberger – Moravian missionary known for his role in the history of the Christian Munsee
- Nicolaus Zinzendorf – Founder of the Moravian church

=== Presbyterian ===
- William Chalmers Burns – missionary to China
- Nicholas Timothy Clerk – Presbyterian missionary in southeast colonial Ghana
- Samuel Cochran – American missionary to China
- Harvie M. Conn - American missionary to Korea and a missiologist
- Hunter Corbett – pioneer American missionary to Yantai, Shandong China and Moderator of the General Assembly 1906
- Alexander Duff – missionary in India
- William Montague Ferry - Presbyterian missionary who was stationed on Mackinac Island.
- George Ashmore Fitch – American missionary to China and Korea
- Donald Fraser – Free Church of Scotland missionary to Malawi
- John Lawrence Goheen – Presbyterian missionary, administer of Ichalkaranji state of British India
- Robert Grierson – Canadian missionary to Korea
- Mary Coombs Greenleaf – American missionary who worked among the Chickasaw Indians
- Peter Hall – Presbyterian missionary in colonial Ghana
- William Imbrie – American missionary to Japan
- Lloyd Kim - American missionary to Cambodia and the coordinator of Mission to the World
- Samuel Kirkland – American Revolution figure who did missionary work among the Tuscarora
- Eric Liddell – Olympic athlete who became a Scottish missionary in China
- William Alderman Linton - American missionary to Korea
- Susan Law McBeth – Presbyterian missionary to American Indians and author
- Alexander Murdoch Mackay – Presbyterian missionary to Uganda
- George Leslie Mackay – among the first modern missionaries to Taiwan
- James Laidlaw Maxwell – among the first modern missionaries to Taiwan
- Samuel Austin Moffett - American missionary to Korea and founder of Presbyterian Theological Seminary in Pyongyang
- Samuel H. Moffett - American missionary to Korea and faculty at Princeton Theological Seminary
- Robert Morrison – first Protestant missionary in China
- John Livingston Nevius - American missionary in China who advocated the Nevius Principle
- Michael Oh - American missionary to Japan and executive director of Lausanne Committee for World Evangelization
- John Gibson Paton – Scottish missionary to "the New Hebrides" (now part of Vanuatu)
- Gladstone Porteous – Australian missionary to China of Scottish descent
- Francis Young Pressly – American missionary to Punjab, Pakistan 1945–1972
- Carl Christian Reindorf - Gold Coast historian, minister and missionary
- William D. Reynolds - American missionary to Korea
- David Earl Ross - American missionary to Korea and founder of Jesus Evangelism Band (YWAM Korea)
- Mary Slessor – Scottish Presbyterian missionary in Nigeria
- Absalom Sydenstricker – Presbyterian missionary to China, father of Pearl S. Buck
- Horace Grant Underwood – first Protestant missionary to Korea
- William James Wanless M.D., F.A.C.S – founded the first missionary medical school in India in 1897
- Aeneas Francon Williams (Rev) – Church of Scotland minister; missionary in the Eastern Himalayas and China
- Clara Anne Williams (ne. Rendall) – wife of Rev. Aeneas Francon Williams; Church of Scotland missionary in the Eastern Himalayas
- Ralph D. Winter - American missiologist and founder of the U.S. Center for World Mission
- Asher Wright – missionary to Native American Seneca people

=== Other Protestant ===
- David Asante – Gold Coast native linguist, educator and missionary
- Reinhard Bonnke – German charismatic Christian evangelist
- Paul Brand – missionary surgeon in India
- John Allen Chau – American Evangelical, killed by the Sentinelese people after he approached the island in hopes of converting them
- Emilie Christaller – German educator and Basel missionary to the Gold Coast
- Johann Gottlieb Christaller – German linguist and Basel missionary to the Gold Coast
- Aril Edvardsen – Norwegian evangelical preacher and missionary
- Jonathan Edwards - Missionary to the native Housatonic people of Massachusetts
- Hans Egede – Norwegian Lutheran missionary called "The Apostle of Greenland"
- John Eliot – Puritan missionary to the American Indians
- Leung Faat – Chinese convert who did missionary work in Southeast Asia and his homeland
- Mark Finley – Seventh-day Adventist Church
- Jason Frenn – contemporary missionary to Latin America
- Theodore Hamberg – Swedish missionary to China
- Hermann Herlitz – German pastor and missionary to Australia
- Regina Hesse – Gold Coast educator and missionary
- Hermann Gundert – German linguist and Basel missionary to India
- Robert A. Jaffray – Christian and Missionary Alliance missionary to China
- James Legge – Sinologist and missionary to China
- Eugen Liebendörfer – German medical missionary to India
- Johanna Meeuwsen – South African missionary of Dutch descent, the first single woman missionary of the Dutch Reformed Church (DRC) in the Transvaal
- William Miller – Second Advent Movement
- Wayman Mitchell – missionary and founder of Christian Fellowship Ministries
- Hermann Mögling – German missionary to India
- Volbrecht Nagel – German missionary to India
- Ludwig Ingwer Nommensen – Lutheran missionary to Sumatra
- Torill Selsvold Nyborg – Norwegian Lutheran missionary in Arequipa from 1977 to 1982
- Theophilus Opoku – Gold Coast native linguist, educator and missionary
- Jorge Armando Pérez – contemporary missionary to Latin America
- Hedvig Posse – Swedish missionary in South Africa, linguist and hymn writer
- Fritz Ramseyer – Swiss builder and missionary to the Gold Coast
- Andreas Riis – Danish minister and Basel missionary to the Gold Coast
- Susanna Carson Rijnhart – Canadian medical missionary to Tibet
- Helen Roseveare – missionary physician in the Congo
- Albert Shelton – Disciples of Christ missionary to Tibetans
- John Smith – abolitionist missionary to the West Indies
- Sarah Lanman Smith – Missionary to Syria and creator of the Lebanese American University
- Annie Royle Taylor – English missionary to China and Tibet
- Hudson Taylor – missionary in China
- George Peter Thompson – Liberian minister and Basel missionary to the Gold Coast
- James Springer White – Seventh-day Adventist Church
- Rosina Widmann – German educator and Basel missionary to the Gold Coast
- Johannes Zimmermann – German linguist and Basel missionary to the Gold Coast

=== Other Christian ===
- Heidi Baker – co-founder IRIS ministries
- Sigurd Bratlie – Brunstad Christian Church
- William F. P. Burton – missionary pioneering in the Congolian rainforests
- Loren Cunningham – founder of Youth with a Mission (YWAM)
- Stephen Grellet – Quaker missionary
- Thomas Raymond Kelly – Quaker
- Alexander Hugh Macmillan – Bible Student and Jehovah's Witness
- Robert Pierce – founder of World Vision International
- Ockert Potgieter – South African missionary to Ukraine
- Erika Sutter – Swiss missionary to South Africa

== See also ==
- List of Protestant missionaries in China
- List of Protestant missionaries in India
- List of Catholic missionaries
- List of Catholic missionaries to China
- List of Catholic missionaries in India
- List of Catholic missions in Africa
- List of missionaries to Hawaii
- List of missionaries to the South Pacific
- List of Slovenian missionaries
- List of Protestant missionaries to Southeast Asia
- List of Eastern Orthodox missionaries
- Timeline of Christian missions
