= Gamewell =

Gamewell may refer to:

== People ==
- Francis Dunlap Gamewell (1857–1950), American missionary in China
- Mary Ninde Gamewell (1858–1947), American missionary in China; writer
- Mary Porter Gamewell (1848–1906), American missionary in China
- John Gamewell, American inventor

== Places ==
- Gamewell, North Carolina, U.S.
