= Mary Gamewell =

Mary Gamewell may refer to:

- Mary Porter Gamewell (1848–1906), American missionary to China; also teacher, speaker, and writer
- Mary Ninde Gamewell (1858–1947), American missionary to China; also writer
