= Gambold =

Gambold is a surname. Notable people with the surname include:

- Anna Rosina Gambold (1762-1821), American Moravian missionary and diarist
- Fred Gambold (1868–1939), American film actor
- Bob Gambold (1929–2008), American football player and coach
