= Roy Hicks Jr. =

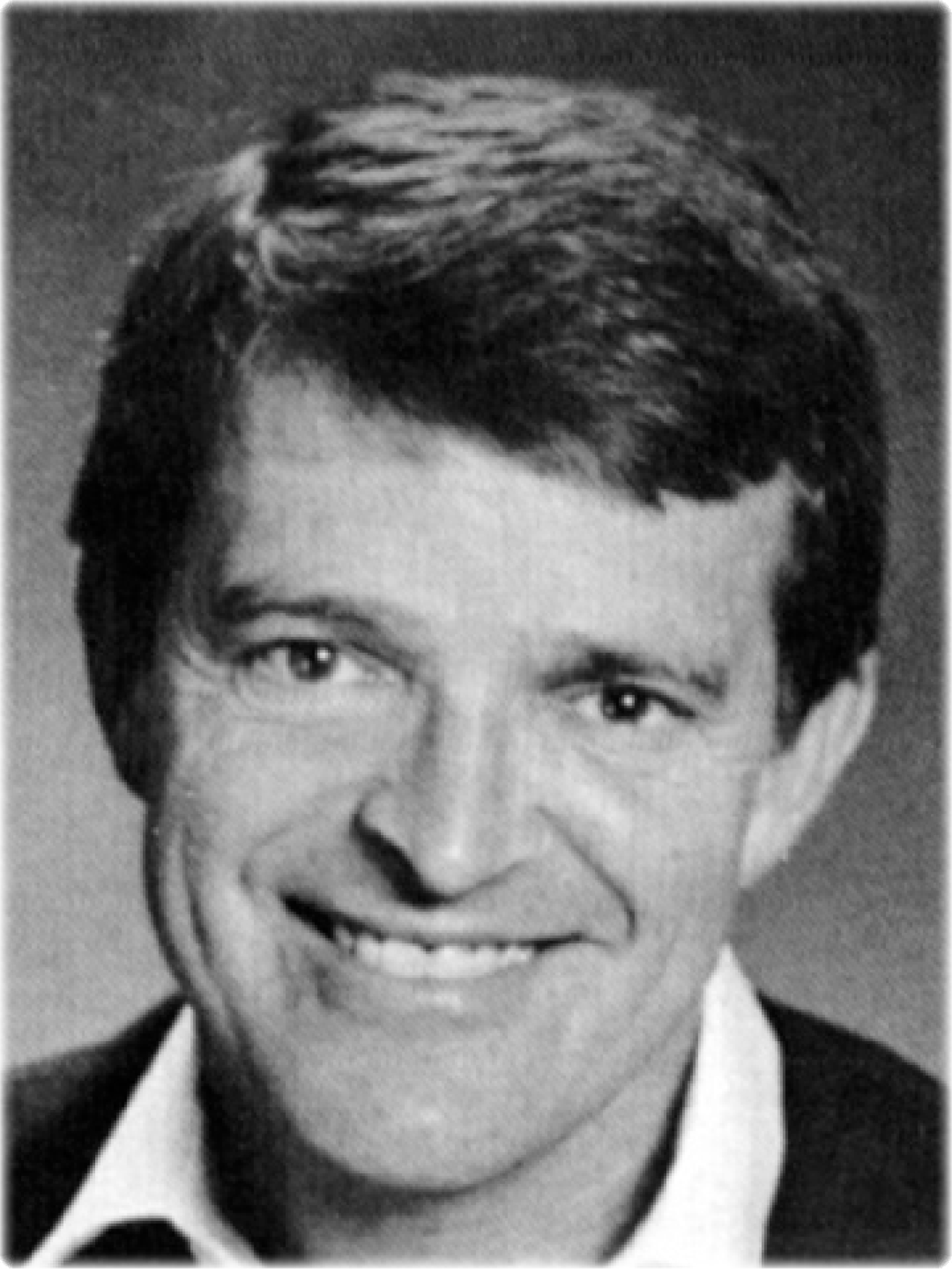
- Born: Roy Harmon Hicks Jr. December 21, 1943; Glendale, California, USA
- Died: February 10, 1994 (aged 50); Jackson County, Oregon, USA
- Known for: Pastor Faith Center, Eugene, Oregon

Roy Hicks Jr. was a pastor of Eugene Faith Center and important part of the International Church of the Foursquare Gospel during the 1970s through the 1990s. He also wrote several hymns including Praise the Name of Jesus inspired by Psalm 18. He died when the small plane he was piloting crashed in Jackson County, Oregon on Thursday, February 10, 1994, during a solo flight return from the Los Angeles area where he served with the Foursquare International Church.

== Family History ==
Roy Hicks Jr., born December 21, 1943, in Glendale, California, was the son of Margaret and Roy H. Hicks—a pastor, author of fifteen books and General Supervisor of the International Foursquare Churches. His father was well recognized as a speaker who was a "teacher of the Word," with a strong emphasis on faith, deliverance, and end times. He is survived by his wife Kay and his son Jeff.

== Ministry ==
At age twenty-five Roy Hicks took over a small church in Eugene, Oregon, and the number went down from 100 to 50 attendees. New people started coming and the church grew again. In 1969 the church moved to the corner of 13th and Polk Street in what had been a Seventh Day Church Academy. Fifty-nine churches were planted or pioneered out of the Eugene church. Many pastors speak about his influence on their ministries. Roy Hicks died in a private plane crash on February 10, 1994. More than 5000 people from all over the world attended his funeral at the Lane County Fair Grounds. Eugene Faith Center is now pastored by Russell Joyce.

The student center at Life Pacific College was named in honor of him.

== Bibliography ==
Books by Roy Hicks Jr. include:

- He Who Laughs, Lasts
- The Spirit-Filled Life Kingdom Dynamics Guides: K12-Power Faith
- A Small Book about God: His Ways, His Dreams, His Promises for You
- Healing Your Insecurities
- Use It or Lose It: The Word of Faith
