= Thompson Christian School =

Coordinates: 7°4′29.734″N 125°36′10.931″E

Location
- Lopez Jaena Street; Davao City, 8000; Philippines

Information
- School type: Private school
- Established: 1959
- Founders: Dr. Evelyn Thompson / Rev. Arthur Thompson
- Website: thompsonchristianschool.net

Thompson Christian School is a private school in Davao City, Philippines, founded by the International Church of the Foursquare Gospel. It provides a non-sectarian, non-stock, non-profit and non-political education.
