= Ronald D. Mehl =

Pastor Ron Mehl
- Ron Mehl
- Born: Ronald Duane Mehl; April 22, 1944; Breckenridge, Minnesota, US
- Died: May 30, 2003 (aged 59)
- Education: LIFE Bible College (now Life Pacific College)
- Occupations: Former senior pastor, Beaverton Foursquare Church; founder Compassion Ministries
- Known for: Largest congregation in Oregon, award-winning author, radio broadcast Heart of the Word

Ronald Duane Mehl (April 22, 1944 – May 30, 2003) was the senior pastor of the Beaverton Foursquare Church in Beaverton, Oregon, United States, from 1973 until his death in 2003.

Commonly known as Pastor Ron, Ron Mehl graduated from LIFE Bible College (now Life Pacific College) in 1966. That same year he married Joyce Hamrick, also a LIFE Bible college graduate. Pastor Ron and Joyce had two sons, Ron Jr. and Mark.

Mehl began his ministry service in June 1966 as a representative of LIFE Bible College, and became the Youth Pastor at the Portland Foursquare Church in September 1966. By 1969, he was serving as the youth director for the Great Lakes District in Kenosha, Wisconsin. Mehl left Kenosha in 1973 to become the senior pastor of the Beaverton Foursquare Church in Beaverton, Oregon. That first Sunday, only a dozen people attended service. Over the next 30 years, however, attendance on Sundays grew to over 6,000 people, resulting in the largest church congregation in Oregon in 1999.

Mehl held a variety of leadership positions within the International Church of the Foursquare Gospel, including serving for 25 years on the executive council, and for more than 20 years as superintendent of the Columbia West Division. While still senior pastor at Beaverton, the board of regents of LIFE Bible College called upon Mehl to serve as interim president, a position which he held from July 1992 until August 1994. He was also recognized as one of a handful of pastors helping the Foursquare church experience large growth in the 1970s.

== Awards and acknowledgements ==
- Conferred the Doctor of Divinity degree in 1985 by the International Church of the Foursquare Gospel
- At the request of Senator Mark Hatfield, delivered the Benediction prayer for the 104th Congress, Second Session to the Senate on May 21, 1996
- Two Gold Medallion awards in Christian Literature for God Works the Night Shift and Just in Case I Can’t Be There
- The Mehl Court Gymnasium, Life Pacific College (dedicated 2003)

== Published works ==
- Surprise Endings: Ten Good Things About Bad Things (Multnomah Publishers, 1993)
- God Works the Night Shift (Multnomah Publishers, 1994) – Gold Medallion Award, 1995
- Meeting God at a Dead End (Multnomah Publishers, 1996)
- What God Whispers in the Night (Multnomah Publishers, 1996, 2000)
- The Cure for a Troubled Heart: Meditations on Psalm 37 (Multnomah Publishers, 1996)
- The Ten(der) Commandments: Reflections on the Father’s Love (Multnomah Publishers, 1998)
- Love Found a Way: Stories of Christmas (Waterbrook Press, 1999)
- Just in Case I Can’t Be There (Multnomah Publishers, 1999) – Gold Medallion Award, 2000
- A Prayer That Moves Heaven (Multnomah Publishers, 2002)
- Right With God (Multnomah Publishers, 2003) – Chosen as the official 2003 National Day of Prayer theme book
- How God Decorates Heaven (Multnomah Publishers, 2003)
- Who Did It (Kregel Publications, 2004)
- The Greatest Gift: A Collection Devoted to Prayer (Multnomah Publishers, 2006, contributing author)
- After Words (Multnomah Publishers, 2006)
