= Sue McBeth Cabin =

Historic house in Idaho, United States

Coordinates: 46°12′18″N 116°0′22″W

- McBeth, Sue, Cabin
- U.S. National Register of Historic Places
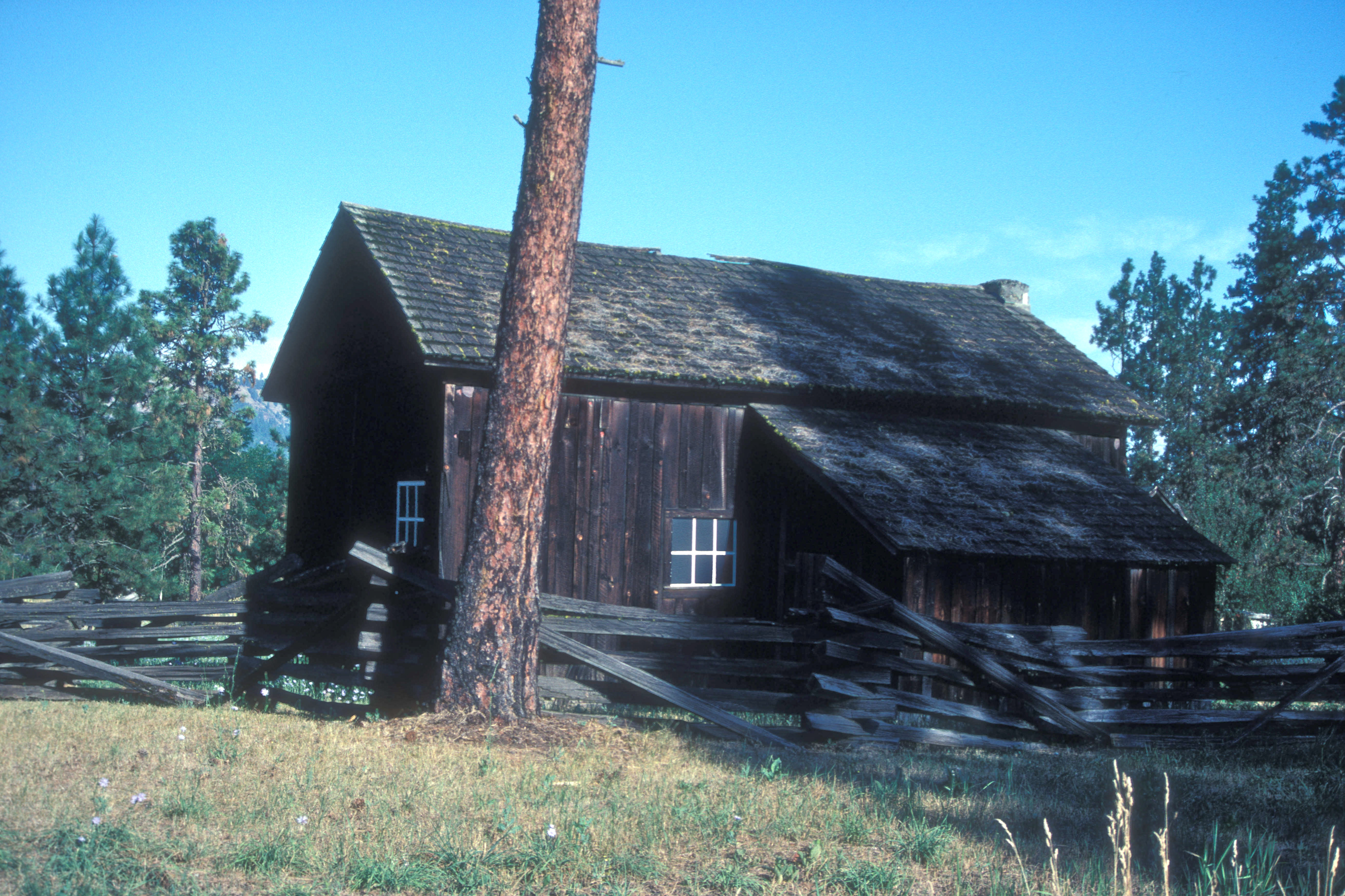

- Location within Idaho Location within the United States
- Location: Southeast of Kamiah on U.S. Route 12, in Idaho County, Idaho
- Area: less than one acre
- Built: {1880
- NRHP reference No.: 76000675
- Added to NRHP: June 3, 1976

The Sue McBeth Cabin on U.S. Route 12 in Idaho County, Idaho was listed on the National Register of Historic Places in 1976.

It is a one-story 24 by 16 feet (7.3 m × 4.9 m) frame building built in 1880, with a gabled roof. It has three rooms. Its exterior is board and batten and there is an exterior chimney.

It was built for Sue McBeth and was used by her during 1880-1885 as her home and as a schoolhouse in which she taught Nez Perce people to become leaders of their church, in the absence of missionaries.
