= Beaverton Foursquare Church =

Church in Oregon, United States

Coordinates: 45.505806°N 122.81539°W

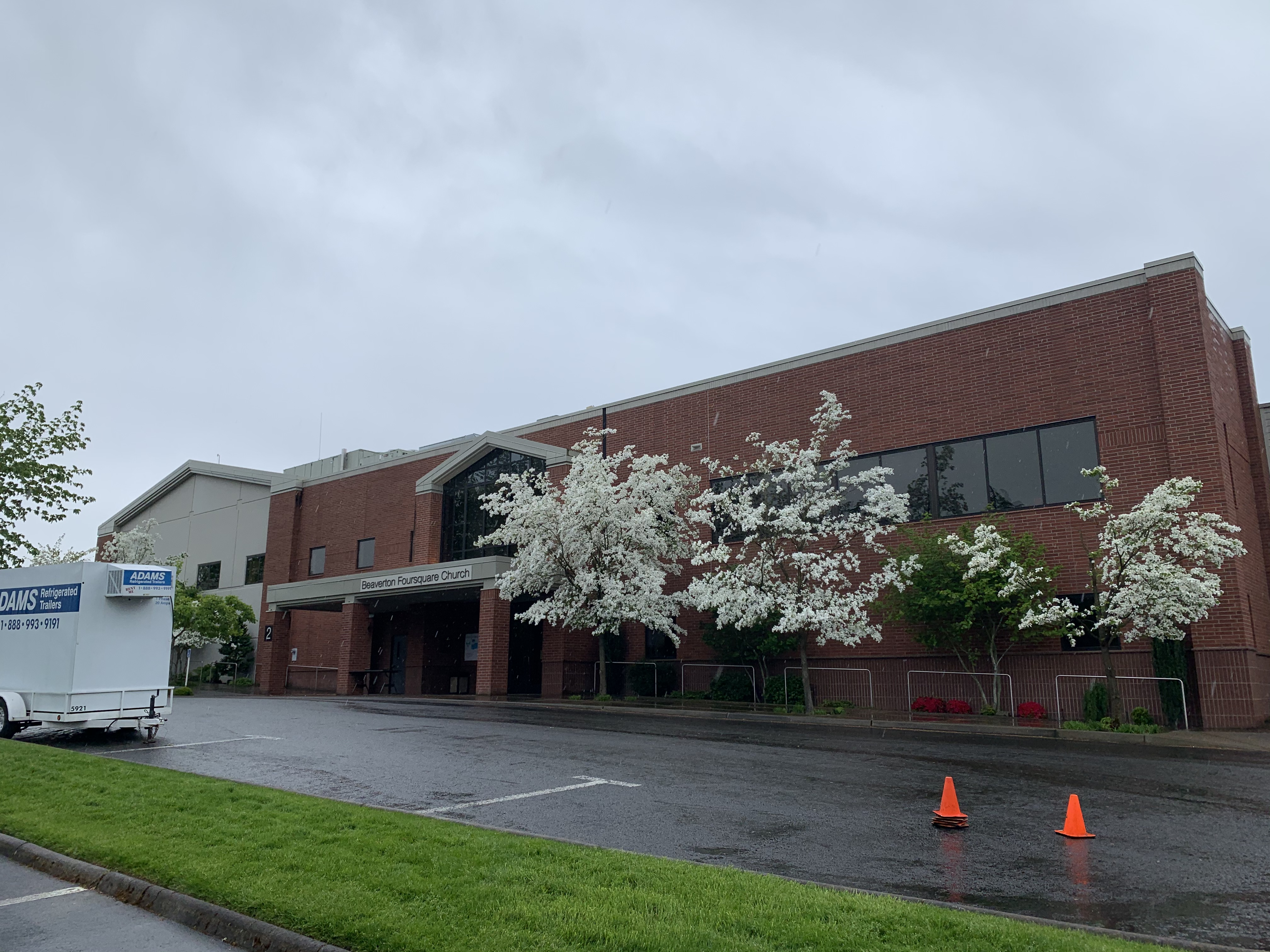
Outside of the church

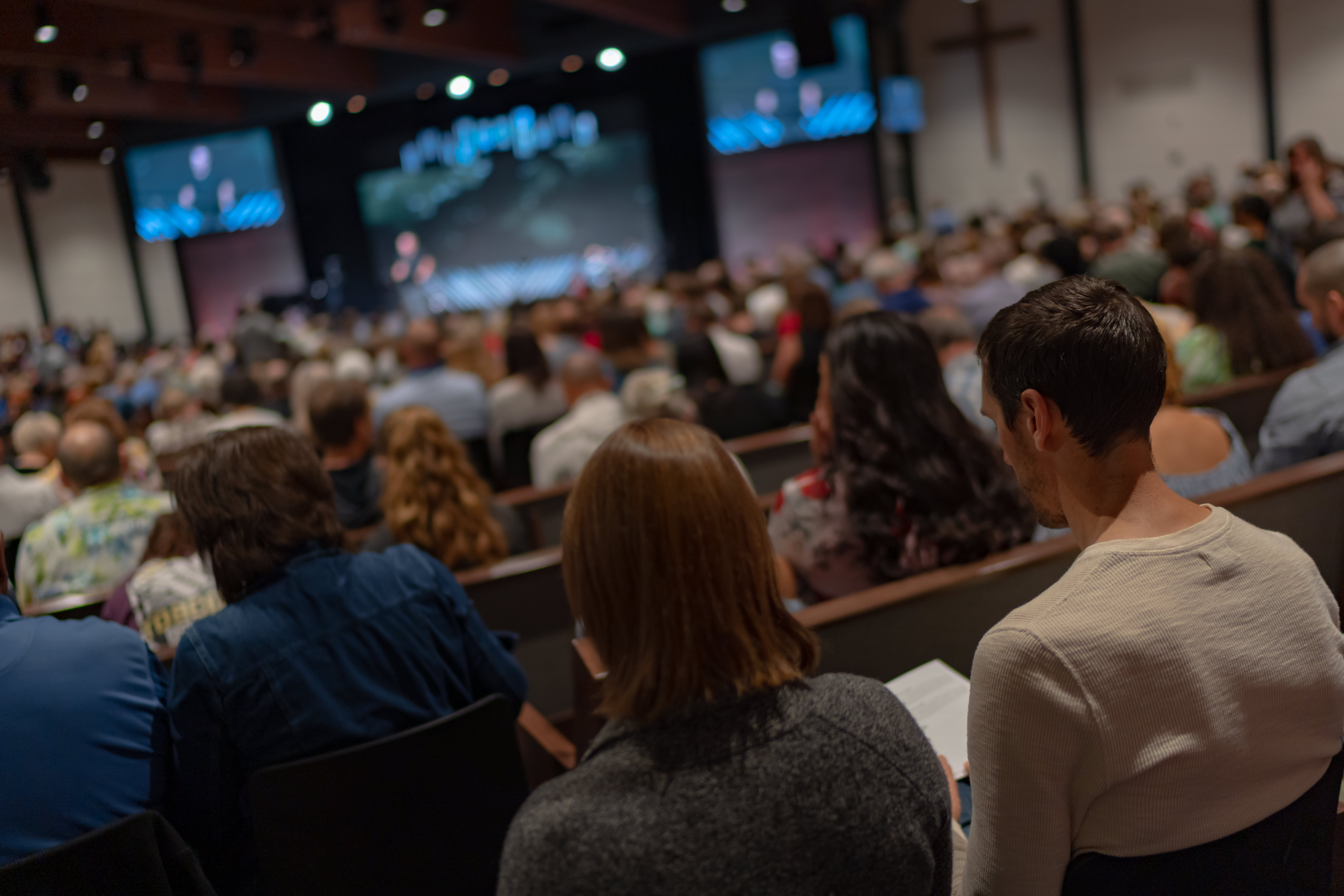
Sunday service in the worship center at Beaverton Foursquare (2019)

The Beaverton Foursquare Church, known also as B4Church or B4, is a Foursquare Pentecostal church located in Beaverton, Oregon, United States. Worship services at B4Church used to draw approximately 3,000 people weekly from a congregation numbering nearly 6000 in its prime.

== History ==
Beaverton Foursquare Church was founded by Bill Melton and his wife, Jean, in 1961. In 1964, the congregation purchased 10 acres (40,000 m^{2}) along Walker Road, which was then on the outskirts of Beaverton. The initial building project started in 1966 with the chapel being completed in 1968. The new building was dedicated by Rolf McPherson, son of Aimee Semple McPherson who founded the Foursquare denomination. The average weekly attendance at that time was 75 people.

In 1973, Ron Mehl took over leadership of the church. During his time of leadership, the weekly attendance increased to over 5,000 people. A number of new building projects were completed in order to accommodate the growth of the church. This growth also resulted in the Heart of the Word radio ministry, broadcasting the sermons from Pastor Mehl. The staff of the church also increased to include many pastors and other employees. By 2000, the church had grown to 6,000 and was the largest church in Oregon.

== Local Outreach ==
B4Church hosts a monthly Foster Parents' Night Out (FPNO) event which aims to provide date nights, and a break, to local foster families.

== COVID-19 Response ==
In response to COVID-19, B4Church partnered with other churches, the Beaverton School District, local government and the Oregon Food Bank to provide food boxes for hundreds of families in the area.

During the COVID-19 pandemic, B4Church began providing worship services entirely online. Services are available on the church website from 7:30am every Sunday.

== See also ==
- Megachurch
- Evangelicalism
