= William Xavier Ninde =

American Episcopal bishop (1832-1901)

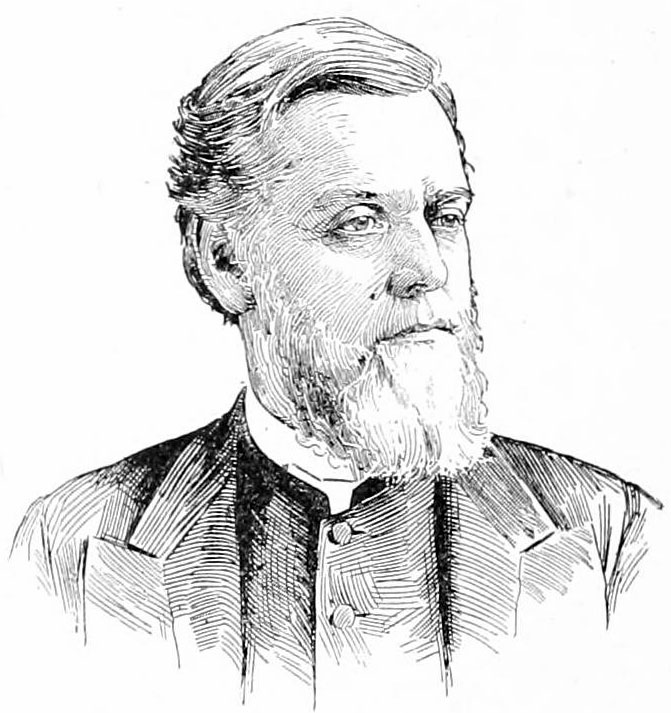
- Born: June 21, 1832; Cortland, New York, US
- Died: January 3, 1901 (aged 68); Detroit, Michigan, US
- Education: Wesleyan University
- Occupation: Bishop
- Spouse: Elizabeth S. Falley (m. 1857)
- Children: 4

Signature
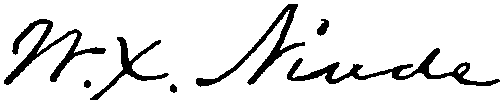

William Xavier Ninde (June 21, 1832 - January 3, 1901) was a bishop of the Methodist Episcopal Church (now the United Methodist Church).

== Biography ==
His father, William Ward Ninde, was a well-known Methodist preacher in New York State.

William Xavier Ninde graduated from Wesleyan University in Middletown, Connecticut, in 1855, and after teaching in Rome Academy (Rome, New York), entered the Methodist ministry in 1856. He served as pastor of churches in New York and Ohio, visited Europe and the orient in 1868-69, and in 1870 was transferred to the Detroit conference.

In 1873 he was appointed professor of practical theology at the Garrett Biblical Institute (Evanston, Illinois), where he served as president from 1879 to 1884. He served from 1876 until 1879 as pastor of the Central Methodist Episcopal Church (now the Central United Methodist Church) in Detroit. He was a delegate to the Methodist ecumenical conference in London in 1881, and on May 15, 1884 was elected bishop. He earned his D.D. from Wesleyan University in 1874 and an LL.D. from Northwestern University in 1892. He was an organizer of the Epworth League, and served as its second president (1896-1900).

== Family ==
He married Elizabeth S. Falley in 1857; the couple had four children. His daughter, Mary Ninde Gamewell, was a writer and served as a missionary in China; she wrote her father's biography.

His brother Henry S Ninde wrote the hymn Thou Didst Teach the Thronging People.

== Sources ==
- "F.D. Leete collection on William Xavier Ninde family: A Guide to the Collection". Texas Archival Resources Online.
- Rines, George Edwin, ed. (1920). "Ninde, William Xavier" . Encyclopedia Americana.
- Gilman, D. C.; Peck, H. T.; Colby, F. M., eds. (1905). "Ninde, William Xavier" . New International Encyclopedia (1st ed.). New York: Dodd, Mead.

Attribution:
