= Susan Law McBeth =

Presbyterian missionary to American Indians and author (1830 – 1893)

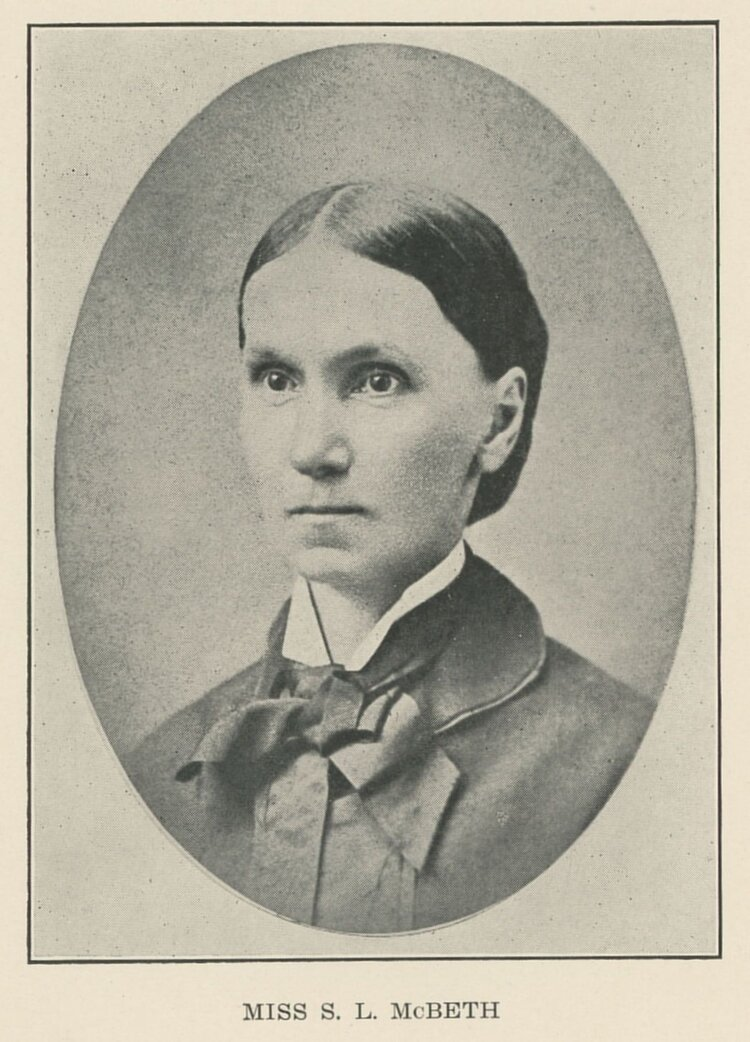
Susan Law McBeth

Susan Law McBeth (1830 – May 26, 1893) was the Presbyterian missionary to American Indians and author. She worked among the Choctaw in Indian Territory and, for two decades, among the Nez Perce in Idaho. She was fondly called as "little mother” by the Nez Perce.

== Biography ==
Born in 1830, at Doune, in south central Scotland, Susan Law McBeth was the daughter of stonemason Alexander McBeath of Perth and his wife Mary Henderson of Sterling. In 1832, her family emigrated to America and settled in Wellsville, Ohio. She studied at the Steubenville Female Seminary. After her graduation in 1854, she started her teaching career at the Wellsville Institute and worked for two years. She later took a teaching position at the Fairfield Female Seminary, Iowa. Her outstanding performance in teaching made her to become a staff of the Fairfield University, a branch of the State University of Iowa.

In 1858 the Board of Foreign Missions of the Presbyterian Church asked her to work with the Choctaw. She started her activities at the Goodwater Mission in Indian Territory teaching Indian girls from age six to 18. When the outbreak of Civil War interrupted her mission, she returned to Fairfield University where she became its temporary assistant director.

In 1863 she became one of the first female agents of the United States Christian Commission, a Protestant-affiliated medical relief organization, which provided medical assistance to the Civil War soldiers stationed at Jefferson Barracks, near St. Louis, Missouri. After the war in 1866, she stayed at the church of Dr. James Brooks in St. Louis. She helped him to establish home for working girls, many of them were newcomers to the city, and forced to accept sub-standard wages as seamstresses.

After her mother’s death in 1873, she returned to missionary work among the Nez Percé Indians in Idaho, and served for two decades until her death in 1893. In 1879 her younger sister, Kate McBeth (1833 – 1915), joined her at Lapwai, and opened a school for women. Susan briefly taught at Lapwai Agency. She then went to Kamiah to take over the work of Henry Harmon Spalding in training Indian men for the ministry. She trained numerous pastors including James Hayes, Archie B. Lawyer, Enoch Pond, Mark Williams, and Robert Williams. The cabin that she lived in, Sue McBeth Cabin, was listed on the National Register of Historic Places in 1976.

She assisted Alice C. Fletcher, American ethnologist, who was appointed by the federal government to individually distribute the tribally held Nez Perce land under the Dawes Severalty Act of 1887. She compiled but did not complete a dictionary of Nez Perce language, which was sent to the Smithsonian Institution after her death. During the war years she also wrote tracts for soldiers, which was published as Seeds Scattered Broadcast in 1869.

She died on May 26, 1893, in Mount Idaho, and was buried near the Kamiah Mission Church. After Susan died, Kate continued the missionary work until her own death in 1915.
