= Foursquare Church =

Pentecostal denomination

International Church of the Foursquare Gospel
- Jesus Christ the Savior, Baptizer, Healer, Coming King
- Classification: Protestant
- Orientation: Pentecostal
- Theology: Finished Work Pentecostal; Full Gospel
- Polity: Episcopal
- President: Randy Remington
- Associations: Pentecostal/Charismatic Churches of North America; Pentecostal World Fellowship; National Association of Evangelicals; Wesleyan Holiness Consortium
- Region: 150 countries
- Headquarters: Los Angeles, California
- Founder: Aimee Semple McPherson
- Origin: 1923; Los Angeles, California
- Separated from: Assemblies of God
- Separations: Open Bible Churches; Calvary Chapel; Pentecostal Missionary Church of Christ (4th Watch); Potter’s House Christian Fellowship (The Door)
- Congregations: 67,500
- Members: 8.8 million
- Other name: The Foursquare Church
- Official website: foursquare.org

The Foursquare Church is an international Pentecostal Christian denomination founded in 1923 by evangelist Aimee Semple McPherson. It lies within the evangelical tradition. Its headquarters are in Los Angeles, California, United States. The legal name of the organization is "the International Church of the Foursquare Gospel"

== History ==
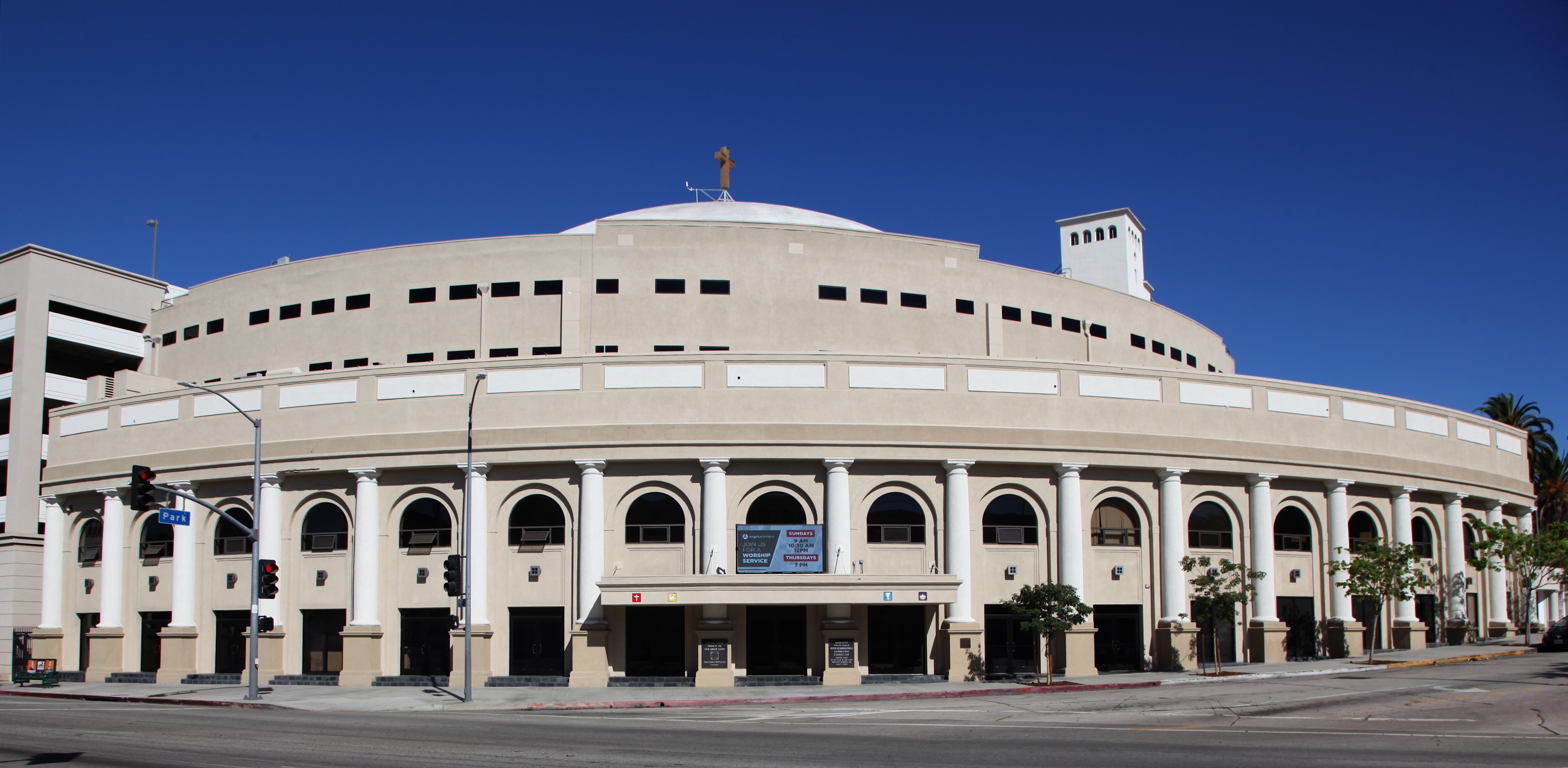
Angelus Temple, built by Aimee Semple McPherson and dedicated January 1, 1923. The temple is opposite Echo Park, near downtown Los Angeles, California.

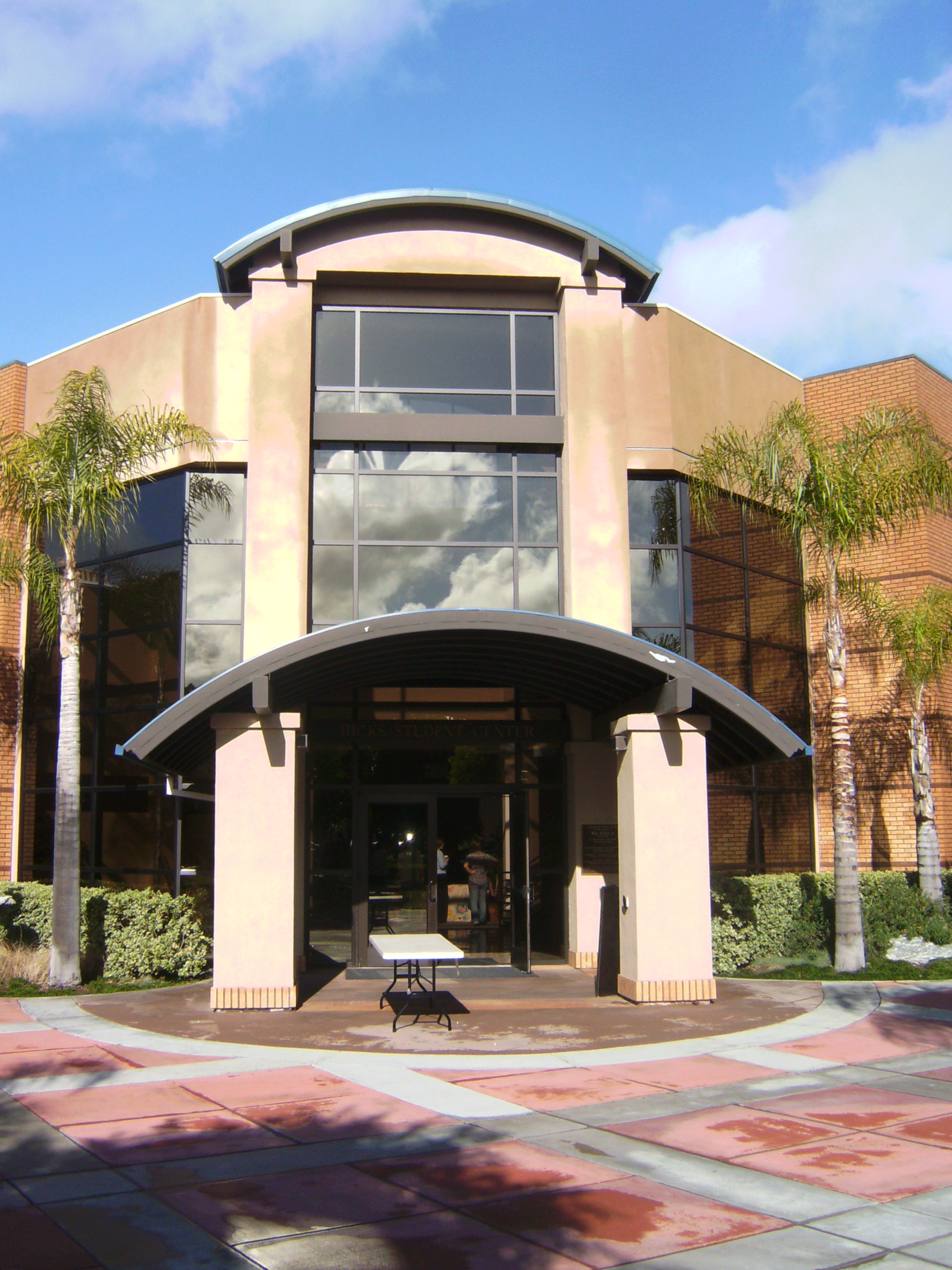
Hicks Center, Life Pacific University in San Dimas, California, United States

The church has its origins in a vision of "Foursquare Gospel" (or "Full Gospel") during a sermon in October 1922 in Oakland, California, by the evangelist Aimee Semple McPherson who was originally an ordained evangelist of the Assemblies of God where she once exerted a large influence until the split. According to chapter 1 of Book of Ezekiel, Ezekiel had a vision of God as revealed to be four different aspects: a man, a lion, an ox and an eagle. It also represents the four aspects of Christ: "Savior, Baptizer with the Holy Spirit, Healer and Soon and Coming King." This was the vision and name she gave at Foursquare Church, founded in January 1923 in Los Angeles, during the dedication of the Angelus Temple in Echo Park, seating 5,300 people. Despite some affinities with Pentecostals, her beliefs are interdenominational. The attendance has become a megachurch with 10,000 people. McPherson was a flamboyant celebrity in her day, participating in publicity events, such as weekly Sunday parades through the streets of Los Angeles, along with the mayor and movie stars, directly to Angelus Temple. She built the temple, as well as what is now known as Life Pacific University adjacent to it, on the northwest corner of land that she owned in the middle of the city.

McPherson's celebrity status continued after her death, with biopics such as the 1976 Hallmark Hall of Fame drama The Disappearance of Aimee depicting her life, as well as the 2006 independent film Aimee Semple McPherson, which particularly focused on her month-long disappearance in May–June 1926 and the legal controversy that followed.

After Aimee Semple McPherson's death in 1944, her son Rolf K. McPherson became president and leader of the church, a position he held for 44 years. The Foursquare Church formed the Pentecostal Fellowship of North America in 1948 in Des Moines, Iowa, in an alliance with the Assemblies of God, the Church of God, the Open Bible Standard Churches, the Pentecostal Holiness Church, and others. In 1994, 46 years after the founding of the Pentecostal Fellowship, it was reorganized as the Pentecostal/Charismatic Churches of North America after combining with African-American organizations, most significantly the Church of God in Christ.

In 1968, the Calvary Chapel Costa Mesa congregation of the International Church of the Foursquare Gospel (under pastor Chuck Smith) broke from the denomination and later formed an association of autonomous Charismatic Evangelical churches, today making up the Charismatic but non-Pentecostal denomination, Calvary Chapel.

Wayman Mitchell was formerly a pastor of the Foursquare church in Prescott, Arizona. During his time as a pastor at Foursquare, Mitchell planted multiple churches who called themselves The Door. The practices of this group of churches began to differ from other churches within Foursquare, such as the rejection of formal Bible college education for pastors. In 1983, after complaints from other Foursquare pastors about the methods, attitudes, and tactics used by Mitchell's churches, Mitchell split from Foursquare and took his churches with him. Mitchell's churches would later become known the Potter's House Christian Fellowship.

On May 31, 1988, John R. Holland became the Church's third president and held the position until July 1997.

Harold Helms served as interim president from July 1997 to July 1998 and was followed by Paul C. Risser, who became the president on April 16, 1998, at the church's 75th annual convention.

In October 2003, under Risser's tenure, the church sold the Los Angeles radio station KFSG-FM to the Spanish Broadcasting System for $250 million. Risser's leadership led to another high-profile controversy for the church, when, without the involvement of the denomination's board of directors and finance council, church funds were invested in firms that targeted the "close-knit evangelical community" but turned out to be Ponzi schemes. Risser resigned his leadership position under fire in March 2004. Jared Roth became interim president for a few months.

Jack W. Hayford, the founder of The Church On The Way in Van Nuys, California, served as the president of the Foursquare Church from 2004 to 2009. Hayford, along with Pastors Roy Hicks Jr. in Eugene, Oregon, Jerry Cook in Gresham, Oregon, Ronald D. Mehl of the Beaverton Foursquare Church in Beaverton, Oregon, and John Holland in Vancouver, British Columbia, have been credited by the church with setting a plan for the denomination's continued survival despite its staggering financial losses estimated at $15 million under the failed leadership of Paul Risser.

Glenn Burris, Jr. served as president from 2009 to 2020. In 2020, Randy Remington became the 10th president of The Foursquare Church.

== Statistics ==
According to a census published by the association in 2022, it had 67,500 churches, with 8.8 million members in 150 countries.

According to the 2010 US Religion Census, there are over 320,000 members in the United States and 1,823 churches.

== Beliefs ==
The beliefs of the Foursquare Church are expressed in its Declaration of Faith, compiled by its founder, Aimee Semple McPherson. McPherson also authored a shorter, more concise creedal statement.

The church believes in the verbal inspiration of the Bible, the doctrine of the Trinity, and the deity of Jesus Christ. It believes that human beings were created in the image of God but, because of the Fall, are naturally depraved and sinful. The church believes in the substitutionary atonement, accomplished by the death of Christ, and teaches that salvation is by grace through faith, not by good works. Believers are justified by faith and born again upon repentance and acceptance of Christ as Lord and king. Consistent with its belief in human free will, the Foursquare Church also teaches that it is possible for a believer to backslide or commit apostasy.

The Foursquare Church, a Finished Work Pentecostal denomination, teaches that sanctification is a continual process of spiritual growth. Spiritual growth is believed to be promoted by Bible study and prayer. The Foursquare Church believes in the baptism with the Holy Spirit as an event separate from conversion that empowers the individual and the wider church to fulfill the church's mission of evangelization. The Foursquare Church believes Holy Spirit baptism is received in the same manner as recorded in the Book of Acts: the believer can expect to speak in tongues. The church believes that spiritual gifts continue in operation for the edification of the church.

The Foursquare Church believes that divine healing is a part of Christ's atonement and teaches that the sick can be healed in response to prayer. The Foursquare Church anticipates a premillennial return of Christ to earth. It believes that there will be a future final judgment where the righteous will receive everlasting life and the wicked everlasting punishment. The Foursquare Church observes believer's baptism by immersion and the Lord's Supper, or Holy Communion, as ordinances. Open communion is practiced. Anointing of the sick and tithing are practiced as well.

== Structure ==
The denomination's church government has an "episcopal character" that dates back to its founder. McPherson had veto power over church decisions, appointed all officers, and hired all employees.

The Foursquare Convention is the chief decision-making body of the Foursquare Church. Meeting regularly every year, the convention's voting membership includes international officers and licensed ministers. Each Foursquare church located in the United States has the right to send one voting delegate per every 50 church members. National Foursquare Churches outside of the United States may send one official delegate to the convention.

A board of 12 to 24 directors manages the Foursquare Church. In addition to overseeing the Church's activities, the board of directors appoints officers and is responsible for licensing and ordaining ministers. Members of the board include the president, vice presidents, and at least nine ministers representing geographic regions. Church members in good standing may also be appointed to the board.

Local Foursquare churches are subordinate parts of the International Church of the Foursquare Gospel and are operated according to the bylaws of the international church. There are two categories of Foursquare churches. A "charter member church" is a member church that has no legal existence apart from the international church and whose property is owned by the international church. The second category is "covenant member church", which include "pioneer churches" and previously non-member churches. Pioneer churches are recently established church plants that have not been upgraded to charter member status. Covenant member churches might also be previously non-member churches that join the Foursquare Church but choose not to transfer their real property to the international church. Non-member churches may choose to affiliate with the International Church of the Foursquare Gospel without becoming a full member of the international church. These "community member churches" retain their separate legal identities and autonomy.

== North America ==
Three colleges are affiliated with the Foursquare Church: Life Pacific University, formerly "L. I. F. E. Bible College," in San Dimas, California, Life Pacific College Virginia in Christiansburg, Virginia, and Pacific Life Bible College in Surrey, British Columbia.

In 2006, membership in the United States was 353,995 in 1,875 churches. In 2023, the number of churches in the U.S. was reported at 2,021. While congregations are concentrated along the West Coast, the denomination is well distributed across the United States. The states with the highest membership rates are Oregon, Hawaii, Montana, Washington, and California.

== South America ==
=== Ecuador ===
The Foursquare Church arrived in Ecuador in 1956 with the arrival of a couple by the name of Gadberry. Acting as missionaries under the auspices of the Los Angeles congregation, they began by founding churches in Guayaquil. They remained in Ecuador until 1960, but returned a year later to found the first Foursquare church in Quito. As of 2012, there were 200 Foursquare churches in Ecuador, with 32 in Guayaquil alone.

== Controversies ==
=== Failed investments ===
In 2004, the denomination's president and treasurer resigned after losing $14 million of the denomination for approving two financial investment projects that were in fact a scam.

In 2013, under Glenn Burris Jr.'s leadership, the church lost $2 million in a failed investment of a Broadway play based on the life of Aimee Semple McPherson.

=== Sexual abuse allegations ===
Over the years Foursquare church has been accused of sexual abuse numerous times which has resulted in many lawsuits against the church.

In the 1990s in Beaverton, Oregon, Matt Davis, a teenager alleged he was sexually molested at a Foursquare Church by Raymond Martin Johnson, a former doctor and Foursquare member. Previously in 1971 Johnson had served 6 years probation for having sex with an underage boy. Despite the church being aware of Johnson's prior charges he was still allowed by the church to work as a volunteer and host Foursquare youth events at his home. In 2012, Davis sued the church for $1 million in damages for mental, emotion and psychical distress. The suit was later settled out of court.

In 2007, two men and a woman filed a lawsuit against Foursquare pastor Darrell Roberts and his 2 sons alleging that Robert's sons had sexually abused them when they were children. The suit sought $8.4 million in damages against foursquare alleging that Roberts and his superiors failed to supervise his sons contact with children, report the crimes or express any concern to church members. However, the suit was dismissed. In 2017, Mary Ellen Wright alleged in a lawsuit that in 2000 youth minister Charles Price had repeatedly sexually abused her including inappropriate touching her and forcing her to perform oral sex.

In March 2019, Godly Response to Abuse in the Christian Environment, a Christian organization that combats sexual abuse received a complaint directed against executive pastor Mike Larkin. Heidi Cooper, a pastor and member of foursquare church alleged in the complaint that he had repeatedly sent her sexually explicit on Facebook Messenger over the course of 3 years. Another woman accused Larkin of gazing at women's breasts and discussing sex and masturbation. In December 2019, Larkin resigned and was given $99,000 severance pay. In 2022, Barry Buzza, a former President of the Foursquare Church in Canada, was sued for sexual abuse by a former Foursquare member. The former member also alleged that Buzza subjected her to "psychological, spiritual, and sexual grooming, abuse and exploitation".

== See also ==
- Church of the Foursquare Gospel in the Philippines
- List of the largest Protestant bodies
- World Evangelical Alliance
- Believers' Church
