= W. F. P. Burton =

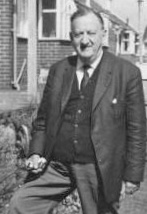

William Frederick Padwick Burton (1886–1971), also known as Brother Willie Burton, was a British Pentecostal missionary, artist, and pioneer of missions in the Congo.

== Career ==
Born in Liverpool in 1886, Burton left for Africa in 1915. Known for his innovative approach to indigenizing the church and engaging with local cultures, Burton co-founded the Congo Evangelistic Mission (CEM) in 1915 with fellow missionary James Salter. This organization was pivotal in establishing Pentecostal Christianity in what is now the Democratic Republic of Congo.

Burton's work emphasized collaboration with local communities and leaders, as he believed in training and empowering indigenous pastors to lead their churches. He was a skilled communicator and chronicler, documenting his experiences through books and sketches. Notable works include Congo Sketches and God Working With Them, which provide insights into his life and ministry. He also faced challenges, such as navigating the complexities of Belgian colonial policies and the cultural tensions inherent in missionary work.

Throughout his life, Burton maintained a dual identity as a religious leader and an artist. His illustrations and writings have become valuable resources for understanding early Pentecostal missions and the dynamics of cross-cultural evangelism.
