= Erika Sutter =

Erika Sutter

Erika Sutter (1917–2015) was a Swiss ophthalmologist and a medical missionary in South Africa. She became a lecturer at the International Centre for Eye Health (ICEH) and at the Swiss Tropical Institute. Motivated by her faith, she joined the Swiss Mission in South Africa and worked at the Elim Hospital. She made significant advances against malnutrition and trachoma. She practiced community mobilization and preventive healthcare through establishing a Care Group system. She wrote academic papers and books about her work. She was awarded an honorary doctorate degree by the University of Basel, and the 1984 Woman of the Year.

== Early life ==
Erika Sutter was born in Basel, Switzerland on June 14, 1917 to Ernst Theodor Sutter and Meta (née Ris). She had a sister Trudi. Her family had a second home in Troistorrents. She was homeschooled until third grade. From fourth grade, she enrolled in Basel girls' high school Gymnasium am Kohlenberg. In 1937, Sutter enrolled in University of Basel and majored in botany and zoology along with minors in geography and physics. She continued studying after her undergraduate years and completed a doctorate in plant physiology in 1952. She worked at the Institute of Botany during her student years.

After considering a teaching career, she worked at Swiss pharmaceutical firm Hoffmann-La Roche in the animal physiology department. In 1948, she worked in the botany department at the Swedish University of Agricultural Sciences in Ultana, where she stayed for two years.

== Missionary career ==
Sutter first heard about the Swiss Mission in South Africa from her friend Marie-Louise Martin, who was then working as a high school chaplain in Basel. She contacted the missionaries there to find out about the mission's work. Her plans were halted after the sudden deaths of her father and sister in 1945. Her interest in working for the Swiss Mission was reignited during her time in Sweden. Her encounters with missionaries there compelled her to pursue missionary work, and she left for South Africa in mid-April 1952.

=== Motivations ===
Although raised a devout Christian, Dr. Sutter did not see her commitment to missionary service as a religious calling, nor a means to fulfill her personal ambition. She explains in her biography that it was “simply her path”.

=== Achievements ===
From 1952 to 1984, Sutter worked at the Elim Hospital as a member of the staff and as an ophthalmologist for around twenty years. During that time, she was responsible for eye services and training of ophthalmic nurses in the hospital. She worked mostly in the Northern Transvaal regions and was involved extensively in preventive health care in the community through the Care Groups. To train to be an ophthalmologist, she returned to Switzerland to study ophthalmology and practice surgical procedures in the Basel Eye Hospital. She returned to the Elim Hospital in 1965 as a certified ophthalmologist. As the only doctor in the eye department, she treated trachoma and various other eye diseases. However, as the eye hospital expanded and more doctors assisted in eye treatments, Sutter was able to direct her focus on achieving other visions.

Sutter had wanted to start a nursing school for eye care since she started working in South Africa, and in 1975, her dream was fulfilled when the South African Nursing Council officially recognized their new curriculum and approved the school. At the school, African nurses could be trained and receive an official diploma in ophthalmic nursing. That same year, she also established the Rivoni Society for the Blind, a rehabilitation center that offered workshops and training for the visually impaired and the blind. The society also offered a school for blind children where they could read Braille and learn how to use a typewriter.

=== Care Groups ===
In an effort to reduce cases of trachoma, an eye disease that is easily curable with the application of good hygienic practices, Sutter helped organize Care Groups with Selina Maphorogo, her translator and main motivator of the Care Groups. Care Groups aimed to mobilize local people, mostly women, to spread awareness to local communities about trachoma and how to prevent it. As a result of their efforts, the number of active trachoma cases was reduced by 50% within three years. Care Groups have helped spread awareness and address a wide range of problems such as HIV/AIDS and malnutrition in the region. The project quickly multiplied; by 2002, 10,000 women were working in 300 villages.

== Works ==
One of Sutter’s most significant publications is Hanyane, a Village Struggles for Eye Health, an educational book that has been translated into many languages. The book goes into detail about effective preventive care and village development, and documents useful medical notes for ophthalmologists.

Her work The Community is my University is a compilation of interviews with her and Selina Maphorogo. This book mainly focused on Care Groups and development aid.

== Recognition ==
- Woman of the Year in 1984.
- Honorary doctorate degree from the University of Basel for her work and accomplishments in South Africa in 1995.
- Trachoma Gold Medal awarded by the French Ligue Internationale Contre le Trachome (1996).
- Ophthalmological Society of South Africa (2005). Mamphela Ramphele, a South African politician and an activist against apartheid, praised Erika as a “fellow global citizen, [who] not only opened the physical eyes of those she encountered but also their spiritual eyes, to appreciate the power they had within them.”

== Retirement ==
Sutter retired in 1984 at 67 and returned to Basel, Switzerland. In her retirement, she spent most of her time traveling and giving presentations and teaching at the Swiss Tropical Institute in Basel and at the International Centre for Eye Health in England. Dr. Erika Sutter died in 2015 at age 98.
