= Potter's House Christian Fellowship =

Global church network founded in the USA

- Christian Fellowship Ministries
- The Door, Victory Chapel
- Potter's House Christian Fellowship
- 34°37′50.48″N 112°25′38.33″W
- Location: Prescott, Arizona
- Country: United States
- Denomination: Non-denominational, Pentecostal
- Previous denomination: Foursquare Gospel Church
- Website: The Potter's House

History
- Founded: 1970
- Founder: Wayman O. Mitchell

The Potter's House Christian Fellowship, commonly known as The Potter's House, is a Pentecostal Christian organisation based in the United States of America. It was established in Prescott, Arizona, in 1970 by Wayman Mitchell. The Potter's House was a member of the Foursquare church until 1983 when they separated to form a new independent fellowship.

The church has also been criticised in a number of areas including high levels of control, extreme commitment requirements, and the mistreatment of former members. It has been labelled by many ex-members as a cult.

== Etymology ==
The fellowship name the "Potter's House" derives from the biblical text Jeremiah 18:2:

Arise, and go down to the potter's house, and there I will cause thee to hear my words.

— Jeremiah 18:2 (King James Version)

== Beliefs ==
The Potter's House Statement of Faith contains the central beliefs of the church. The articles of faith are summarised as below:

- There is one true God, and he exists as a Trinity: Father, Son, and Holy Spirit.
- God the Father created the universe and mankind. After man's fall he invited mankind back for reconciliation through Christ.
- Jesus Christ is eternally God. He was incarnated by the Holy Spirit of the Virgin Mary.
- The Holy Spirit is eternally God, given in completion to the Church at Pentecost and works to empower, guide and align Christians to Christ.
- Baptism in the Holy Spirit, after conversion, is evidenced with the fruits and gifts of the Holy Spirit and speaking in tongues.
- The Bible is the infallible, eternal and final Word of God with ultimate authority. It contains the fullness of what is required to live a Christian life.
- Christ's death on the cross made full atonement for the world's sins. Atonement also provides healing of body, soul, and spirit.
- Salvation is given through the death of Christ and is received through faith toward Christ and repentance toward God.
- Christians are to live a life separated and dedicated to God. "The shortcomings of the individual are because of the still progressing sanctification of the saints".
- The Church is the Body of Christ consisting of those who are born of the Spirit. The work of the church is to fulfil the Great Commission.
- Water baptism, done in the name of the Father, Son and Holy Spirit, is a sign of the believer identifying with the death, burial and resurrection of Christ.
- The Lord's Supper is done to commemorate the death of Jesus and is a sign of "participation in Him".
- The second coming of Christ, millennium and final judgement.
- The final judgement will be the final determination of the eternal state for all mankind "determined by their relationship to Jesus Christ".

== History ==
=== Beginnings: 1969–1989 ===
In 1969, Wayman Mitchell asked for a ministerial position and was appointed to serve as the minister of the Foursquare church in Prescott, Arizona. Mitchell promoted personal witnessing which saw much church growth, primarily from the youth of the hippie movement and resulted in an overflowing church by the early seventies. Mitchell began to establish new churches which were originally called The Door (and later, these churches were called the Potter's House), first within Arizona and interstate, then overseas. Mitchell discouraged his disciples from attending bible schools due to his own negative experiences in them so the men who he sent out did not receive full ordinations from Foursquare. According to Nathaniel Van Cleave, Mitchell permitted only his own style of primitive and militant evangelism, isolated his disciples from other Foursquare ministers and as a group, they walked out of conference meetings that they disagreed with. Although Mitchell was the state superintendent, he only focused on his own churches, excluding all other Foursquare churches that were under his care. Over time, this caused resentment among the excluded congregations and at least one church left the denomination as a result.

At the 1983 Foursquare convention, a large number of pastors brought complaints against Mitchell to the executive council meeting. Mitchell made no attempt to respond to the complaints. Instead, he and his followers left the conference. A special meeting was later held with Mitchell in an attempt to establish understanding and continued fellowship but this attempt was unsuccessful. Within weeks, Mitchell and the churches which he had planted severed their ties with Foursquare and became an independent fellowship.

=== Since 1990 ===
In 1990, approximately 100 churches split from the Potter's House. Larry Neville stated that the split was partially due to restrictions which prevented them from maturing and enlarging their expressions of faith.

In August 2000, a second split occurred, with around 160 churches leaving the fellowship. Harold Warner stated that the pastors who had left were just going in a different direction. Brian Hupperts stated that pastors left because of unhealthy control. Charisma Magazine reported that some of the pastors that had left were apparently upset with the direction the fellowship was heading in.

Wayman Mitchell died on September 21, 2020, in Prescott, Arizona.

== Statistics ==
As of November 2026, Christian Fellowship Ministries has over 4200 churches worldwide.

== Conferences ==
Annual week-long conferences are a feature of national leadership churches throughout the fellowship with 55 recorded conference centres as of 2022.

== Doctrine and practice ==
The Potter's House Christian Fellowship holds Pentecostal beliefs with a strong emphasis on evangelism, church planting, and discipleship. Doctrines include salvation by faith, the infallibility of the bible, faith healing, and the second coming of Jesus Christ.

A program of evangelism is promoted with regular outreach events scheduled including, but not limited to, street evangelism, music concerts, movie nights, and revival meetings, with the intention of converting people and increasing church membership.

A major goal of the church is the establishment of new churches, commonly referred to as church planting. This is achieved through the in-house training of pastors who are then sent to start a new church. Local congregations, both new and established, have no say over who leads the church. Pastors in the Potter's House do not receive any formal theological training as this is considered a waste of time and bible college is believed to cause those wanting to become pastors to lose their passion for the church. Instead, the church uses a process called discipleship, a type of on-the-job training where men wanting to become ministers are mentored by their pastor for three years before starting their own church. These new pastors then go on to repeat the process by training their own disciples to start new churches. Women in the church are not encouraged to pursue careers as the church believes their place is in the home supporting their husbands.

Faith healing is another belief held by the church, which holds faith healing meetings and invites the public to attend. According to Kenneth Whelan, people can be healed if they forgive all sins committed against them and become Christians. Meetings generally consist of singing, a request for donations, a sermon, and an altar call, which is a request for people to come to the front and repent. After this, people are called to the front to be prayed for healing.

The church believes that participating in sin can result in physical problems; it holds that homosexuality can cause deafness, and idol worship can cause problems with eyesight. Breast cancer is linked to hatred of husbands, unforgiveness and gossip, and cervical cancer is linked to the "curse of promiscuity".

Financial support for the church comes from the collection of tithes from its members (donating 10% of a member's gross income) and each church in turn also pays a tithe. Financial offerings over and above the tithe are also encouraged. According to an investigation by Chris Hayes, the church financial structure is set up in a pyramid structure, with each church sending 5% of its offering back to its Mother church and another 5% back to the head church in Prescott.

== Criticism and controversy ==
The Potter's House has received much criticism throughout its existence and has been labelled by many as a cult. Major areas of criticism include the level of control exerted over its members, the intense level of commitment required, and the shunning and mistreatment of those who have left the church.

=== Controlling behaviour ===
Lee Stubbs, a former fellowship pastor, stated that the church uses a subtle form of conditioning. "It's not some maniacal thing of someone demanding blood, but the leaders have a very persuasive power over people. There was a system of things in place that directed our lives." While new members are given love and attention to make them want to stay in the church, many former pastors and members have stated that church techniques are designed to keep those in the congregation submissive, employing fear tactics, public ridicule, and shunning to ensure compliance. Members are told not to question the pastor's leadership and those who do so are considered rebellious. According to Stubbs, loyalty to the pastor is equated to loyalty to God. While the church has stated numerous times publicly that people are free to leave if they choose, former members have stated that pastors create a fear that if they do leave, they will be out of the will of God, their lives will fall apart, and they will go to hell. In one case, the parents of a former member were killed in a car accident shortly after she left the church. The church blamed the deaths on the ex-member for leaving.

=== Level of commitment ===
The church requires an intense level of commitment from its members and uses psychological and emotional pressure to enforce that commitment. Stubbs stated that commitment to the church is constantly reinforced with phrases such as, "Every time the doors are open, you need to be here. You need to stay on fire for God. You need to be involved. You need to be committed. You need to be loyal." Members will spend up to seven nights a week at church in their commitment to the fellowship and have reported getting in trouble for leaving services early.

=== Shunning and mistreatment ===
According to numerous former pastors and members, anyone leaving the church is considered to be a rebel and a "backslider". Members still in the church are instructed to cut off all ties with the former member, who is often condemned from the pulpit. This form of shunning can include not just the shunning of friends but the turning of family members against each other. In cases where interaction does occur, former members have reported receiving harassing letters and phone calls, and being slandered through rumours. In one case, church leaders were instructed to publicly renounce a pastor who had left the group.

Former members have consistently reported that time in the church has led to traumatic experiences both to individuals and to families. A therapist described the symptoms of one couple who had left the church as similar to those who suffer from post-traumatic stress disorder. A court prevented a man from taking his 5-year-old daughter to the church after she was diagnosed with PTSD as a result of being traumatised by a pastor of the church. The pastor had dressed up like the devil and placed the girl's hands into a bucket of fake blood with a cow's heart in it and yelled at her that she would never get her hand out. The pastor did not deny the event and stated that it was good to have some fear in one's life. Others stated the church had robbed them of self esteem and independence, and left them feeling spiritually shattered, while others said their involvement with the church led to divorce.

=== Lack of pastoral training ===
Former pastors of the church have noted that not only do pastors have little experience when they are sent out, because the church does not send men out to be formally educated in religious studies and the Bible, they are poorly equipped to understand it as a result, leading to indoctrination based in the Potter's House methodology, rather than education stemming from formal training.

=== Cult ===
The intensity of involvement and indoctrination by the church has led to many former members labelling the group a cult. The church has been accused of brainwashing its members resulting in the blind following of church beliefs and the division of families. Any doubts or questioning of the church is attributed to lying spirits and the voice of the devil, and is considered akin to doubting God. Rick Ross, a cult expert with extensive experience dealing with former Potter's House members, stated that while he does not consider the church to be a cult, it is a destructive group very close to being a cult.

=== Rape ===
In 1984, church member Debbie Christensen told her pastor, Paul Campo, that she had been raped by another church member. Christensen stated that when she told Campo about the rape, he told her she probably deserved it and not to tell anyone else about it. Campo responded in a letter to The Arizona Republic stating that after Christensen told him about the alleged rape, he spoke with the accused rapist who convinced him that the sex was consensual. Christensen's mother also spoke with Campo about the alleged rape, who told her it was Christensen's fault and there was nothing he could do. Church founder Wayman Mitchell contradicted Campo's claim in another letter to The Arizona Republic, stating that Christensen had not told Campo that she had been raped as he would have told her to go to the authorities and press charges. Mitchell stated that Christensen claimed she was raped because she was bitter and vindictive.

=== Homophobia ===
The church holds a homophobic position in relation to the LGBTQI community and has screened anti-gay movies to the public. In a 2009 interview with the Waikato Times, Scott McGrath stated that although it was still considered a sin, the church had softened its stance on homosexuality and would accept gay, lesbian, and transgender members. However, in 2018 founder Wayman Mitchell was recorded using a homophobic slur while preaching in Guam, referring to homosexuals as "little faggots" and claiming that the gay community was miserable. Mitchell's use of derogatory remarks from the pulpit had been previously noted in a report by Charisma magazine.

=== Intellectual property theft ===
In August 2022 a Texan church performed a rewritten version of the stage show Hamilton over two nights without obtaining the rights to do so. Representatives for Hamilton were made aware of the production and issued a cease-and-desist letter for unauthorized use of intellectual property. The Dramatists Guild, who represent playwrights, composers and lyricists, condemned the church for the unauthorized performance. After speaking with Hamilton's lawyers, the church was allowed to proceed with its Saturday evening performance on the condition that it was not live-streamed or recorded, that photos and videos were not posted, and no further productions were performed. However, at the time the Hamilton team was unaware of the changes to the lyrics or the anti-LGBTQ+ sermon presented at the end of the show. A spokesman for Hamilton said they were "in the process of reviewing the unauthorized changes made to the script to determine further action." In late August, Roman Gutierrez, the church's pastor, issued an apology to Hamilton's creator, Lin-Manuel Miranda, promising to destroy all images, video, and sound recordings of their production and agreed to never stage the performance again. The church also agreed to pay damages for their actions. Hamilton representatives stated all damages would be donated to the South Texas Equality Project, a nonprofit coalition supporting the LGBTQ community. The church had previously performed an unauthorized, rewritten performance of Disney's Beauty and the Beast in 2018.

=== Police fatalities ===
On April 22, 2020, in Australia four Victorian police officers were killed when truck driver Mohinder Singh ran off the road and into the officers who had stopped another vehicle. Prior to leaving the depot, Singh had informed his supervisor, Simiona Tuteru, that he was too tired to drive, was "seeing things" and had been cursed by a witch. Rather than sending him home to rest, Singh stated that Tuteru, who was a pastor and missionary for the Potter's House church, searched Singh's car for voodoo dolls, then put his hand on Singh's head and prayed for him to have the curse removed. Tuteru then told Singh he was "right to go" on the delivery and could go home afterwards. The fatalities occurred a short time afterwards. Tuteru was initially charged with four counts of manslaughter, but these were later dropped in favour of heavy vehicle charges. A judge later put the case permanently on hold due to "oppressive" misuse of court processes. David Vicary, former head pastor of the Australian Potter's House churches, said in an interview that although the church had good people in it, it was a bad system that led people to hold extreme positions. He further stated that the church leaders were not accountable to anyone outside of themselves which led to tragedies such as this. In 2023, 60 Minutes Australia investigated the links between the fatalities and the church. Their investigation was aired in April 2023.
