= Hedvig Posse =

Swedish missionary (1861–1927)

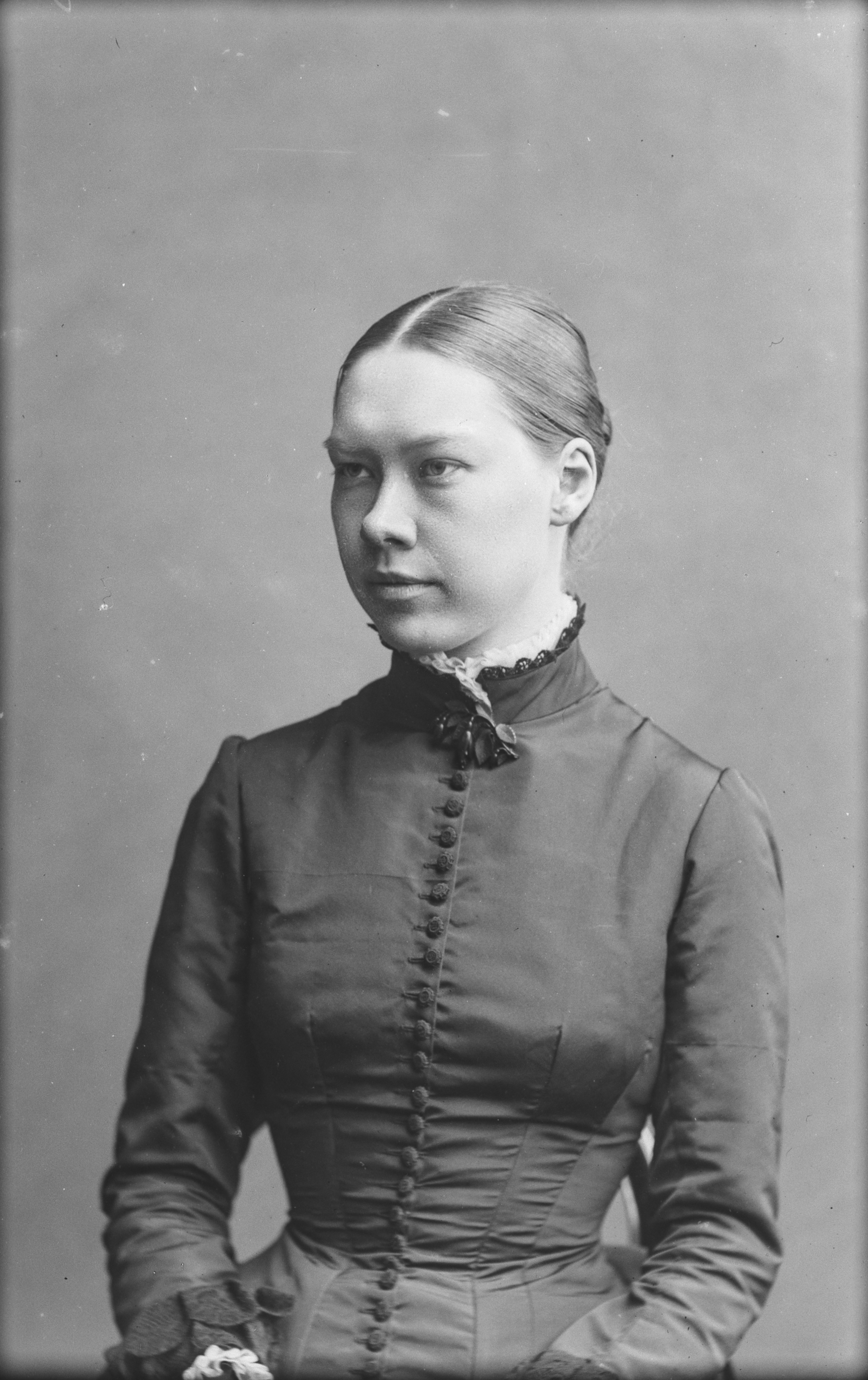
Hedvig Posse, 1887.

Hedvig Posse (8 August 1861 – 22 December 1927) was a Swedish missionary in South Africa, linguist and hymn writer. She was one of the "most prominent translators and recorders of Zulu music and oral history", who translated a number of stories, fairy tales and poetry from Zulu to Swedish. She also translated Swedish hymns into Zulu, with the "aim of replacing traditional songs with Christian texts".

== Biography ==
Born on 8 August 1861 in Stockholm, Sweden, Hedvig Posse was the daughter of the Swedish author Betty Ehrenborg-Posse and her husband Baron Johan August Posse, who was a lawyer and parliamentarian. She did not receive any formal education, but was taught privately by a tutor at her home. In 1887, she applied to Svenska Kyrkans Missions (SKM), expressing her interest to be a missionary in South Africa. Between 1887 and 1897, she worked at Oscarberg's mission station, located at Rorke's Drift, in the northern part of Natal province (now called KwaZulu-Natal). Her assignments included teaching Zulus in schools.

Her good economic standing helped her to take independent decisions in terms of initiating different activities including the building of a health centre, called the Bethany Mission Hospital, at Dundee Coalfields, a coal-mining town in Natal. Her involvement in healthcare was considered a pioneering work of missionaries at that time, and later became part of SKM. She was trained at the Huguenot Seminarium in Wellington, South Africa (now part of Huguenot College), a specialized training institute for female missionaries. She briefly served at the North American mission station of Inanda.

During her service as a missionary, she documented and translated Zulu songs, and engaged in watercolour painting, photography and building houses for the locals.

She was 66 years old when she died in Uppsala on 22 December 1927.
