= William Hughlett =

American physician,

- Born: August 11, 1903; Petersburg, Virginia
- Died: December 17, 1990 (age 87); Florida
- Occupations: American physician, medical missionary, college professor

William (Bill) S. Hughlett (August 11, 1903 – December 17, 1990) was an American physician, medical missionary, and college professor. He is best known for his contributions as a medical missionary to the African continent, specifically Wembo Nyama, Belgian Congo (now Democratic Republic of Congo), where he worked as a generalist doctor from 1929 to 1969. He developed the Methodist Mission Hospital facilities and aided in treating an array of illnesses, including leprosy, cataracts, and venereal diseases. He also worked to bring awareness to the lack of resources and sanitary conditions in the Congo. He also acted as a liaison for communication between the mission in Wembo Nyama and his Florida church community, which coordinated the mission trip.

After retiring in 1969, he moved to Brevard County and became a teacher at Brevard Community College. At his passing in 1990, he was honored by his Methodist Church and the Brevard Community College for his medical and mission service. His three children also went on to complete international missionary work.

== Personal life ==
=== Early life and education ===
William S. Hughlett was born in Petersburg, Virginia in 1903 to father Rev. A. M. Hughlett. His father named him after his brother, William L. Hughlett, who was a renowned doctor and eventual mayor in the city of Cocoa, Florida. From an early age, William S. Hughlett desired to travel and become a missionary. His father did not agree with this, for he hoped for his son to become a physician in the likeness of William L. Hughlett (S. Hughlett's uncle).

Led by his father's urges, Hughlett attended Emory Academy, college, university and Medical School. He then moved to Cocoa, Florida where his uncle worked as a physician. Hughlett worked alongside his uncle serving patients in the Cocoa community and soon took over the practice entirely, when a year later his uncle died unexpectedly of general peritonitis.

=== Family ===
In 1927, Hughlett married Violet Jane Packard and the couple lived together in Cocoa, Florida where he worked as a physician for three years. Hughlett took over his uncle's physician practice in Cocoa. Hughlett and his spouse found a connection with the Christian religion and became involved in a local First Methodist Church. He became a member of the First United Methodist Church of Cocoa in 1924. The couple would live in Cocoa together until their shift to missionary work in Wembo Nyana, Belgian Congo in 1929.

The Hughlett couple had their first child, William Hughlett Jr., shortly after arrival in the Congo. Hughlett Jr. died in an accident during infancy as the family was waiting to take a boat on the Congo river. Despite this loss, the couple continued on with their mission journey.

During their later time in the Congo, William Hughlett and wife Violet Hughlett had three children, John Packard Hughlett, Vera Hughlett, and Dorothy Ann Hughlett. Hughlett's children grew up in both Wembo Nyama and in Cocoa, Florida, which they returned to during Hughlett's periods of furlough. When their parents were at work in the Congo, the children were often tended to by Congolese natives, whom Hughlett found to be thorough caretakers.

== Missionary work ==
=== Journey to the Congo ===
The Methodist missionary presence in the Congo was robust and still growing in 1929. Various Methodist churches, including the one Dr. Hughlett belonged to, began an effort to increase missionary numbers in the Congo. Their objectives were to spread Christianity to the Congolese people while also tending to the Congo's epidemic of leprosy and sleeping sickness, and the children orphaned by it. Dr. and Mrs. Hughlett answered a call for missionaries from their local church and left for the Congo in 1929. They were led by a strong love of God and conviction to follow God's calling. The mission trip was intended to last five years until 1934, but the couple remained in the Congo for 40 years until 1969.

=== Physician work ===
Upon arrival in the Congo, Hughlett was assigned to his mission's hospital compound and became the lead physician there, where he served up to 70-80 patients each day. He took over Janet Miller's lead role as physician. Miller thought it to be too dangerous to work in the Congo as a woman. Hughlett took up the task of rebuilding old sections of the hospital and adding new patient quarters, but struggled to find workers and materials. He solved this issue by asking the patients with non life-threatening illnesses and their families to build their own huts on the hospital property. Hughlett would then in turn serve those who had built their own. With this method, Hughlett added more than 20 huts to the hospital.

Hughlett was a medical generalist, performing a variety of surgeries and aiding in treating leprosy, which was spreading quickly in the Congo. He battled a lack of supplies when performing these surgeries and would often be left with no choice but to wash and reuse bandages when his supplies ran low. He sent letters back to the First Methodist Church in Florida in hopes of receiving assistance and asked church members for donations to purchase supplies. The church provided him with supply shipments, and a donated car to expedite his work during his periods of furlough in which he returned to Florida.

While Hughlett mainly worked on his own mission compound, he was often called out to perform urgent state medical duties by the Belgian government, along with lead physicians of other Congolese districts. Hughlett and fellow physicians Charles Shelley and William Lewis were called by the Belgian government to other areas of the Congo to perform general surgeries. They were also asked by the government to lead annual vaccination efforts against sleeping sickness, smallpox, and typhoid fever. Dr. Hughlett additionally made efforts to teach natives to become assistants in his hospital by teaching them to dispense medicine.

=== Returns to Florida ===
Hughlett returned periodically to Cocoa, Florida, usually for year long periods, to give reports on the state of his medical practice in the Congo. He was a main liaison between the happenings in the Wembo Nyama Methodist Mission Hospital and his Florida community. Hughlett led sessions with the Florida Chain of Missions, which were church sponsored events in which lead missionaries of the Florida community would speak on their recent efforts in their respective international communities. In his talks, Hughlett sighted the lack of resources needed to care for all 12,000 people in the Congo district he was assigned. He also alerted his Methodist Church community to the illnesses that were rapidly taking lives of both children and adults in the Congo, including hookworm, cataracts, and leprosy, and continued encouraging them to donate to fund future supply shipments.

=== Troubles with Congolese rebels ===
In August, 1964, Hughlett and his family were captured by Congolese, freedom-seeking rebels and put under house arrest, along with other missionaries. War tensions were rising in the Congo at the time, which led many missionaries to return home. The Hughlett family was released in October of that year when the Congolese army reoccupied Wembo Nyama. The family left the Congo five years later.

== Final years ==
=== Community work ===
Hughlett returned to Cocoa, Florida permanently in 1969 after 40 years of missionary work. By this time, he was aging and losing his eyesight. He worked the final 19 years of life as a professor at the Brevard Community College and was an active member of his First United Methodist Church. He also taught in local prison, hospital, and lay ministries.

=== Legacy ===
William S. Hughlett died on December 17, 1990, in Cocoa, Florida at age 87. His role as lead doctor and liaison between Wembo Nyama and Cocoa, Florida was taken over by Tom Kenaston. Hughlett and Kenaston were both honored at the opening of the Brevard Community College's new Allied Health Center on the Cocoa campus. A stained glass window was made in Hughlett's honor in his First Methodist Church, and shows him giving a child medicine. The church's fellowship hall is also named after him. In 1991, Frank Childers wrote a biography, Uncle Doctor: William S. Hughlett, M.D. missionary to the Congo 1929 - 1969, on the late missionary's life.

Hughlett's children also continued on to complete missionary work. Modeling after his father's work, son John Packard Hughlett joined his parents in the Congo and used his engineering degree to build waterways and complete other construction projects. He remained in the Congo with his family until 1967. Daughter Vera Hughlett worked as a nurse and missionary in West Pakistan.
