= Mary Coombs Greenleaf =

American missionary (1800–1857)

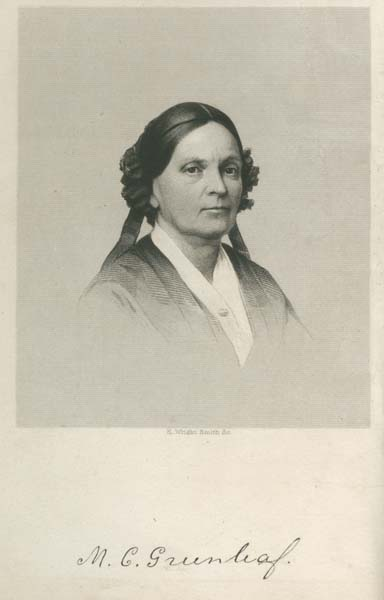
Mary Coombs Greenleaf

Mary Coombs Greenleaf (January 31, 1800 – June 26, 1857) was an American missionary who worked among the Chickasaw Indians.

== Biography ==
Born on January 31, 1800, in Newburyport, Massachusetts, United States, Mary Coombs Greenleaf was the daughter of Ebenezer Greenleaf and Jane Coombs. On May 12, 1800, she was baptised in the Presbyterian Church. She didn't attend any formal school but gained knowledge from studying Bible and reading the writings of Watts and Doddridge.

In 1836, she moved to Andover, Massachusetts, where she worked among local communities for many years. Besides caring for her mother who suffered total blindness, Greenleaf taught in a primary school. She also extensively engaged herself in church related works including teaching at the Sunday school classes.

Early in the 1850s, she wrote the Memoirs of Mary Greenleaf, which was dedicated to her mother.

After her mother's death in 1855, she wrote to the Presbyterian Mission Board, New York, expressing her interest for a teaching work in a foreign mission particularly among Native Americans. Later she was selected to work at the Wapanucka Academy.

In 1856, she joined the Wapanucka Academy, where in early 1857, an epidemic of dysentery broke out. While nursing several Native American girls who had dysentery, Greenleaf herself was stricken with the disease.

She died on June 26, 1857, in Wapanucka, Oklahoma, United States, of "dysentery".
