= Life Pacific University =

Private Christian university in California, United States

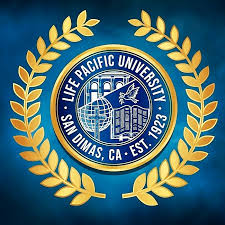
- Centennial Seal 1923-2023
- Former names: Echo Park Evangelistic and Missionary Training Institute (1923–1926); LIFE Bible College (1926–2000s); Life Pacific College (2000s–2019)
- Motto: Christ Centered - Spirit Filled
- Type: Private university
- Established: 1923
- Religious affiliation: International Church of the Foursquare Gospel
- President: Angie Richey
- Provost: Daniel Ruarte
- Students: 780
- Location: San Dimas, California, U.S. 34.0993°N 117.8290°W
- Colors: Navy Blue & Gold
- Nickname: Warriors
- Sporting affiliations: NAIA – GSAC
- Website: lifepacific.edu

Life Pacific University (LPU) is a private Christian university endorsed by the International Church of the Foursquare Gospel and located in San Dimas, California. LPU serves as the denomination's flagship institution for higher education. It is accredited by the Western Association of Schools and Colleges - Senior College and University Commission (WSCUC) and the Association for Biblical Higher Education (ABHE).

== History ==
Life Pacific University was founded in 1923 as Echo Park Evangelistic and Missionary Training Institute by Aimee Semple McPherson in Echo Park, Los Angeles, California. The name was changed to LIFE Bible College (LIFE standing for Lighthouse of International Foursquare Evangelism) in 1926 when it moved into a newly constructed five-story complex next door to Angelus Temple. In 1990 the college relocated to its current home in San Dimas, California. In the early 2000s the name Life Pacific College was adopted and in 2019 the institution was renamed and restructured as Life Pacific University with the College of Arts and Sciences and the College of Theology and Ministry.

In 1957, in Mount Vernon, Ohio, sister college Mount Vernon Bible College was founded, relocating to Christiansburg, Virginia in the 1980s. The name was changed to LIFE Bible College East in 1988. In 2003 LIFE East closed for financial reasons and its records were transferred to Life Pacific. Life Pacific now operates LPU Virginia as an extension campus at the former LIFE Bible College East property.

In 2019, it became Life Pacific University. It was granted an exception to Title IX in 2017 which allows it to legally discriminate against LGBT students for religious reasons.

== Leadership ==
The institution has had eleven presidents serve since its founding in 1923. They are Aimee Semple McPherson, Rolf K. McPherson, Nathaniel M. Van Cleave, Jack W. Hayford, Jack Hamilton, Ron Mehl, Dick Scott, Dan Stewart, Robert Flores, Jim J. Adams, and the current president, Angie Richey.

== Accreditation and affiliations ==
LPU is accredited by the Association for Biblical Higher Education and the WASC Senior College and University Commission. In 2024, the LPU Seminary was granted associate membership in the Association of Theological Schools (ATS). It is an affiliate member of the Council for Christian Colleges and Universities. LPU also holds membership in the National Association of Independent Colleges and Universities (NAICU), the Association of Independent California Colleges and Universities (AICCU), and many other professional higher education associations and societies.

== Alumni ==
Alumni have played a significant role not only within the Foursquare Church but also within the Assemblies of God, Calvary Chapel, and the Vineyard movement. LPU's graduates include pastors Jack Hayford, Chuck Smith, Ronald D. Mehl, Ralph Moore, Ricky Temple, Jim Tolle, Chad Veach, Irene Poupore, Randy Remington, Andraé Crouch, and the late African American actor, pastor and academic Otis Young.

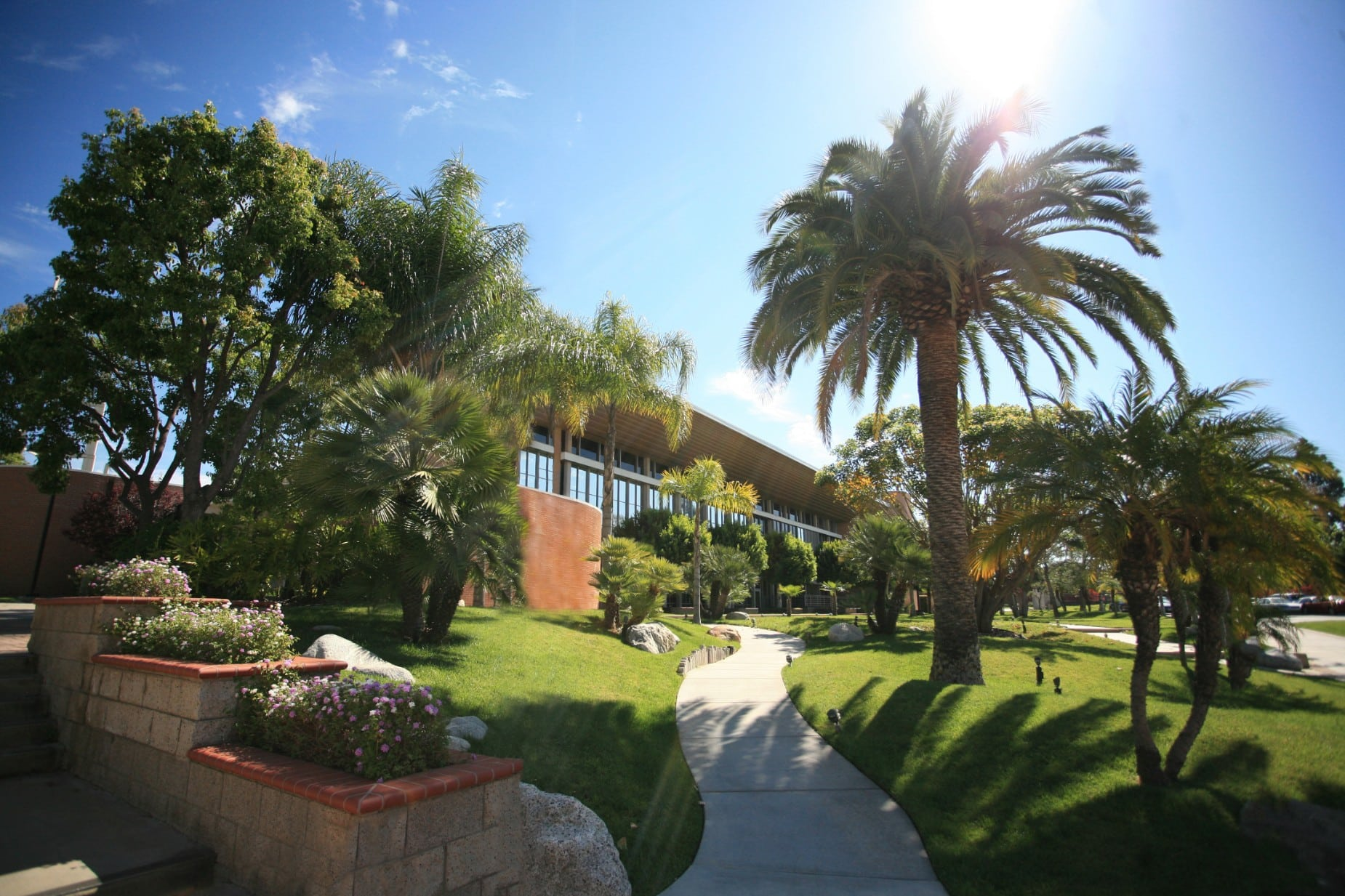
LIFE's Chapel Exterior

== Athletics ==
The Life Pacific athletic teams are called the Warriors. The university is a member of the National Association of Intercollegiate Athletics (NAIA), primarily competing in the Golden State Athletic Conference (GSAC) since the 2017–18 academic year. They were also a member of the National Christian College Athletic Association (NCCAA), primarily competing as an independent in the West Region of the Division I level.

Life Pacific competes in six intercollegiate varsity sports. Men's sports include basketball and soccer; women's sports include basketball, soccer, volleyball, and beach volleyball.
