= Thomas J. Arnold =

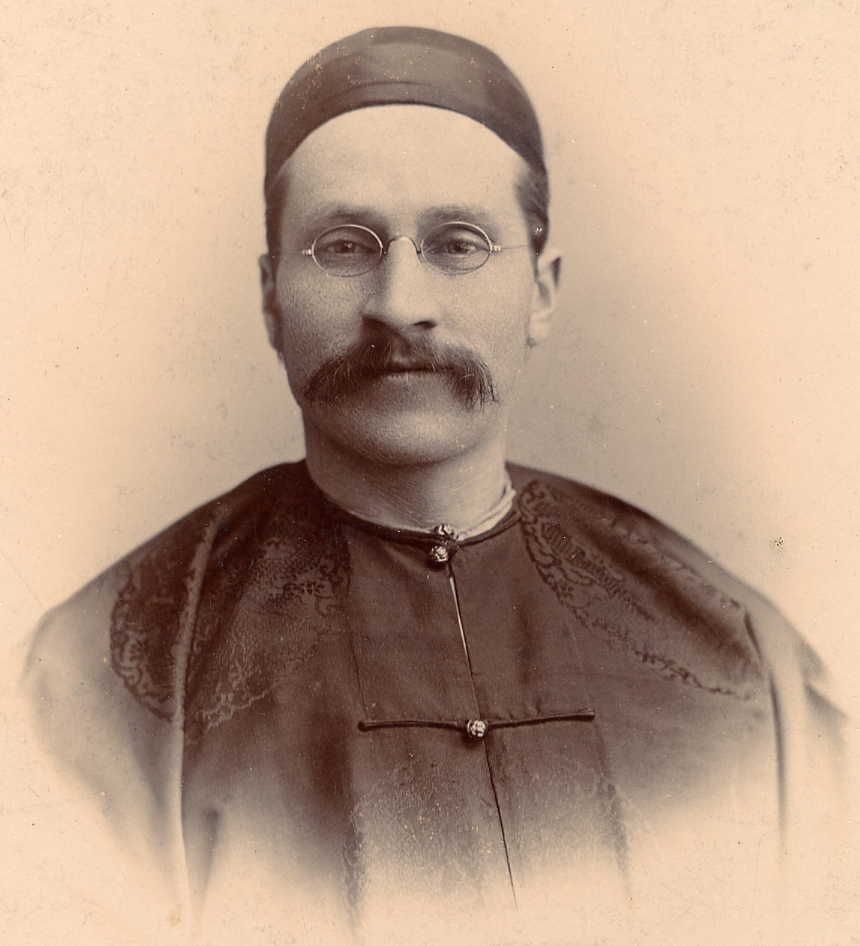
- English Protestant missionary to China
- Born: 18 July 1864; Castle End, Kenilworth, Warwickshire, England
- Died: 20 August 1906 (aged 42); England
- Citizenship: English
- Education: Dr. W. T. Moore’s Missionary Training Class, London, England
- Occupation: Christian missionary
- Organization: China for the Disciples of Christ Church

Thomas J. Arnold (18 July 1864 – 20 August 1906) was an English Protestant missionary to China in the late nineteenth century during the Qing Dynasty.

== Decision to go to China ==
As a young man in London he felt beckoned to missionary service after experiencing an enlightening sermon at the West London Tabernacle Church.

Soon after discussing this call with his pastor he sailed for the China frontier with his colleague, William Remfry Hunt, in September 1889. The two young men had built up a close friendship when they studied diligently together at W. L. Moore Bible Institute.

== Preparation ==
Arnold recognized the first major task in sharing the Christian faith with the Chinese was scaling the language barrier. He began this task in the city of Nanjing. Here he immersed himself in the Chinese language and culture for two years. During this education process there must have been times when he questioned leaving London and a hopeful career as an architect. Yet, in the developing missionary colony his architectural skills were also put to work. He designed and supervised the construction of several missionary houses, schools where thousands of students were educated, and a hospital that saw tens of thousands of patients.

== Early work ==
Along with language study, Arnold also tried to blend in with the natives by using Chinese dress and wearing a queue hairpiece. He traveled thousands of miles on foot and by boat on itineraries where he would preach and sell Bibles and gospel tracts on the road. He also helped to train other missionaries in this method of itinerant evangelism. He worked at many of the large missionary stations and outstations in Nanjing, Luhe, Wuhu, Chuzhou, Wuwei, and Fengyangfu and occasionally encountered hostility and persecution. He also took itinerant trips to Nanjing and the surrounding areas with A. F. H. Saw, E. P. Hearnden, and E. T. Williams. During these trips, he would sell books and preach.

Arnold married Elizabeth Ince (1863-1950), who was also a missionary. Her study, like that of all early missionaries was with a private language teacher, as there was no language school available. Further accentuating the difficulty of learning the language was the inability of most language teachers to speak English.

During March 1892, Arnold worked in the village of Lieu Chang Hiew, which had not seen a foreign missionary in over ten years. He also worked with the town of Ta Tsung Chao. At first, the people in this village were suspicious of him, but soon became more open and friendly. Arnold had a gift for making people feel comfortable. During this year, he also filled in as a doctor. Although he never received any formal training in medicine, he often received hundreds of patients and did what he could to relieve their suffering. This commitment to helping people in a practical sense drew positive attention from some of the upper-class Chinese as well. After filling in temporarily at the hospital, Arnold continued to preach in the villages of Luh Hoh, Sing Tszi, and Kei Keao Ying where he also opened the first boys' school. He often took these trips with his friend and colleague Dr. Butchart. Dr. Butchart was also the man who gave Mr. Arnold some of his instruction on medicine.

Elizabeth's first station after their marriage was in Luh Hoh. Their first house opened right out into the main street and had a courtyard, several main rooms and guest rooms, and a chapel. In order to dispel mistrust and prejudice against foreigners from the locals, Elizabeth allowed the local women to examine the contents of all her belongings. Thomas and Elizabeth were the first missionaries to move into the village of Luh-Hoh. While Arnold had made several trips there before, Elizabeth was the first Caucasian woman they had seen. Elizabeth, like her husband wore a native garment to blend in. Occasionally the local Chinese referred to her as a "foreign devil"; however she found them to be generally friendly and built more friendships with them. The Arnolds also ministered in Wuhu and Thomas Arnold and worked diligently at attempting to open the village of Lu-chou-fu with his colleague Dr. Butchart. This meant that Elizabeth was alone with their small children; however she remarks that she did not fear because "all the Chinese were her friends."

== Mission hospital ==
The mission hospital construction, which was under the supervision of Thomas J Arnold, was completed in 1893 in Nanjing. It saw over 9,000 patients in less than a year. It was also during this period that Mr. Arnold felt a strong calling towards the people in Wuhu. While in Luh Hoh she attended the Chinese wedding of their landlord and his second wife. This revealed to her a deeper understanding of the plight of the Chinese woman. In 1894, Arnold focused more of his efforts in Wuhu and began plans to open a new church there. The children's day school he ran had also begun to see some healthy growth.

The First Sino-Japanese War occurred in 1895, which many of the missionaries thought would halt all their work. However, Arnold found it to have the opposite effect. He also had several exciting encounters during this period. While on a trip to Lu-chow-fu, he was almost executed as a Japanese spy. He was also given a personal escort from the magistrate to protect him from occasionally unruly crowds.

During 1896 Arnold felt his work was somewhat scattered and he had to waste much of his time traveling on a houseboat. However, he still felt that there were some good results. Arnold and his fellow missionaries were also in the process of opening a chapel in Wu-wei-chow, which was about 200 li, (about 100 km or 63 miles) from the nearest missionary station.

Arnold performed several baptisms during this year, including one with a man who had operated a wine shop. He encouraged him to change his profession as an act of sincerity to his faith. He covered 3,200 li (1,600 km or 1,000 miles) during the 125 days of travel, 1,000 of which were done on foot, the rest by boat. He also worked with the native Muslim population. In the beginning of 1897, he was extremely busy, taking in hundreds of visitors. During this year, he was so busy that he occasionally was unable to eat. The Arnolds also had a scare when their son became very ill, but he recovered during a temporary relocation to Japan. By the middle of 1897, the Arnolds went on their first furlough, which lasted eighteen months through 1898. On their return at the end of December 1898, they resumed their work in Chu-chow.

== Boxer Rebellion ==
The Arnolds were initially in Guling with their small children during the Boxer Uprising during 1900. After only being there a short while, they received a message that everyone had been ordered to Shanghai. They arrived with almost nothing and had much difficulty renting a room. The Arnolds finally acquired one, but it was completely without furniture. They tried to rent some beds, however they were infested with bugs. The Arnolds existed in this unsure state for eight months, after which they were able to return to their post.

== Wuhu ==
The Arnolds received a joyful welcome from the Chinese Christians upon their return. Mr. Arnold then spent several months overseeing the boys' school in Nanking, until he was able to return to a more permanent position at Wuhu in 1901. This was excellent for Arnold, who had always had his heart there. However, he remarks that there were new conditions there in the attitude of the people; especially the officials presented him with a peculiar amount of difficulty, but the situation also presented new opportunities. There was also a large increase in the number of natives interested in the church, however, some of these inquiries desired only to reap the benefits of being associated with the Christians. In order to counter this, Mr. Arnold found it necessary to publicly denounce several Chinese people. There was also an epidemic of cholera during 1902 in which not a single native Christian died. This opened many of the non-Christians to question their beliefs and come to find out more about Christianity.

== Death ==
In 1903, Wuhu acquired many new and competent teachers who greatly helped the education work there. Arnold's health began to deteriorate in 1904 but he continued to work into late 1905.

Arnold eventually died of a disease known as sprue (celiac disease) which slowly crept upon him, and which Elizabeth believed was a result of living in unsanitary conditions during many of his long journeys. In all Arnold had worked a total of 16 years in the mission field. After the death of her husband, Elizabeth took the children back to England and Rugby for their initial education and then moved to Hiram, Ohio, where her children went to college. Their home was in the current Hiram Historical Society building.
