= Anna Rosina Gambold =

American Moravian missionary and diarist (1762 - 1821)

Anna Rosina Kliest Gambold (1762 - 1821) was an American Moravian missionary and diarist.

Born Anna Rosina Kliest in Bethlehem, Pennsylvania, Gambold was educated in the single sisters' choir of her community. Beginning in 1788 she was the head teacher of the Seminary for Young Ladies in her birth town, remaining in the role until 1805. There she taught numerous subjects including natural science; later she was the first to make a botanical survey of northern Georgia; in March 1819 an article she had written, in which she had cataloged flowers from along the Conasauga River denoting their scientific names and the uses of the plants in Cherokee medicine and culture, was published in the American Journal of Science and Arts. She married John Gambold in 1805, and moved with him to Springplace, Georgia to evangelize among the Cherokee people. In Springplace the couple established a school. They were, however, hampered in their efforts at missionary work by the complexities of the Cherokee language. Eventually, as part of the removal of the Cherokee from their ancestral lands, the mission was shuttered by the government of the United States. Anna Rosina kept a diary of her time in Georgia; it has been edited and was published in 2007. Kliest died in Springplace and is buried at the mission cemetery there.
