= Francis Dunlap Gamewell =

American missionary (1857-1950)

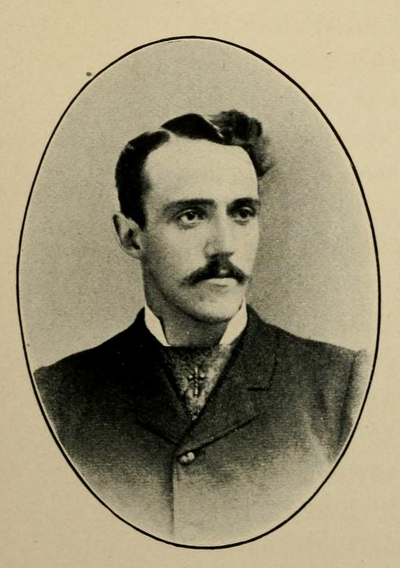
- Frank D. Gamewell
- Born: August 31, 1857; Camden, South Carolina, US
- Died: August 14, 1950 (aged 92); Clifton Springs, New York, US
- Occupation: Methodist missionary to China
- Known for: his work as Chief of Staff of the Committee for Fortifications during the Boxer Rebellion
- Spouses: Mary Porter (m. 1882–1906) Mary Ninde (m. 1909–1947)
- Children: 0

Francis Dunlap Gamewell (August 31, 1857, Camden, South Carolina – August 14, 1950, Clifton Springs, New York) was a Methodist missionary in China. He was the chief of the Fortifications Committee in the Siege of the Legations during the Boxer Rebellion in 1900 and was acclaimed as one of the heroes of the siege.

== Early life ==
Gamewell was the son of an inventor and he inherited the aptitude of his father for tinkering and building. During the American Civil War the family moved from Camden to New Barbadoes Township, New Jersey. Gamewell aspired to become a civil engineer and studied at Rensselaer Polytechnic Institute and Cornell University. Due to illness he was unable to complete his studies, but instead attained a Bachelor of Arts degree from Dickinson College. In June 1880 he was an instructor at a school in Norfolk, Connecticut. After graduation he joined the American Methodist Episcopal Mission and was assigned to Beijing, China – called Peking at that time – as a missionary and the principal of a boys' school.

He arrived in Beijing in October 1881 and in June 1882 he married Mary Q. Porter, also a Methodist missionary. She was 33 years old with 11 years experience in China. He was 24. The couple never had any children. In 1884, he was reassigned to Chongqing as superintendent of the West China Mission. In 1886 a mob attacked the missionary compound, destroyed most of the buildings, and held the missionaries hostage for 16 days. The Gamewells and other missionaries finally escaped, returned to the China coast, and subsequently the United States. During his stay in the US, Gamewell received a doctorate degree from Columbia University. In 1889 the couple returned to Beijing and Gamewell became a physics professor at Yenching University. Over the next several years he supervised construction of churches and other buildings on the Methodist compound, the largest of the Protestant missionary compounds in Beijing

== The Boxer Rebellion ==
In early 1900 an anti-foreign, anti-Christian peasant movement spread northward from Shandong Province taking over control of much of the countryside, burning churches and killing Chinese Christians. The Boxers, as the participants in the movement were called, had substantial support within the Qing dynasty government and from the Empress Dowager Cixi in Beijing.

The Gamewells were planning to leave Beijing by train on June 5, 1900, en route to a furlough in the United States. But the train did not arrive that day or on subsequent days. The Boxers had cut the railroad line to the port of Tianjin. The Gamewells were isolated in Beijing with more than 70 American missionaries. Conditions inside the walls of the city itself became increasingly unsafe for foreigners as Boxers entered the city and menaced foreign establishments. On June 8, all the Protestant American missionaries in Beijing decided to gather in the Methodist compound at which Gamewell was the senior missionary. The Methodist compound was the largest and most defensible of the missionary establishments. It was also near the Legation Quarter where several hundred foreign diplomats and businessmen lived and worked.

== The semi-siege ==
The period between June 8 and June 20 is called the "semi-siege" as foreigners in Peking came increasingly under attack by the Boxers. Gamewell organized the defenses for American and British missionaries and several hundred Chinese Christians in the Methodist compound. He asked for and received 20 Marines from American Minister (ambassador) Edwin H. Conger to assist him in the defense. The Church was converted into a fortress..."the altar was fenced around with a barricade of boxes of condensed milk, biscuit tins, baskets of household silver, etc." The missionaries organized themselves into committees. Chinese Christians were conscripted to dig trenches and build stone and barbed wire barricades. It was good training for the siege to come. While the missionaries were fortifying their compound the Boxers were raging through Peking destroying foreign establishments and executing Chinese Christians. Foreign soldiers in the Legation Quarter exacerbated the situation by firing on Chinese demonstrators and mobs and killing many people.

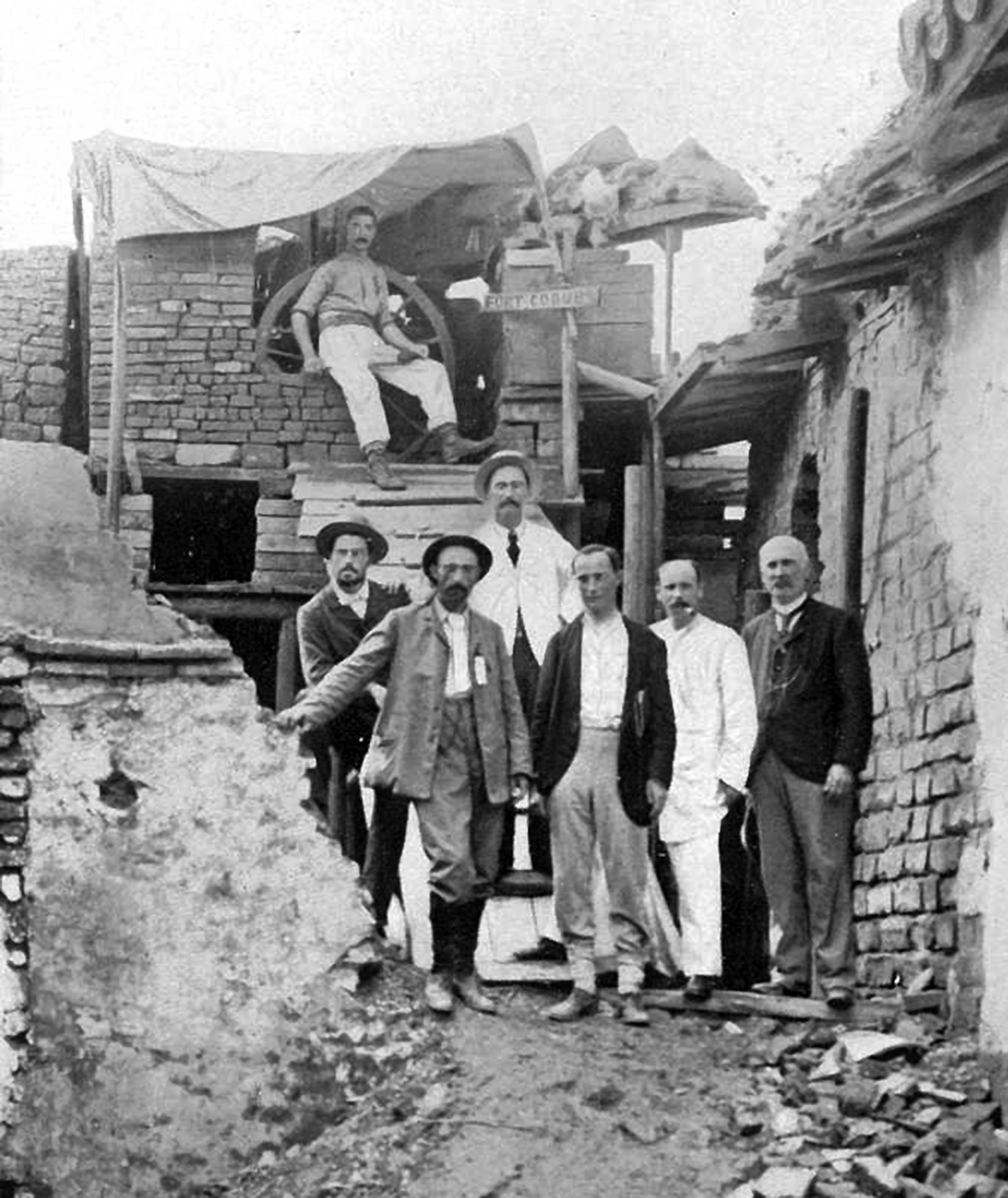
Frank Gamewell (second from left, standing) and the "Fighting Parsons" among their fortifications at the British Legation in Beijing

== The siege of the legations ==
On June 19, the already ominous situation in Beijing took a turn for the worse when the Chinese government ordered all foreigners to leave the city within 24 hours. Fearing they would be massacred if they left the Legation Quarter, the foreigners decided to defy the order. The next morning the German Minister Baron Clemens von Ketteler was murdered in the streets. Conger ordered all the American missionaries to take refuge in the Legation Quarter and that afternoon they and their Chinese converts abandoned the Methodist Compound and walked to the British legation, where all the foreigners in Beijing were offered sanctuary. The Chinese converts were housed elsewhere in the Legation Quarter. When all had gathered there were about 900 foreigners in all, one half being civilians and the other half soldiers from eight different countries, and about 2,800 Chinese Christians.

The next morning, amidst the chaos of hundreds of people milling around the British legation, the British minister Claude Maxwell MacDonald appointed Frank Gamewell as chief of staff of the Committee for Fortifications. He gave Gamewell absolute authority to organize the fortification of the British legation against an anticipated attack by Boxers and the Chinese Army. Gamewell took to the job with alacrity. A British author described him, "G[amewell] is the man of the hour ... Already the British Legation, which at the commencement of the siege was utterly undefended by any entrenchments or sandbags, is rapidly being hustled into order by the masterful hand of this missionary ... the hard worked man always finds time for everything. It is a wonder." The members of Gamewell's fortification committee, missionaries all, were called "the fighting parsons."

Gamewell wanted thousands of sandbags and American missionary women scoured the Legation Quarter for sewing machines and cloth. Curtains, silks, satins, damasks, and expensive cloth of every kind was cut and sewed by missionary women into bags, filled with dirt, and placed on Gamewell's barricades. Gamewell spent his days "superintending the filling of sand-bags, the tearing down of houses adjoining our walls that might serve as cover for the enemy, the building of barricades and strengthening of walls from the timbers and bricks so obtained, [and] making loopholes at the proper places for firing through.

Gamewell's fortifications were needed. Chinese attacks on the Legation Quarter began on June 22 and would continue throughout the 55 days of the siege. He insisted on powerful barricades. At one strong point he had a barricade built eight feet thick, consisting of brick and rubble and earth and capable of withstanding cannon fire.

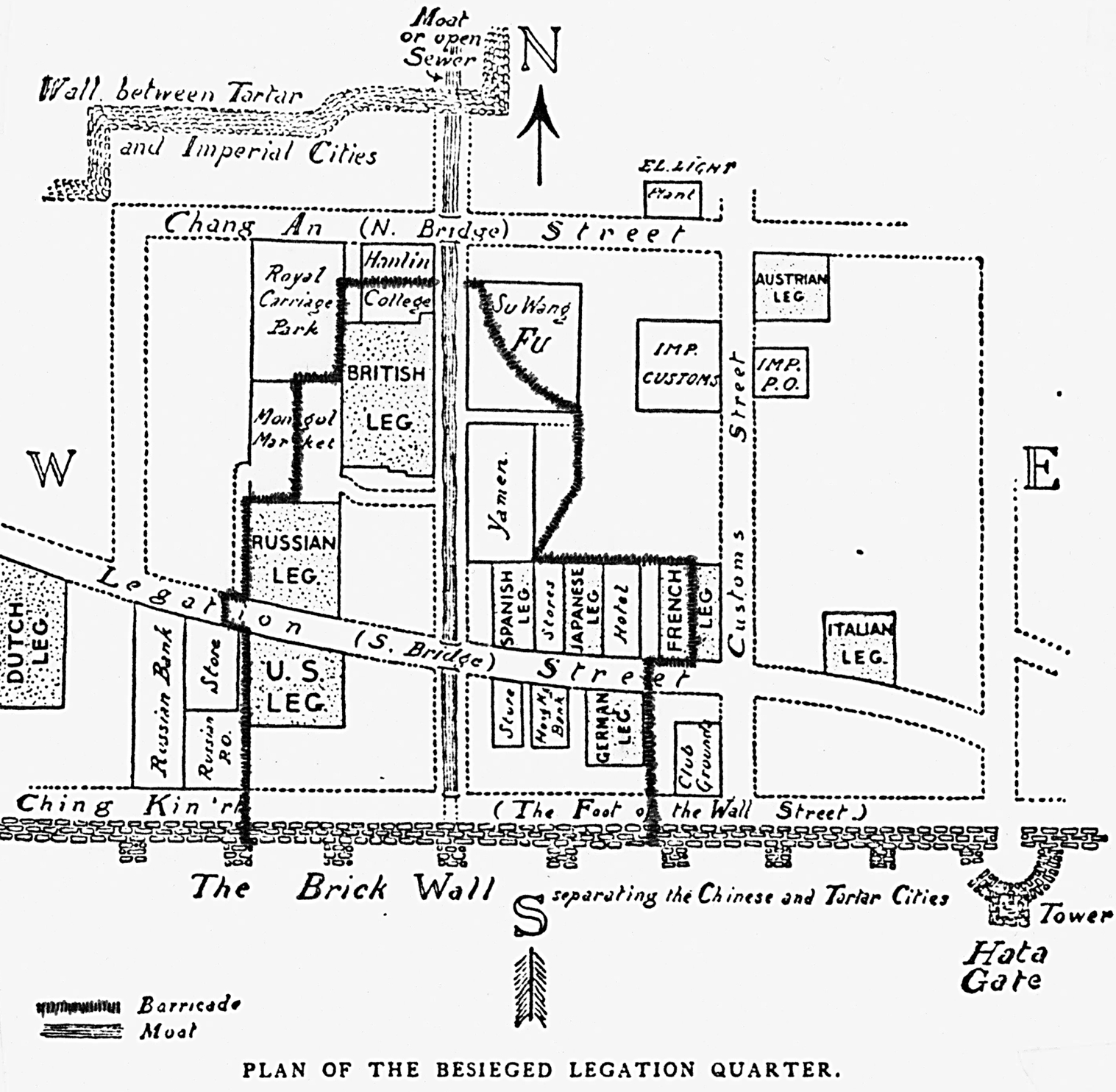
The defensive lines of the Legation Quarter. Gamewell was responsible for the defenses of the British legation, where most of the foreigners took refuge

Gamewell had a new challenge on July 13 when two underground mines exploded beneath the French legation, killing several French soldiers. Gamewell set about digging counter mine trenches ten to twelve feet deep to surround the British legation. In preparation for the last extremity he had bombproof shelters built, trenches six feet deep and covered with timbers and two to four feet of sandbags and earth. Gamewell's fortifications proved effective. Not a single civilian was killed in the British legation (although several were killed defending the Legation Quarter) and the siege became less of a battle than a stalemate with only sporadic Chinese attacks. Gamewell was still strengthening his fortifications when an allied expeditionary force raised the siege and rescued the foreigners and Chinese Christians within the Legation Quarter on August 14, 1900.

== After the Siege ==
On August 21, 1900, the Gamewells and other missionaries departed Beijing to return to the United States. Gamewell's wife, Mary, suffered from anemia and needed medical treatment. Gamewell had with him a letter from Minister Conger which said: "Dear Mr. Gamewell ... to your intelligence and untiring effort, more than to any other man, do we owe our preservation."

== Later life ==
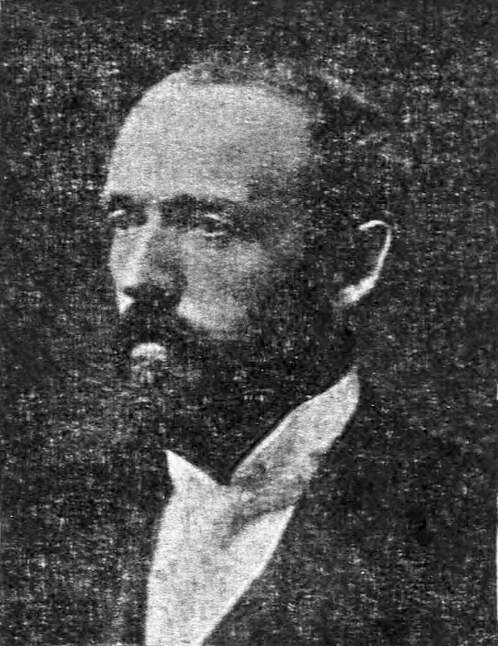
Dr. Frank D. Gamewell (c. 1905)

Gamewell was feted in the United States as a hero of the Boxer Rebellion with honorary degrees from Columbia and Syracuse. He was appointed by the Methodist Church as field secretary and later executive secretary of the Open Door Commission. His wife, Mary, died in 1906. He married again to Mary Ninde (1858–1947) and the couple returned to China as missionaries in 1909. He served 15 years in the position of secretary of education of the Methodist Church in China and 12 years as the general secretary of the China Christian Education Association. He retired to the United States.

== Assessment ==
Frank Gamewell was described during the Siege as "the mildest of men ... a stooping figure, very quiet, and rarely speaks." All the numerous eye-witness accounts of the Boxer Rebellion describe him favorably. He exemplifies what was called "American ingenuity," willing to get his hands dirty—as many were not—in achieving a vital task. He was a master builder and organizer and a quiet but obviously effective leader. He appears never to have had any great success in the missionary endeavor of converting Chinese to Christianity, but rather focused on education, especially science education.
