= Mary Ninde Gamewell =

American writer and missionary (1858-1947)

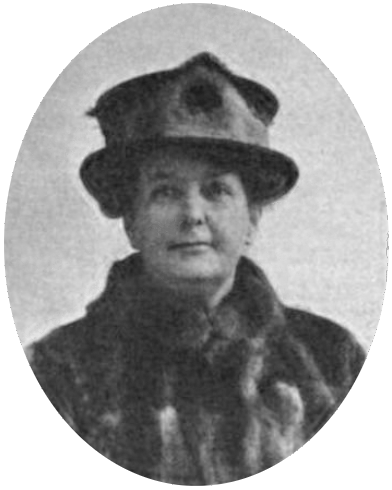
- Born: Mary Louise Ninde; 1858; Adams, New York, U.S.
- Died: August 26, 1947 (aged 88–89); Clifton Springs, New York, U.S.
- Occupations: writer, missionary
- Spouse: Francis Dunlap Gamewell (m. 1909)
- Relatives: William Xavier Ninde (father)
- Writing career
- Subject: missionary work in China
- Notable works: Ming-Kwong, City of the Morning Light (1924)

Mary Ninde Gamewell (née, Ninde; 1858 – August 26, 1947) was an American writer and a missionary to China under the Methodist Board. Her book, Ming-Kwong, City of the Morning Light (1924) became the textbook on China issued by the Central Committee on the United Study of Foreign Missions. Her earlier publications included We Two Alone in Europe (1897), William Xavier Ninde; a memorial (1902), The Gateway to China (1916), and New Life Currents in China (1919).

== Early life ==
Mary Louise Ninde was born in Adams, New York, 1858. Her father, William Xavier Ninde, was, for a time, president of Garrett Biblical Institute and later Bishop of the Methodist Episcopal Church. She had three brothers.

Her early life was spent in Cincinnati, Detroit, Topeka, and Evanston, Illinois.

== Career ==
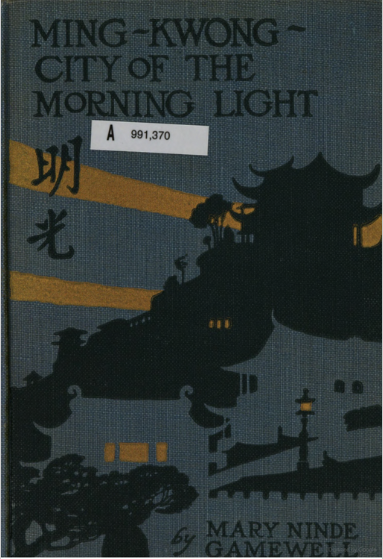
Ming-Kwong, City of the Morning Light

After her graduation from college, Gamewell spent several years in Europe, which led to the writing of her first book, We Two Alone in Europe. This passed through nine editions. Her second book was a biography of her father. Three books on China were subsequently published, the first entitled, The Gateway to China, listed by the China Weekly Review, Shanghai, as one of the best books on China. New Life Currents in China, published in 1919, was widely used by mission study classes. She was also the author of Ming Kwong, City of the Morning Light.

From her earliest years, Gamewell was deeply interested in missions. Immediately after her marriage to Francis Dunlap Gamewell (1857–1950) on May 17, 1909, they started for China, there to engage in missionary work. She traveled extensively with him, his role being General Secretary of the China Christian Educational Association, which took him to every part of the country. When the China Home Missionary Society, an indigenous organization, was formed in 1918, and six Chinese missionaries were sent the following spring to the inaccessible province of Yunnan, Mrs. Gamewell was chosen by this group to accompany them as adviser. She spent several months in Yunnan, seeking to help in all possible ways during the difficult beginnings of a difficult work. For a number of years, she was a member of the Board of Directors of the Cantonese Union Church, Shanghai, an independent Chinese Church. This made her membership on the Board the more significant. For ten years, Gamewell was a member of the National Committee of the Young Women's Christian Association of China.

== Death ==
Mary Ninde Gamewell died at the Clifton Springs Sanitarium, Clifton Springs, New York, August 26, 1947.

== Selected works ==
- We Two Alone in Europe, 1897
- William Xavier Ninde; a memorial, 1902
- The Gateway to China: pictures of Shanghai ... Illustrated, 1916
- New Life Currents in China, 1919
- Ming Kwong, City of the Morning Light, 1924
- If they only knew
- The Chinese Home Missionary Society
