= Mary Porter Gamewell =

American missionary (1848–1906)

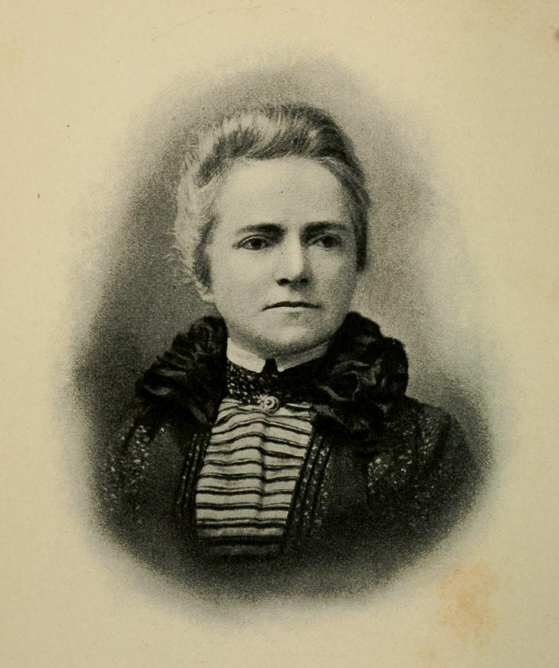
- Mary Porter Gamewell
- Born: October 20, 1848; Alleghany City, Pennsylvania, United States
- Died: November 27, 1906 (aged 58); Summit, New Jersey, United States
- Spouse: Francis Dunlap Gamewell (m. 1882–1906)
- Parents: Nathaniel Porter (father); Dr. Maria Killingley Porter (mother)

Mary Porter Gamewell (née, Mary Porter; missionary pseudonym until marriage, Mary Q. Porter; Chinese name: 贾博慕贞, pinyin: Jiǎ Bó Mùzhēn; October 20, 1848 – November 27, 1906) was an American missionary, teacher, speaker, and writer who founded a school for girls in Beijing, China. She was the first missionary sent out by the Western Branch of the Woman's Foreign Missionary Society, and the first missionary that the organization sent to China. At that time, the Woman's Foreign Missionary Society of the Methodist Episcopal Church had but five missionaries in the world, and she was one of them. She traveled from Davenport, Iowa to Beijing, China in 1871 and started a school for girls, the institution opening with only one girl. It grew very slowly, more so because it was the first school in China to unbind the feet of the girl, an act that engendered great prejudice. By the time of the Boxer Rebellion, the school for girls, which Porter (now Gamewell) referred to as the "Davenport school", had 150 pupils enrolled.

== Early life and education ==
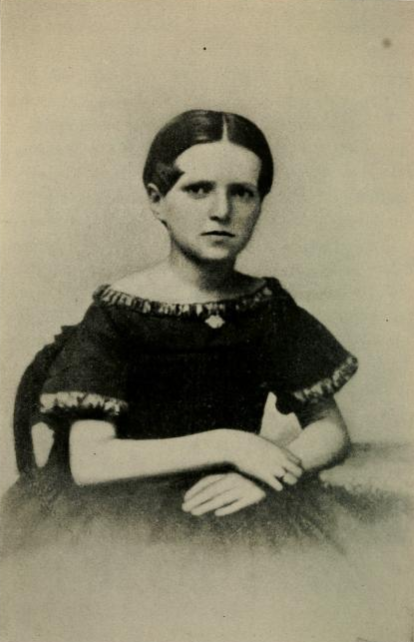
Mary Porter (age 12)

Mary Porter was born in Alleghany City, Pennsylvania on October 20, 1848. (Note: According to the Quad-City Times (28 November 1906), Gamewell was born in Davenport, Iowa.) Her father was Nathaniel Porter and her mother, Dr. Maria Killingley Porter, was a successful practicing physician. Her siblings included sisters Esther and Hannah, and brothers, William and Frank.

Her education was received in part at home before she attended school in Blairsville, Pennsylvania. In 1858, her family moved to Pittsburgh, where she continued her studies, and in 1860, to Davenport, Iowa, where she entered the high school, from which she graduated (1868).

== Career ==
For two years after, she was engaged in teaching at Grandview Academy, and had charge of a class in Latin.

=== Mary Q. Porter ===
Very early in life she united with the Methodist Episcopal Church. She was at one time appointed Sabbath-school superintendent by the unanimous vote of the school. As her religious life developed her mind was directed to the foreign missionary work. After thinking much on the subject, she became thoroughly convinced that it was her duty to follow this cause. Porter anticipated some objection on the part of the Woman's Foreign Missionary Society on account of being under the age required by their rules; but after an interview with her the ladies were so much pleased with her personal appearance and the high character of her testimonials that they determined to waive their arbitrary rule, and secure her services at once. Her thoughts had been directed to Egypt and India as her future field of labor; but when the women wrote advising her of the urgent call to establish a girls' school in Beijing, China and asked if she would go there, Porter signified her willingness to do so.

A strange coincidence was discovered while Porter was preparing to go to China. A person by the name of "Mary Porter" was already living in Beijing, the city to which she was to be sent. Mail matter would certainly be confused, so she must put a middle letter in her name to identify herself. "What shall it be? Query?" she asked of her sister one day. "Q stands for query, let it be Q", and Mary Q. Porter it was until that day in China when she married and changed her name for that of another.

Mary Q. Porter left Iowa, October 14, 1871, and set sail from San Francisco, November 1, in company with Miss Maria Brown as her co-laborer, and Misses Sarah H. and Beulah Woolston, who were returning to their missionary work in Fuzhou after a visit home.

Porter was unable to reach her destination before spring, so she remained in Fuzhou until March 1872, then went to Beijing, and, in company with Miss Brown, entered at once upon the difficult task of establishing a girls' boarding school. The buildings needed repairs and additions, and this, with the amount of labor and patience necessary to overcome the prejudice existing against foreigners, and inducing the Chinese to let their girls come to school, the new experience of housekeeping with servants unacquainted with the ways of "foreign barbarians," and the difficulty of teaching in a language which the new missionaries themselves did not perfectly understand, made the task a formidable one. Porter was a fine musician and singer. Her musical talents were a help to her in her missionary work. She was the main dependence as an organist and in leading the singing, both in school and chapel service. Her many pressing duties during the day led her to do most of her writing at night. In this way she overtaxed her eyes, until they became exceedingly painful and gave her serious trouble.

In 1877, she returned to America and consulted an eminent oculist, who assured her that no serious disease existed, and that with rest and proper care they might be perfectly cured. The ladies of the Missionary Society made her return home the occasion of a reception in the First Methodist Episcopal Church, Davenport, Iowa, December 16. Many of the members of the various churches of the city, with their pastors, were present. Porter then organized the Mary Porter Gamewell Young Women's Foreign Missionary society of the Methodist church, Davenport.

Porter was present at the Eighth Annual Meeting of the General Executive Committee, held in Minneapolis, Minnesota. At the anniversary, held May 17, 1878, she gave an account of her work. While in this country, she did much pioneer missionary work for the ladies' Society, besides visiting auxiliary societies and anniversary meetings.

During her absence from the mission, Letitia A. Campbell, (who had been sent out after Maria Brown's marriage) together with Maria Brown Davis, (formerly Maria Brown,) labored in the school and chapel work, and it was on this account that Porter, contrary to the wishes of her friends, decided to return to Beijing in the autumn of 1878, instead of waiting until spring 1879 to rest and recuperate. On September 20, 1878, Porter left Iowa and started en route for Beijing via San Francisco.

During the Northern Chinese Famine of 1876–1879, many refugees from the stricken districts crowded into the city, and, as a consequence, the typhus broke out, and several of the missionaries fell victims to the disease, Miss Campbell among the number. This was a serious loss to the mission, and Porter was left alone in the school work. This trial was increased by the removal of her friend and co-worker, Maria Brown Davis, who, with her husband and children, went to the Tientsin (Tianjin) Mission, 80 miles (130 km) from Beijing. Porter's duties now were arduous, with the additional labor and increased responsibility; but she labored on until Miss Clara Cushman came to assist.

=== Mrs. Gamewell ===
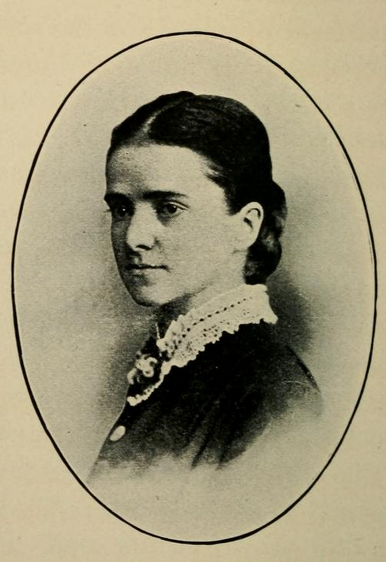
Mary Porter (at the time of marriage)

In October 1881, Francis Dunlap Gamewell arrived in Beijing, and in June 1882, they married. She was 33 years old at the time with eleven years of experience in China. He was 24. The couple never had any children. After marriage, Mrs. Gamewell went with her husband to West China, but they were soon driven out by an uprising. Mrs. Gamewell was mobbed by several hundred Chinese during the temporary absence of her husband from the house. Shortly after, she returned to the U.S. in poor health.

In January 1894, she wrote news from China regarding the North China Mission. In November 1895, she was in Davenport, there to recuperate during the winter. In February 1896, she was lecturing in New Jersey regarding China, and in May of that year, she was back in Davenport.

When they returned to China, the Gamewells again began work in Beijing. Here, they were caught in the 55-day Siege of the International Legations in 1900. Gamewell had charge of the fortifications of the legation during the siege and Mrs. Gamewell rendered service in the making of sandbags and other ways. At the end of October 1900, the Gamewells returned to the U.S., Mrs. Gamewell stopping first in Davenport to rest. The sister with whom she was visiting and the few friends on whom she called noted Mrs. Gamewell's increased nervousness over her condition on her last visit to Davenport, a few years earlier. On November 2, Mrs. Gamewell left for Cincinnati to rejoin her husband, and from there, they traveled to Orange, New Jersey, Dr. Gamewell's old home. Subsequently, Mrs. Gamewell suffered from a nervous breakdown.

In June 1904, en route to San Francisco to join her husband and return to China, Mrs. Gamewell stopped in Davenport to speak regarding the work the missionaries did in China, and of the manner in which the Boxer uprising further opened up the missionary field.

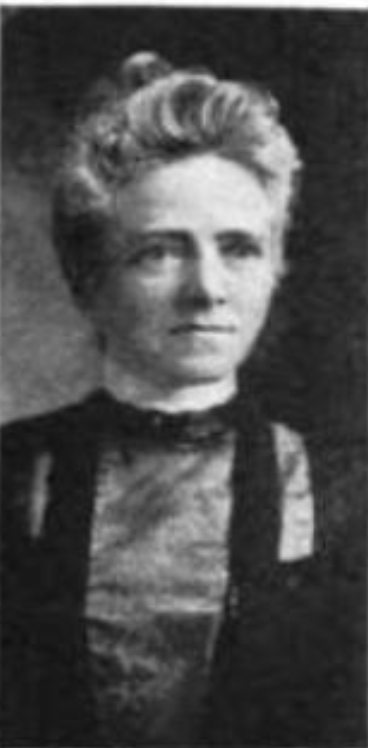
Gamewell in 1906

During the summer of 1906, she visited with her brother and sister in Davenport and announced that she would return in the fall to her work in Beijing. Her poor health had compelled her to put off the time of the travel, settling upon January 1, 1907, but a few weeks earlier, on November 12, 1906, she lay unconscious, dying from hardening of the arteries at the home of her sister-in-law, Mrs. Tuttle, in Summit, New Jersey. Mrs. Gamewell died at Summit, New Jersey, November 27, 1906. Interment was at a cemetery at Hackensack, New Jersey.

Her account of the Boxer Rebellion was published posthumously in Mary Porter Gamewell and her story of the siege in Peking (1907).

== Selected works ==
- Mary Porter Gamewell and her story of the siege in Peking (1907)
