= Carrie Judd Montgomery =

American writer

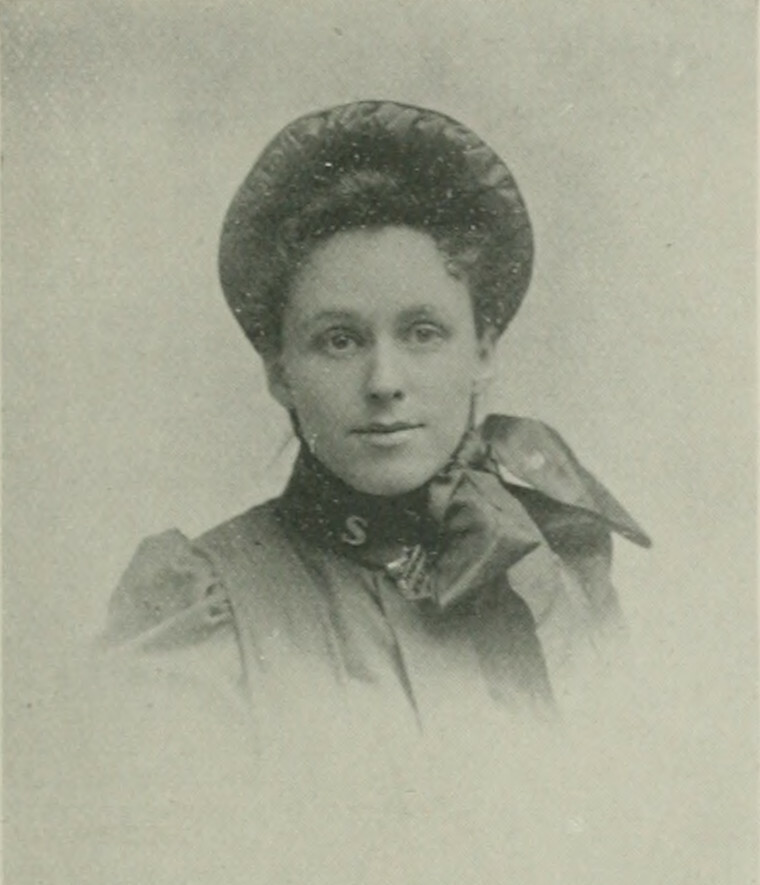
- Photo in A Woman of the Century
- Born: Carrie Frances Judd; April 8, 1858; Buffalo, New York, US
- Died: July 26, 1946 (aged 88); Oakland, California, US
- Occupations: Evangelist, writer and editor
- Years active: 1870s-1940s

Carrie Frances Judd Montgomery (April 8, 1858 – July 26, 1946) was an American editor, philanthropist, woman preacher, faith healer, evangelist, radical evangelical, and writer. She was influential in the American Divine Healing Movement in the late 19th century. Additionally, she played a significant role in promoting Faith healing and Pentecostalism throughout her writings. She was the first to open a healing home on the West Coast.

== Childhood ==
Montgomery, the fourth of eight children, was born on April 8, 1858, and spent her early days in Buffalo, New York, where the revival of 1857-1858 was underway. The family were Episcopalians and Montgomery was confirmed to the church in 1869. During her childhood years, she lost two of her siblings to severe illnesses. Because of her own deteriorating health, at fifteen years old, her brother invited her to live with him in another area of New York which had a better climate. During her time there, she worked for an editor of a health magazine. After a return home to help care for several sick family members, she moved to another part of New York with the same brother. During her year stay, she started up a Sunday school with the neighborhood children. When she returned home, she was healthy enough to return to her own schooling.

== Introduction to faith healing ==
One cold winter day in 1876 as she was walking to school, she slipped and fell hard on the icy ground. She continued to school that day but shortly after her health began to rapidly deteriorate. Soon after the accident, on January 6, 1877, Carrie found out that she had spinal fever. What "seemed to be tuberculosis of the spine" developed into "tuberculosis of the blood" which forced Carrie to give up school and her aspirations of becoming a school teacher. Her days in bed grew into months and then years. Being "prostrated with spinal complaint…the trouble extended to all the large joints. Her hips, knees, and ankles could not be touched, even by herself without great suffering." For over eleven months she could not even sit up on her own. She could not even handle light or much time with people. A small pillow under her head felt "like a block of stone." Her days in bed grew into months and then years. At a time when those around her were expecting her death at any moment, even her mother allowing friends into her room to say their last goodbyes, her father came across a unique article in the local newspaper.

The article told of the account of Mrs. Edward Mix, a "colored woman" named Sarah from Connecticut, being healed of tuberculosis through the prayers of Mr. Ethan Allan. Sarah Freeman Mix is the first recorded African-American female healing evangelist in the U.S. Upon hearing about Mix's healing, Carrie asked her sister Eva to send Mrs. Mix a letter requesting healing prayer from her. To their surprise, the Judd family received a quick response from Mrs. Mix. The prayer found in James 5:15 was central to the letter as well as an encouragement to act in faith regardless of how she felt. In the letter was also a specific set apart time where both sides would pray at the same time for Carrie’s healing. Even though no one showed up to Mrs. Mix’s regular prayer meeting that day due to poor weather, she and her husband prayed for Carrie nonetheless.

During their set apart time of prayer, on February 26, 1879, Carrie engaged in a spiritual battle. Finally, she felt it was time to act in faith and get up out of bed. Unassisted, she walked over to the nearby chair. Her healing process was ignited from that day forward. By April of that same year, she was well enough to use the stairs and go outside to visit the neighbors. In the years that followed, she corresponded with Mrs. Mix. At one point Mrs. Mix even came to visit and they went out into the city to pray for healing of those who were sick.

== Ministry ==
News of Carrie’s healing spread and she soon became the talk of the town. People heard of her story in newspapers and wrote letters to her asking if she was really healed. Many people came to her to hear of her story and to receive prayer. Her compassion was stirred and she opened up a room in her parents’ home to receive such people. Soon after, she decided to open up a healing home in Buffalo, New York in April, 1882. This was one of the first healing homes in New York and was used as a model for many future healing homes in the country.

Carrie was also a prolific writer and her poetry was published in The Magazine of Poetry and Literary Review in 1894. Based on the prayer found in James 5 and her own healing experience, she wrote The Prayer of Faith (1880) to encourage others to embrace and take hold of their healing, despite receiving criticism and discouragement including from people she trusted. This book was significant because it was among some of first prominent books written on the subject of divine healing in her time. In 1881, she also initiated a magazine called Triumphs of Faith which emphasized holiness and divine healing. She continued to write and edit this journal for over 60 years and Sarah Mix also contributed to the journal.

Carrie became an itinerant preacher and teacher and traveled internationally throughout her life to share her story of healing and encourage people in their faith. Her zeal to spread the somewhat unpopular message of divine healing at that time put her in a category of a radical evangelical. Through her close friendship with Albert Benjamin Simpson she eventually became a part of the forming of the Christian and Missionary Alliance (CMA). Simpson continually encouraged and created space for her to step out and share her story. Carrie transcended denominational barriers as she shared her story, speaking at Baptist (including The Temple in Old Orchard Beach, Maine, in 1910), Presbyterian, Episcopalian, Salvation Army, Alliance, and other gatherings. Not too long after the Civil War and in a time before Martin Luther King Jr. came to the scene, she also preached to African Americans. In 1889 Carrie experienced some persecution and even some churches shutting their doors to her, first because she was a woman preacher and second because she spoke to African Americans.

In 1892, Montgomery's donated land to form the Home for Aged and Infirm Colored People of California in Beulah, California.

== Marriage ==
In 1890, Carrie married a successful businessman, George S. Montgomery, who was previously healed of diabetes and afterwards had "consecrated himself to the Lord’s service." He brought her from Buffalo, New York to Oakland, California. With her husband’s constant support and great provision of resources, she opened up an orphanage and a training center there and also worked in Beulah Heights, California. Then she worked in Cazadero, California, where she formed Shalom Training School in 1894 and Cazadero Camp in 1927, which was leased to neighboring cities. The Montgomerys also owned and operated a public utility water system in Cazadero. She also worked closely with the Salvation Army. The Montgomery’s also built The Home of Peace which is still there to this day. This was the first healing home on the West Coast and through Carrie’s move to California, she was one of the first early advocates of divine healing on the west side of the nation. In several histories of the Divine Healing Movement, Carrie is the only woman listed among the other key shapers in the movement of Charles Cullis, A. B. Simpson, A. J. Gordon, William E. Boardman, Andrew Murray, and other men. She and her husband also became honorary officers in the Salvation Army before the turn of the 20th century.

== Pentecostalism ==
When birth of American Pentecostalism arose through the Azusa Street Revival in California in 1906, Carrie, although hesitantly at first, eventually received her what Pentecostalism refers to as "Spirit baptism" in 1908, at age 50. Evangelist Francisco Olazábal was converted to Pentecostalism by the Montgomerys in 1916. This experience deeply impacted her life and spirituality and the theme of Spirit baptism became integrated into her magazine and her teaching. Because of her great reputation, she was used as a bridge between Evangelicals and Pentecostals. To the Evangelicals, she had a voice to introduce Spirit baptism to them without all the fanaticism and to the Pentecostals, she remained balanced and didn’t overemphasize the practice of speaking in tongues. By 1914, she was part of what would later be called the Assemblies of God, starting as a charter member before becoming an assemblies minister in 1917. Throughout her life, Carrie became personal friends with Charles Cullis, A.B. Simpson, William Booth, Minnie Abrams, Pandita Ramabai, Elizabeth Baxter, Maria Woodworth-Etter, and William J. Seymour. She was connected to Smith Wigglesworth, Aimee Semple McPherson, John G. Lake, Finis E. Yoakum, George Peck, and many other prominent Christian leaders in her time. In 1922, she published Heart Melody and her autobiography in 1936. She continued her ministry including involvement with the Woman's Christian Temperance Union until her death on July 26, 1946, and was succeeded by her only child, Faith Berry.
