= Ebenezer Bible College and Seminary =

Christian school in Zamboanga CIty, Philippines

Ebenezer Bible College and Seminary, Inc.
- Former names: Ebenezer Bible Institute (1928-1962); Ebenezer Bible College (1962-1974)
- Motto: Hitherto Hath the Lord Helped Us
- Type: Bible college
- Established: July 2, 1928
- Founder: Christian and Missionary Alliance missionaries
- Affiliations: CAMACOP
- Academic affiliations: PABATS, ACSI-PHIL, ZAMBASULTAPS
- Location: Zamboanga City, Philippines; 6°55′24″N 122°01′27″E
- Website: ebcs.edu.ph
- Location in Mindanao Location in the Philippines

The Ebenezer Bible College and Seminary (abbreviated EBCS) is a Christian and Missionary Alliance Churches of the Philippines (CAMACOP) Bible institution in Zamboanga City, Philippines. It's the oldest and the largest by area Bible institution of CAMACOP.

== History ==
=== The Ebenezer Schools (1903-1928) ===
When C&MA missionaries arrived at Zamboanga City in the 1900s, they realized they need a Bible school to train Filipinos in the way of the Lord. Ebenezer was built upon a foundation of two Christian day schools known as the Ebenezer Schools. The first school was for girls was established by Rev. David Lund and Mrs. Hulda Lund in 1903 and the school for boys was established by Rev. John A. McMillan in 1920. The school for girls was located in Barangay Tetuan, while the school for boys was in Barangay Mercedes.

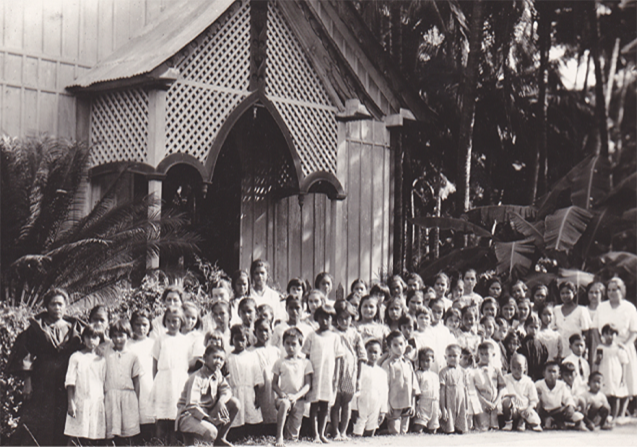
Students of the Ebenezer School in front of the Tetuan Evangelical Church in Zamboanga, 1924.

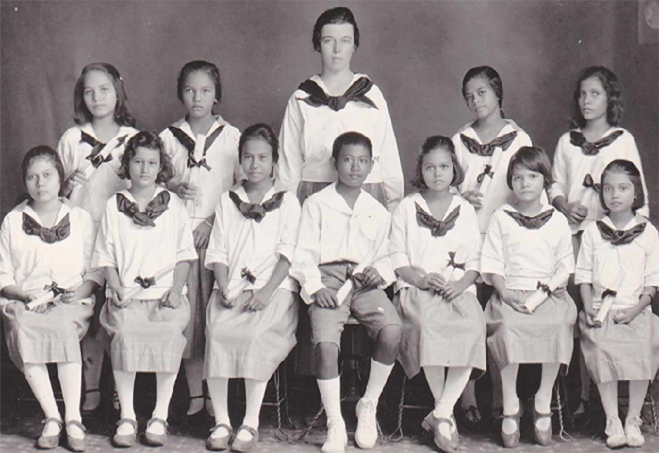
The 1924 intermediate graduates of the Ebenezer Schools.

=== The Ebenezer Bible Institute ===
In 1925, Rev. Robert A. Jaffray, head of the C&MA South China field, visited the Philippines to assess the viability of the missionary work being conducted. He recommended the establishment of a Bible school to expand missionary work in the Western Mindanao region. So, in 1926, the first classes for theological training were begun. Then on July 2, 1928, the two schools were merged to form the Ebenezer Bible Institute, with Rev. George Strohm as its first principal.

=== Post-war restoration ===
Classes were suspended during World War II and only resumed in 1946 by Rev. Herbert Jackson. For the first time in 1950, the Ebenezer Principal went to a Filipino, Rev. Vicente Pada. Ebenezer later transferred to their present location in Calarian on July 12, 1957, after years of discussion since the Tetuan campus was already small to accommodate the growing number of students.

In June 1962, the Ebenezer School Board voted to rename the school as the Ebenezer Bible College under the recommendation of Dr. Walter Roberto, an American educational consultant in the Philippines, with Principal Pada automatically becoming its first director. In 1984, Dr. Adynna Lim became the first woman head of the institution and served until 1993.

=== 21st century ===
The Commission on Higher Education granted recognition to EBCS in 2002, making it the only ecclesiastical institution of CAMACOP being recognized by the government to date.

== Ebenezer Leaders ==
Term in Office	Name
Ebenezer Bible Institute
1928–1929	Principal Rev. George D. Strohm
1930–1931	Principal Harry W. Edwonds
1932–1935	Principal Rev. Robert R. Hess
1936	Principal Rev. Herbert A. Jackson
1937–1941	Principal Rev. Robert R. Hess
World War II (1941–1945)
Ebenezer Bible Institute (restored)
1946	Principal Rev. Herbert A. Jackson
1947–1951	Principal Rev. Ernest F. Gulbranson
1951–1952	Principal Rev. Robert R. Hess
1952–1958	Principal Rev. Vicente R. Pada
1958–1959	Principal Rev. Robert R. Hess
1959–1962	Principal Rev. Vicente R. Pada
Ebenezer Bible College
1962–1967	Director Rev. Vicente R. Pada
1967–1973	Director Dr. Rodrigo D. Tano
1973–1974	Director Rev. Vicente R. Pada
Ebenezer Bible College and Seminary
1974–1979	President Rev. Vicente R. Pada
1979–1984	President Dr. Rodrigo D. Tano
1984–1993	President Dr. Adynna Y. Lim
1993–1998	President Dr. Joel I. Ortiz
1998–1999	Management Team
1999–2005	President Dr. Benjamin P. de Jesus
2005–2012	President Dr. Joel Caperig
2012–2017	President Rev. Roland Don S. Dulaca
2017	Management Team
2017-2025	President Dr. Richard Rojas
2025–present	OIC-President Rev. Ricky Lagare

== Gallery ==
Ebenezer Community Alliance Church

Ebenezer Convention Center

== See also ==
- Christian and Missionary Alliance Churches of the Philippines
