= Knaggs =

Knaggs is an English surname, whose bearers include:

- Charlie Knaggs, Colonel in the Irish Guards
- Henry Valentine Knaggs (1859–1954), physician and author
- James Knaggs, territorial commander, Western USA Salvation Army
- Sir Samuel William Knaggs (1856–1924), civil servant (West Indies)
- Skelton Knaggs (1911–1955), stage actor and horror movie actor
- Thomas Knaggs (1661–1724), preacher and publisher of sermons
- Whitmore Knaggs (1763–1827), US fighter, linguist and spy
