= Robert A. Jaffray =

Canadian missionary (1873–1945)

- Born: Robert Alexander Jaffray; 1873
- Died: July 29, 1945 (aged 71–72)
- Occupations: missionary statesman, pastor, preacher, writer, editor
- Spouse: Minnie Jaffray
- Parent(s): Robert Jaffray, Sarah Bugg

Robert Alexander Jaffray (1873 – July 29, 1945) was a missionary to China, Indonesia and several other countries, with The Christian & Missionary Alliance, who served as the founding principal of the Alliance Bible Seminary, in Hong Kong, and principal contributor and editor of the Chinese language Bible Magazine. Jaffrey founded the first Chinese missionary society called the "Chinese Foreign Missionary Union" (CFMU) in 1929. His life is chronicled in the biography, Let my people go!: The life of Robert A. Jaffray (1947), by A.W. Tozer.

== Family background ==
Robert Jaffray, was born in 1873, the son of Robert Jaffray and Sarah Bugg. The family was wealthy; his father owned Canada's Toronto Globe (today's the Globe and Mail). Robert's father had great ambitions for his child, wanting him to one day become the CEO and owner of Toronto Globe.

== Calling to missionary service ==
As a young man, Jaffray sensed that he had a calling to become a missionary. After having an encounter with the founder of The Christian & Missionary Alliance, A.B. Simpson, Jaffray decided that his calling was to serve as a missionary to China. His father was deeply opposed to this and threatened not to pay for his expenses to travel to China, although he would be willing to pay for the return trip if young Robert ever wanted to return from his long-term missions.

== Missionary work ==
The Christian & Missionary Alliance sent Jaffray to Wuzhou, Guangxi, China, in 1897. He served as leader of all C&MA work in south China. While he was there, his responsibilities included mission administration, preaching, evangelistic itineration, assistance in founding the Wuzhou Bible School (later called the "Alliance Seminary in Hong Kong"), editor of the Chinese "Bible Magazine", and writer for his publications. The Chinese-language Bible Magazine, which he edited and for which he wrote many of the articles, was read in Chinese communities all over the world. Jaffray was known for his leadership qualities and was called a "missionary strategist and statesman." He wrote for and edited, Bible Messenger, published by South China Alliance Press. He used this publication to send training materials to Cantonese missionaries and then later to others, reprinted in their "colloquial language versions."

One year after arriving in Wuzhou, Jaffray began making trips to what is now Vietnam (at the time it was French Indochina). In 1916, although he was still based in China, he was elected Superintendent of the Vietnam Field.

To meet the urgent need of serving overseas Chinese in South East Asia, Jaffray founded the CFMU to send out missionaries to Indonesia, Thailand and the Philippines. He refused to be the president of the CFMU and believed that Chinese leaders should take up the role instead, so that they could adopt their own ideas in the future. He had Chinese evangelists, Dr Rev. Leland Wang Zai (王载) and his younger brother, Rev. Wilson Wang Zhi (王峙) as key leaders to steer this agency. They would travelled for the next several decades, Dr Rev Leland until his death 1975, and Rev Wilson until 1995, to wherever Chinese could be found in the South China Sea, Japan, Australia, Europe, England and the Americas, to preach, evangelize and set up churches. As leader of this missionary agency, Dr Wang Zai (also called Leland Wang), became known as "Moody of China.

Jaffray served in Wuzhou for 35 years, in spite of a heart condition and diabetes. In 1942, Japan invaded an island in Indonesia where he was stationed with his wife, Minnie, and his daughter. Soon after the invasion, Jaffray and other missionaries were arrested by the Japanese, and sent to internment camps. Jaffray remained captive until his death in 1945 from illness and malnutrition.

== Quotes ==
- "The supreme and crying need of this lost world is the Gospel. Shall we not rise at Christ's command to carry the blessed saving news to every perishing one?"

== Sources ==
- Tozer, A.W. (1947). Let my people go!: The life of Robert A. Jaffray ISBN 0-87509-189-X
- To All People, Niklaus
- Indonesia August 2004: Field Facts: Working the Soil
