= Christian and Missionary Alliance Churches of the Philippines =

Christian evangelical group

The Christian and Missionary Alliance Churches of the Philippines, Inc.
- Jesus Christ is our Savior, Sanctifier, Healer and the Coming King
- Classification: Protestant
- Orientation: Evangelical Christian; Trinitarian
- Theology: Evangelical theology
- Polity: Mixed polity, including Congregationalist, Presbyterian and Episcopal elements
- Executive Bishop and President: Bishop Joseph I. Reyes
- Auxiliary Bishop and Vice President: Bishop David P. Dasig
- Associations: Philippine Council of Evangelical Churches; Alliance World Fellowship; World Evangelical Alliance
- Region: Philippines
- Headquarters: 13 West Capitol Drive, Brgy. Kapitolyo, Pasig City, Metro Manila 1603
- Founder: C&MA Missionaries (see Albert Benjamin Simpson)
- Origin: 1901; Tetuan, Zamboanga City
- Congregations: 500,000 (estimate as of 2017)
- Official website: camacop.life

The Christian And Missionary Alliance Churches of the Philippines (CAMACOP) is a Christian evangelical group in the Philippines that originated from The Christian and Missionary Alliance (C&MA). It is one of the largest evangelical groups in the Philippines and has 2917 churches within the country.

== History ==
CAMACOP was incorporated in 1947 as a national church of the C&MA Philippine Missions. The Christian and Missionary Alliance in the USA expanded its mission works in the Philippines in 1902. The C&MA was assigned in Zamboanga - Sulu Archipelago and Cotabato – Davao regions of Mindanao.

The first Alliance Church was planted in 1902 in Tetuan, Zamboanga City, the first Protestant church on the island of Mindanao, which still exists today.

After the Second World War, the local churches planted by C&MA Missionaries decided to organize themselves as a national church. Thus in 1947 the first 13 local churches incorporated themselves as The Christian and Missionary Alliance Churches of the Philippines, and in 1949 CAMACOP was registered with the Securities and Exchange Commission (SEC) thus became a legal personality.

It is headed by the National Executive Board of Trustees, which consists of the CAMACOP President, CAMACOP Vice-President, ministers, and laymen. In 2005, the CAMACOP By-Laws were amended to add the title of Executive Bishop to the CAMACOP president and the title of Auxiliary Bishop to the CAMACOP vice-president.

== The Presidency ==
When CAMACOP was established in 1947, Rev. Jeremias Dulaca was elected chairman (now President) of CAMACOP. He served until 1957 when Rev. Florentino de Jesus, Sr succeeded him.

Rev. de Jesus served until 1960, when Rev. Dulaca was elected again as CAMACOP president. Unfortunately, Rev. Dulaca suddenly died of a heart attack on September 18, 1962. Dulaca left a legacy as the founding president of the denomination. He was then succeeded by Vice-President Rev. Leodegario Madrigal. Rev. Madrigal was elected to a full term as president in 1963.

In the CAMACOP 1966 General Assembly, Rev. Vicente Pada, director of the Ebenezer Bible College was elected president of CAMACOP. In 1972, Rev. Leo Madrigal was elected again as president. During his tenure, the CAMACOP church population of 400 was doubled to 800 by the time Madrigal's term ended in 1978.

In the 1978 General Assembly, Dr. Benjamin de Jesus, son of former president Florentino de Jesus, Sr. was elected president of the denomination. He was re-elected twice in 1981 and 1985. He was replaced by Dr. Valmike Apuzen in 1989. He was reelected in 1993 and was succeeded by Vice-President Dr. Rodrigo Tano in 1997. Dr. Jose Dalino was then elected president in 2001 and was succeeded by Vice-President Rev. Reniel Joel Nebab in 2005. He was reelected in 2009.

A proposed amendment to the CAMACOP By-laws was discussed during the 2011 General Assembly to extend the President's term limit from two to three terms. Incumbent President then-Dr. Nebab was allowed to run again but was defeated in the election by his predecessor, Dr. Jose Dalino during the 2013 General Assembly. In 2017, Bishop Eduardo Cajes was elected as CAMACOP president, and won the 2021 CAMACOP elections.

== The Administrative Divisions ==
Four administrative branches or divisions currently administer the denomination, each headed by a National Executive Minister (NEM):

1. Division of Church Ministries (DCM)
2. Division of Education (DE)
3. Division of Finance and Stewardship (DFS)
4. Division of Missions (DM)

=== Division of Church Ministries ===
The Division of Church Ministers can be compared to the Philippines' Department of the Interior and Local Government. This division administers and coordinates with the various local churches of CAMACOP. Each local church is handled by districts and by regions. In tradition, the Vice-President was appointed to this post.

=== Division of Education ===
This Division is similar to the functions of the Philippines' Department of Education. It administers all CAMACOP-owned schools and seminaries. Its current plan is to build an all-new and first Alliance University in the Philippines.

=== Division of Finance and Stewardship ===
This Division handles all financial transactions of the CAMACOP. The National Treasurer is under this office.

=== Division of Missions ===
This Division administers all missionary outreaches of the denomination.

== Incumbent Officials ==
- CAMACOP President/Executive Bishop:

Bishop Joseph I. Reyes

- CAMACOP Vice-President/Auxiliary Bishop:

Bishop David P. Dasig

- National Executive Minister-Division of Church Ministries (NEM-DCM):

Dr. Richard C. Rojas

- National Executive Minister-Division of Education (NEM-DE):

Dr. Lyndon L. Ladera

- National Executive Minister-Division of Stewardship and Finance (NEM-DFS):

Bishop David P. Dasig

- National Executive Minister-Division of Missions (NEM-DM):

Rev. Richie P. Maraat

== Ministries ==
CAMACOP Ministries includes Local Churches, Schools, Seminaries, Training Center, Lay Preaching, Youth Program, Evangelistic Program and Overseas Missionary Program.

=== Organized ministries ===
CAMACOP Organized Ministries as follows:

- Alliance Men Philippines (AMP)
- Alliance Women Philippines (AWP)
- Alliance Youth Philippines (AYP)
- Alliance World Mission (AWM)
- The Alliance Theological Education by Extension (ALL-TEE)
- Philippine Student Alliance Lay Movement Inc. (PSALM)
- Ministry Arm to the unreached people groups (Muslims): C-CMA (Cross-Cultural Ministries and Advocacy)

=== Geographical Divisions ===
CAMACOP is divided by 6 Regions and 29 districts in the Philippines

- LUZON
  - North Central Luzon Region (NCLR)
    - Highland Evangelical Churches Alliance (HECA)
      - A District of Cordillera Administrative Region except Abra
    - Central Luzon District (CLD)
      - A District of Nueva Ecija, Tarlac, Zambales, Pampanga, Bataan, Bulacan and Aurora
    - North Eastern Luzon District (NELD)
      - A District of Region II (Nueva Viscaya, Isabela, Quirino, Cagayan), except Batanes
    - North Western Luzon District (NWLD)
      - A District of Region I (Ilocos Norte and Sur, La Union, Pangasinan), including Abra
  - Metro Manila-Southern Luzon Region (MMSLR)
    - Metro Manila District (MMD)
      - A District of NCR
    - South Eastern Luzon District (SELD)
      - formerly called the Southern Tagalog District, encompasses CALABARZON and the provinces of Mindoro, Marinduque and Romblon
      - Today, It is called "District of Southern Tagalog (DST)", but Rizal and a small Northern part of Quezon (which is the East and the same size of Rizal) separated the District.
    - Eastern Luzon Commission (ELC)
      - A District of Rizal and the small Northern part of Quezon
    - Palawan District (PD)
      - encompasses only the province of Palawan
    - Bicol District (BD)
      - encompasses Bicol Region
- VISAYAS
  - Visayas Region (VR)
    - Cebu-Bohol-Leyte-Samar District (CEBOLESA)
      - However, CEBOLESA had separated in two districts:
        - Central Visayas District
          - A District of Cebu and Bohol
        - Eastern Visayas District
          - A District of Leyte and the Southern, Samar (province) and the North and East, and Biliran
    - North West Visayas District
      - A District of Aklan, Capiz, Antique, Iloilo, Guimaras, Negros Occidental
    - South West Visayas District • A District of Negros Oriental & Siquijor
- MINDANAO
  - Western Mindanao Region (WMR)
    - Zamboanga-Basilan District (ZAMBAS)
      - divided by 6 Zones:
        - Zone 1 encompasses the province of Basilan;
        - Zone 2 encompasses the churches in the urbanized barangays of Zamboanga City;
        - Zone 3 encompasses the churches in the rural barangays of District II of Zamboanga City;
        - Zone 4 encompasses the churches in the rural barangays of District I of Zamboanga City;
        - Zone 5 encompasses the municipalities of Sibuco and Sirawai of the province of Zamboanga del Norte;
        - Zone 6 encompasses the municipalities of Siocon and Baliguian of the province of Zamboanga del Norte.
    - West Mindanao District (WMD)
      - However, this district was not exist
    - North West Mindanao District (NWMD)
      - A District of Zamboanga del Norte
    - Central West Mindanao District (CWMD)
      - A District of the half of Zamboanga Sibugay (West)
    - East Zamboanga District (EZD)
      - A District of the half of Zamboanga Sibugay (East)
    - North Mindanao District (NMD)
      - A District of Zamboanga del Sur and Misamis Occidental
    - Sulu-Tawi-Tawi District (STTD)
      - A District of Sulu and Tawi-Tawi
  - North East Central Mindanao Region (NECMR)
    - Metro Davao District (MDD)
      - A District of Davao City
    - North Central Mindanao District (NCMD)
      - A District of Bukidnon, Lanao del Sur, Lanao del Norte and Misamis Oriental
    - North East Mindanao District (NEMD)
      - A District of Davao del Norte, Davao de Oro (formerly called Compostela Valley), Davao Oriental, Agusan del Sur, Agusan del Norte, Surigao del Sur and Surigao del Norte
    - District of Mount Apo (DOMA)
      - A District of Davao del Sur and Davao Occidental
    - North East Cotabato District (NECD)
      - A District of East Cotabato and Northwest of Davao City
  - South Central Mindanao Region (SCMR)
    - South Mindanao District (SMD)
      - A District of the North of South Cotabato
    - Central Mindanao District (CMD)
      - A District of Cotabato and Maguindanao
    - Sultan District
      - A District of Sultan Kudarat
    - Sarangani District
      - A District of Sarangani (which is the East of South Cotabato, West of Davao Occidental and South of Davao del Sur)
    - South Mindanao Cultural Communities District (SMCCD)
      - A District of Sarangani (which is the South of South Cotabato) and the Southeast of South Cotabato
    - South Mindanao Highland District (SMHD)
      - A District of South Cotabato

=== Seminaries ===
List of Bible Schools and Seminaries in CAMACOP

- Alliance Graduate School (AGS) (Quezon City)
- Ebenezer Bible College and Seminary (EBCS) (Zamboanga City)
- Mount Apo Alliance Bible College (MAABC) (Cotabato)
- Davao Alliance College Inc. (DACI) (Davao City)
- Shekinah Alliance Bible College (SABC) (General Santos)
- Philippine Alliance College of Theology (PACT) (Manila)
- Visayas Alliance School of Theology (VAST) (Cebu City)
- Lommasson Alliance Bible College (LABC) (Lapuyan, Zamboanga del Sur)
- Mickelson Memorial Bible College (MMBC) (Sarangani)

Tribal Bible School

- Dipolog Alliance School of Christian Leadership and Evangelism (DASCLE) (Dipolog)

CAMACOP-owned Schools

- Albert Benjamin Simpson Alliance School (ABSAS) (Zamboanga City)
- Fil-Asian Mission Academy (FAMA) (Davao City)
- Grace Learning Center (GLC) (Basilan)

== See also ==
- Christian and Missionary Alliance
