= Fourfold Gospel =

Fourfold Gospel may refer to:

- the four canonical gospels of Matthew, Mark, Luke and John considered collectively
- the doctrine of the Full Gospel as taught by Albert Benjamin Simpson
