= Olazábal =

Olazábal is a Basque surname. Notable people with the surname include:

- Tirso Olazábal Lardizábal (1842–1921), Spanish politician
- Juan Olazábal Ramery (1860–1937), Spanish politician
- Francisco Olazábal (1886–1937), Mexican Pentecostal evangelist
- José María Olazábal (born 1966), Spanish golfer
- Oier Olazábal (born 1989), Spanish footballer
