= Warren Memorial Presbyterian Church =

Church building in Louisville, Kentucky, United States

Coordinates: 38°14′45.4″N 85°45.0′31″W

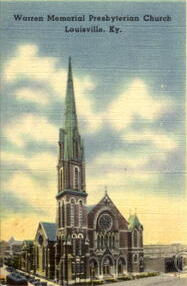
Warren Memorial Presbyterian Church pictured in a postcard ca. 1928.

Warren Memorial Presbyterian Church was a Presbyterian congregation formerly located in what is now downtown Louisville, Kentucky.

== History ==
The church was incorporated under the name Chestnut Street Presbyterian Church on February 25, 1848. In 1875, the church purchased land on the southwest corner of 4th and Broadway and began the construction of a new building. The following year, the church's name was changed to Broadway Tabernacle Presbyterian Church. The name was changed again to Warren Memorial Presbyterian Church in 1882.

Dr. A. B. Simpson pastored the church from 1874 to 1879, and he later founded the Christian and Missionary Alliance.

== Pastors ==
- Leroy Jones Halsey (1849?–1858?)
- Dr. Gilbert H. Robertson (1870–1874)
- Dr. Albert Benjamin Simpson (1874–1879)
