= Francisco Olazábal =

Mexican evangelist (1886–1937)

Francisco Olazábal (October 12, 1886 – June 1, 1937) was a Mexican Pentecostal evangelist, who conducted an evangelistic healing ministry and founded the Interdenominational Mexican Council of Christian Churches in 1923, later renamed as Latin American Council of Christian Churches or Concilio Latino Americano de Iglesias Cristianas (CLADIC). Francisco Olazábal committed 30 years to his evangelistic healing ministry. Olazábal held healing campaigns across the United States, Puerto Rico, and Mexico.

== Early life ==
Olazábal was born on October 12, 1886, in El Venado, Sinaloa, Mexico. His mother, Refugio Velazquez, left Catholicism and converted to Methodism in 1898 in Mazatlán, Mexico. His father, Juan Olazábal, abandoned him and his mother after his mother converted and she became a lay evangelist (SOURCE-lecture notes). Olazabal left his mother in 1902 to travel to San Francisco, California to visit family. At this time Olazábal, through George Montgomery's ministry, rededicated his life to Jesus, and returned to Mexico and to the Methodist Church. In 1911, Francisco Olazábal immigrated to the United States and moved to El Paso, Texas, where he pastored a Spanish-speaking Methodist Church. In 1914, Francisco Olazábal married Macrina Orozco, his childhood sweetheart. Bishop A.W. Leonard ordained Olazábal as a minister in the Methodist Church in 1916. However, Olazábal left the Methodist Church to preach the "full Gospel" after having converted to Pentecostalism under the ministry of George and Carrie Montgomery in 1916. The General Council of the Assemblies of God ordained Olazábal on September 24, 1916. On February 14, 1918, Robert J. Craig laid hands on Olazábal and ordained him to the Assemblies of God.

== Affiliations ==
Aimee Semple McPherson, a famous Pentecostal evangelist and founder of the Foursquare Gospel denomination, referred to Olazábal as the "Mexican Billy Sunday". McPherson invited Olazábal to preach at Bethel Temple. In March 1927 Olazábal and his congregation were invited to attend services at Aimee Semple McPherson's church, Angelus Temple in Los Angeles. McPherson sought to merge her Foursquare Gospel denomination and the Latin American Council of Christian Churches, but the Council rejected her proposition. At this time, McPherson began a Spanish-speaking Foursquare ministry in East Los Angeles. Alice E. Luce-founder of the Latin American Bible Institute and H. C. Ball helped pioneer the Latino Pentecostal movement and influenced Olazábal's ministry. While at Moody Bible Institute in 1911, Olazabal worked under James M. Gray and Reuben A. Torrey. Torrey believed that baptism with the Holy Spirit was a "definite experience" and required for a Christian life, a belief that Olazábal rejected at this time in his life as a Methodist. After a brief stint at Moody, Olazábal would go on to minister at Torrey's Church of the Open Door in Los Angeles. Rev. Homer Tomlinson was Olazábal's good friend and pastor of the Jamaica Tabernacle Church of God.

== Education ==
In San Luis Potosí, Mexico, Olazábal attended Wesleyan School of Theology from 1908 to 1910. In 1911, he attended Moody Bible Institute in Chicago for one semester.

== Ministry ==
Francisco Olazábal committed 30 years to his evangelistic healing ministry. Olazabal held healing campaigns across the United States, Puerto Rico, and Mexico. Before attending Moody, in 1911, Olazábal pastored a Spanish-speaking Methodist congregation in El Paso, Texas. After a semester at Moody Bible Institute, Olazábal followed Reuben A. Torrey to Los Angeles to pastor to the Mexican congregants at Church of the Open Door. After parting ways with Torrey, and Olazabal went on to pastor in Spanish-speaking Methodist Churches in California; for example: the Northern Methodist Episcopal Church in Pasadena, California and the Northern Methodist Episcopal Church in the San Francisco Bay area. Olazábal pastored Mision Mexicana de Pasadena until 1916. In 1920, Olazábal began Buenas Nuevas Mission in El Paso, Texas.

In 1922, Olazábal founded a Bible college in El Paso, Texas. In 1923, Francisco Olazábal formed the Latin American Council of Christian Churches, the first independent Latino Pentecostal denomination in the United States.

In 1929, Olazábal held a healing campaign in Chicago. In 1931, Olazabal's evangelic healing campaign attracted over 100,000 people to Spanish Harlem. Olazábal's services took place at Cavalry Baptist Church in Brooklyn. Olazábal's "Puerto Rico Para Cristo" campaign in 1936 was considered unsuccessful. On September 10, 1936, Olazábal announced his intention to unite with The Church of God, at that time the group under the leadership of A.J. Tomlinson which would later become the Church of God of Prophecy.

== Death ==
On June 1, 1937, Olazábal was critically injured in an automobile accident near Alice Springs, Texas. Olazábal died in the hospital from internal bleeding on June 9, 1937. Francisco Olazábal is buried in Evergreen Cemetery in East Los Angeles.

== See also ==
- List of Mexicans
