= Stephen Bruno =

American memoirist

Stephen Bruno is an American memorist and doorman. His 2024 book, Building Material tells the story of his two-decade career as a doorman on Park Avenue.

Bruno was born and raised in the Bronx to a Puerto Rican and Ecuadorian family. He attended Nyack College before receiving his Bachelor's degree from John Jay and an MFA from Hunter College.
