= Robert Jaffray =

Canadian politician

The Honourable Robert Jaffray
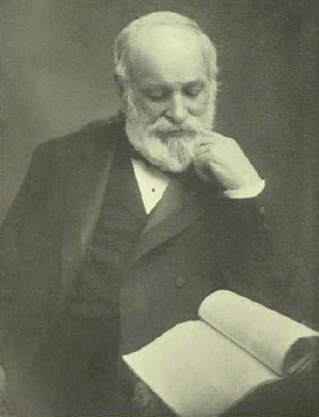

Canadian Senator from Ontario
- In office March 8, 1906 – December 16, 1914
- Appointed by: Wilfrid Laurier

Personal details
- Born: January 23, 1832 Skeoch Farm near Bannockburn, Scotland
- Died: December 16, 1914 (aged 82) Toronto, Ontario, Canada
- Party: Liberal

Robert Jaffray (January 23, 1832 – December 16, 1914) was a Canadian grocer, publisher of The Globe, and politician. A Liberal, he was appointed to the Senate of Canada on 8 March 1906 on the recommendation of Sir Wilfrid Laurier. He represented the senatorial division of Toronto, Ontario until his death. He is buried in Toronto's Mount Pleasant Cemetery.

His son Robert A. Jaffray was a Christian missionary to China who was trained by A.B. Simpson.
