= Salvation Army Vision Network =

US based digital television channel

Salvation Army Vision Network (Savn.tv)
- Website type: Salvation, Christianity
- Owner: The Salvation Army
- Website: www.savn.tv
- Commercial: No
- Registration: Optional
- Launched: September 10, 2011; 15 years ago
- Current status: Active

The Salvation Army Vision Network (aka Savn.tv) is a US-based digital channel endowed by The Salvation Army, a quasi-military fashioned charitable organization founded by William Booth as the East London Christian Mission in 1865. It develops and provides accounts of the Salvation Army through short films, a number of series and documentaries with emphases on inspirational stories, prayers, meditations, and uplifting advice, and broadcasts all of its original content, and acquired content, worldwide online via its website.

== History ==
The Salvation Army's global video initiative Savn.tv was set up in early 2011, and launched in September 2011 by Commissioner Jim Knaggs. It was promoted as a call to action website, involving the Christian community, social activists, and other like-minded people directly online through film and video. The network covers salvation topics, and has online groups and channels to publish content and views.

In 2013, Salvation Army Vision Network partnered with multi-faith media organization, Odyssey Networks to work on a Call on Faith all-video broadcast mobile app. The new channel provides video content from the Savn.tv website. In May 2015, Savn.tv won the 2015 Webby Awards of the International Academy of Digital Arts and Sciences, in the Religion & Spirituality category. The website was designed and built by Reverge
