= Alliance Bible Seminary =

Seminary in Hong Kong

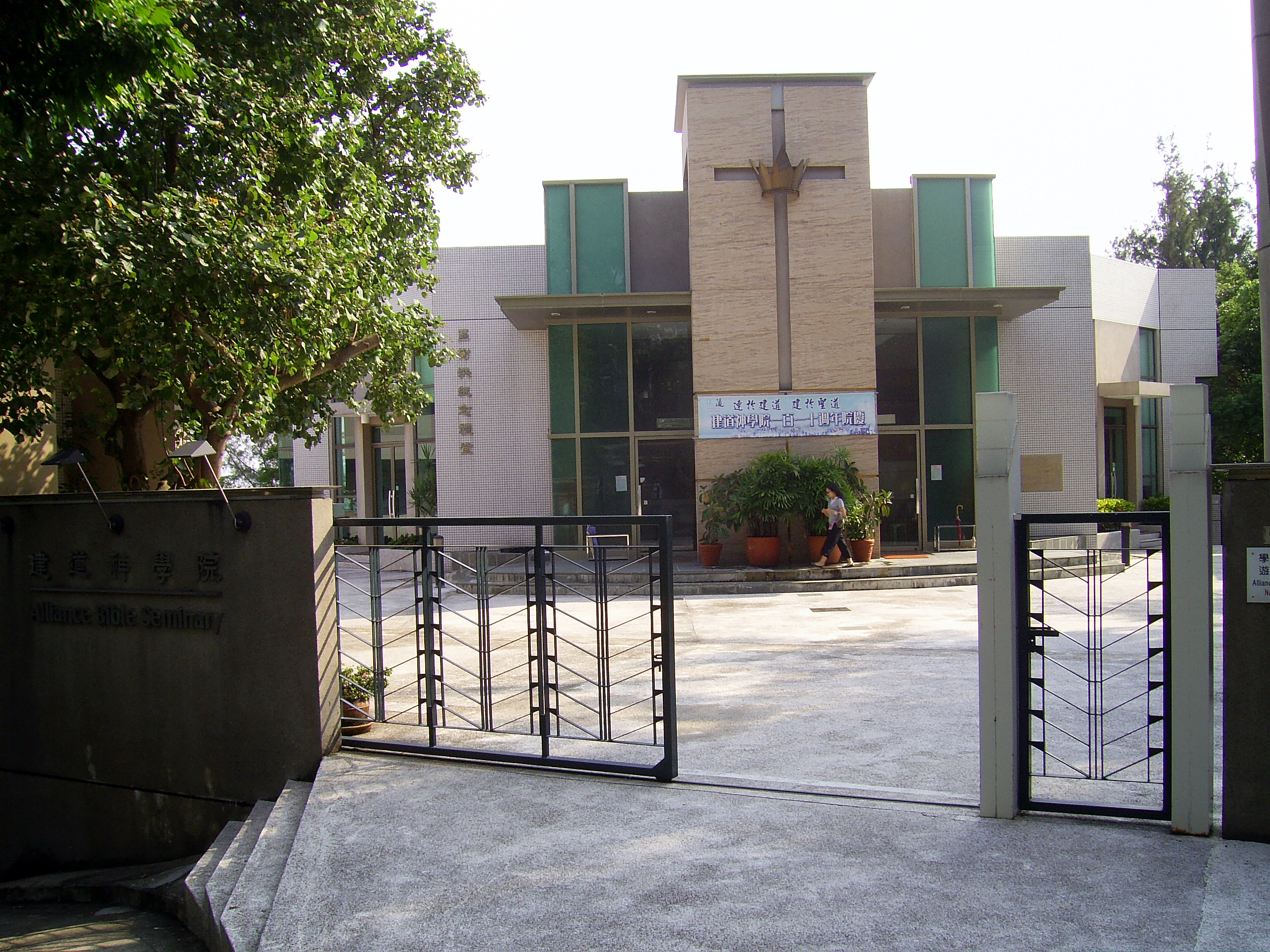
- Former name: Alliance Bible College
- Established: 1899
- Principal: Revd Dr Leung Ka Lun
- Dean: Shikai Ronnie Poon
- Location: Cheung Chau

Alliance Bible Seminary (Abbreviation: ABS; Chinese: 建道神學院), is a C&MA seminary, located in Cheung Chau, Hong Kong. The seminary was originally founded in 1899 in Wuzhou, Guangxi, under the name Alliance Bible College. Established by missionaries Dr. Robert Glover and Robert A. Jaffray, ABS was the first C&MA seminary to be founded overseas, and one of the first seminaries in South China. In 1949, the seminary was moved to Cheung Chau, Hong Kong by Dr. William C. Newbern after the Communist takeover of mainland China. ABS was founded before any church plant and trained many of its students for missionary work. After they graduated, most were sent to establish new churches. Hence, most churches of the Christian and Missionary Alliance in Hong Kong were planted by their graduates.

== History ==
=== The first century: 1899-1999 ===
Alliance Bible Seminary was established in 1899 in Wuzhou, Guangxi Province, China. It was founded by Dr Robert Hall Glover, a medical missionary appointed to China in 1894 by C&MA, together with Robert A. Jaffray, Alvin Field, and Walter H. Oldfield. In 1902, the Seminary established the Alliance Women's College, the first institute of its kind in the Guangxi province. In 1937, these two institutions were merged, and in 1938 renamed as Alliance Bible Institute.

Following the establishment of the People's Republic of China in 1949, Alliance Bible College relocated to Cheung Chau, Hong Kong, where it resumed operations in 1950. The College was renamed as Alliance Bible Seminary in 1955, since in Hong Kong the term "College" is customarily used to refer to secondary schools. In 1958 Alliance Bible Seminary issued its first ever Bachelor's degree.

In 1975 the Christian and Missionary Alliance Mission elected to transfer governorship of Alliance Bible Seminary to local Chinese Christians, under the auspices of the Christian and Missionary Alliance Church Union of Hong Kong. Under this new leadership structure, Dr Philip Teng assumed the responsibility of president of the Seminary, a position that he held for five years, before the inauguration of the second president, Dr James Cheung, in 1980.

During the following decade the ABS significantly increased its graduate provision. In 1983 the Seminary began to offer a Master's degree in Christian Ministry, in 1986 it introduced the Master of Biblical Studies and the Master of Missions and Evangelism programs, and in 1989 the Master of Divinity program was launched. This growth in graduate provision led to the establishment of the Alliance Bible Seminary Graduate School in 1991.

The founding of the Graduate School led to an increase in academic theological and cultural engagement within the Seminary, beginning with the establishment of the Christianity and Chinese Culture Research Centre in the same year, and the inaugural publication of a Biblical studies journal, Jian Dao: A Journal of Bible and Theology, in 1994. In 1996, ABS established the Pastoral Institute, and with it a second journal, The Pastoral Journal.

The Seminary continued to expand its graduate program, with the launching of the Doctor of Ministry degree in 1995, the Master of Theology program in 1996, and the Master of Christian Studies (part-time) in 1997.

=== The 'New Era': 2000-2019 ===
The 'New Era', which began after the celebration of Alliance Bible Seminary's Centennial Anniversary, was marked with the completion and the Centennial Complex in 2000, and the dedication of the Au Shue Hung Memorial Chapel in 2001.

This expansion continued with the purchase of the City Campus site at Wan Chai in 2005, its opening in the following year. Also established in 2005 was the Department of Pastoral and Professional Continuing Education, and the Lay Leadership Training Department. 2005 also saw the inauguration of a new president, Dr Leung Ka-Lun.

In 2008 the Seminary further extended its campus with the opening of both Siu Yee Hall and Timothy Hall. The graduate program also underwent further expansion, with the addition of the Master of Ministry and Doctor of Philosophy programs. In 2010 the Seminary established the School of Pastoral and Professional Continuing Education (SPPCE), before adding a further campus site in Kowloon, Hong Kong, the Alliance Bible Seminary Kowloon Centre.

=== Leadership ===
- William C. Newbern (1950-1969)
- W. Henry Holton (1970-1975)
- Philip Teng (1975-1980)
- James M. Cheung (1980-2001; 2003-2005)
- Gordon Siu (Acting: 2001-2003)
- Leung Ka-lun (2005-2018)
- Kiven Choy (2018-)

== Academics ==
=== Accreditation ===
Alliance Bible Seminary is a certified member of the Asian Theological Association. The Seminary's certificates, bachelor's degree, diploma, master's degrees, and doctoral degrees are all accredited by the Asian Theological Association, and are in accordance with its internationally recognised standards.

Alliance Bible Seminary is also a member of the Hong Kong Theological Education Association, and the Association for Theological Education in South East Asia.

=== Academic programs ===
Students at Alliance Bible Seminary take a variety of academic programs and degrees. The following is a list of the accredited degrees and programs offered by the Alliance Bible Seminary.

- Certificate in Theology
- Certificate in Church Music
- Certificate in Intercultural Studies
- Diploma in Theology
- Diploma in Intercultural Studies
- Diploma in Marriage and Family Therapy
- Bachelor of Theology (Th.B.)
- Master of Christian Ministry
- Master of Christian Studies
- Master of Divinity (M.Div.)
- Master of Divinity – Post BTh
- Master of Theology (Th.M.)
- Doctor of Ministry (D.Min.)

== Campus ==
The main campus of C&MA is located in Cheung Chau, with 100,000 square feet. There are 15 buildings in the campus, including Jaffray Memorial Hall (Library annex), Evans Hall (Student centre), Eva Newbern Hall (Canteen and student dormitory), Siu Yee Hall (Administration office), Wu Mo Tak Memorial Library, Chong Hon Lok Memorial Hall (Lecture hall and dormitory), Au Shue Hung Memorial Chapel as well as other dormitories.

== Academic awards and scholarships ==
Alliance Bible Seminary awards multiple prizes and scholarships to its students, with funds drawn from a number of sponsoring bodies. These bodies include: the Chinese Christian Church, Aize Foundation, Mr Huang Bingqian, Xuanhaohui Xinghua Hall, COCM Christian Overseas Chinese Missionary Society, Gospel Masters Association, Global Bible Society, the Tiandao book Building, the Life and Marriage Enlightenment Training Co., Hong Kong and Kowloon Pei Ling Research and Development Co., Missionary Church Hebron, Missionary Association Hong Kong, Missionary Church North Point, and Jin Balun Presbyterian Church Chau Chau.

The Seminary also offers a number of student awards. Prizes for Excellence in Writing and Excellence in Preaching, named in honour of the acclaimed American theologian and author Frederick Buechner, are annually awarded to students who have demonstrated their skill in these two areas. Among its other awards, both past and present, scholarships such as the Ms. Wen Chen Meiqin Memorial Dcholarship, the Pan Deng Shufen Memorial Scholarship, the ABS Masters Class Award, the ABS Bachelor Class Award, the Huang Xun Memorial Scholarship, the Ms. Lian Meiying Award, the Cai Huifen Alumni Memorial Scholarship, the Tang Shaohong Memorial Scholarship, and the Ms. Zeng Zhuomei Memorial Scholarship.
