= Alliance Theological Seminary =

Evangelical Christian seminary in New York City

- Type: Seminary
- Active: 1882–2023
- Affiliations: Christian and Missionary Alliance
- Location: Manhattan, New York, USA

Alliance Theological Seminary was an evangelical Christian seminary affiliated with the Christian and Missionary Alliance, last located in Manhattan. It operated from 1882 to 2023.

== History ==
The seminary had roots from the Missionary Training Institute, a school established by A.B. Simpson to train missionaries for world service in 1882. Simpson originally opened the Missionary Training Institute in Times Square, New York in 1883; in 1898 it moved a few miles away to South Nyack. The school eventually became Nyack College, and the seminary stemmed out of its graduate program, founded in 1960 as the Jaffray School of Missions. In 1974, the program was redesigned and subsequently renamed to the Alliance School of Theology and Missions.

It took its current name in 1979, and in addition to the main campus in Nyack, there was a large satellite campus located in Manhattan, and an extension in Puerto Rico. The 2012 enrollment was approximately 800 students.

In 2019, Nyack College closed Alliance Theological Seminary in Rockland County and moved all operations to the Manhattan campus. After changing its name to Alliance University, the college closed on August 31, 2023 after years of financial struggles.

== Programs ==
The seminary was accredited from 1990 to October 2023 by the Commission on Accrediting of the Association of Theological Schools in the United States and Canada, at which point it voluntarily relinquished accreditation.

The seminary offered a variety of graduate degrees including an MA in intercultural studies or biblical literature, as well as MPS, MDiv, and DMin degrees.

== See also ==
- Alliance University
- Christian and Missionary Alliance
- List of defunct colleges and universities in New York
