= Mark Putnam =

Mark L. Putnam
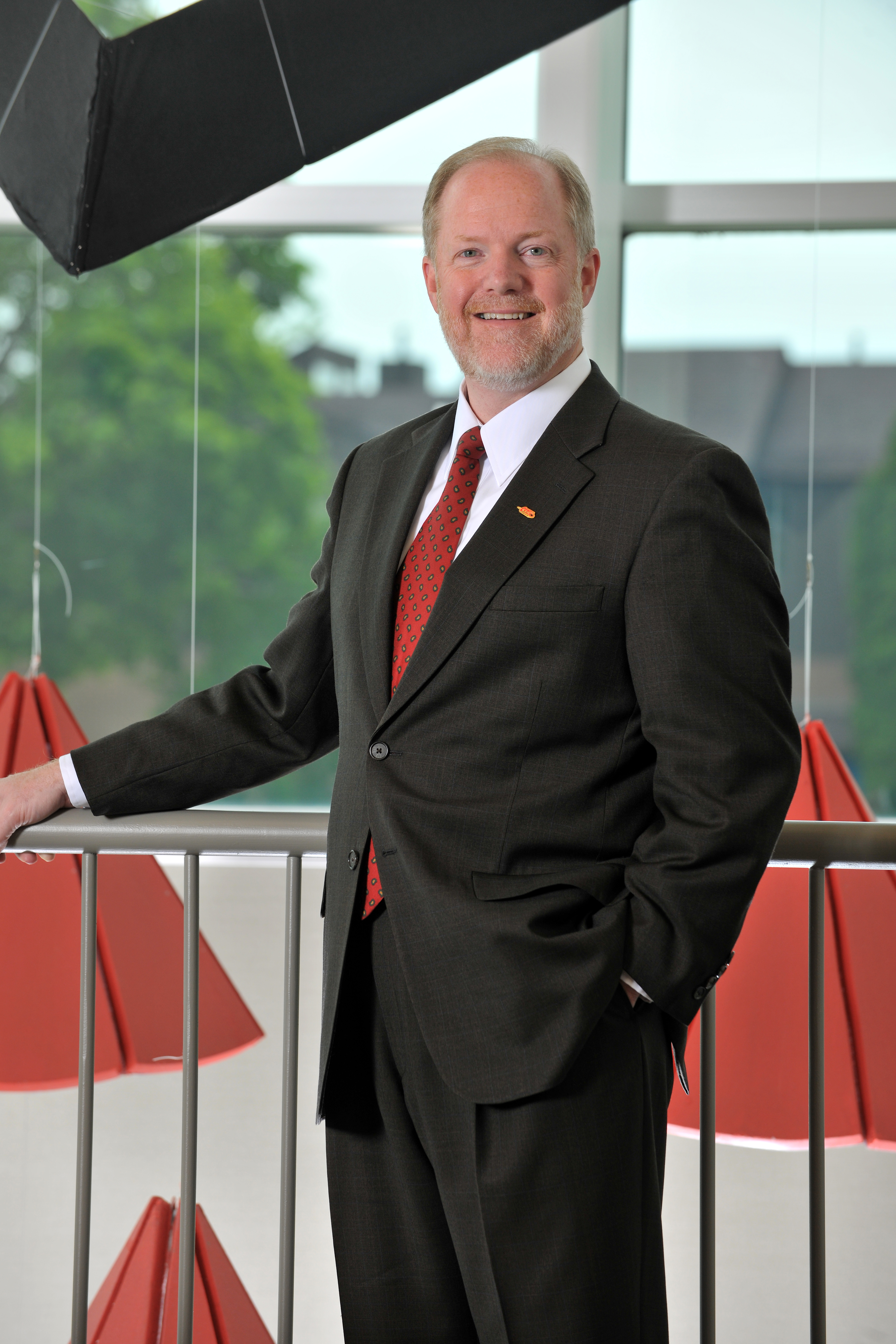

21st President of Central College
- Incumbent
- Assumed office July 1, 2010
- Preceded by: David H. Roe

Personal details
- Children: 2
- Education: Nyack College (BA); Columbia University (MA, MEd, EdD)

Mark Putnam is an American academic administrator serving as the 21st president of Central College, a liberal arts college located in Pella, Iowa. He was appointed to the role July 1, 2010,

== Early life and education ==
Putnam was raised in Endicott, New York. He earned a Bachelor of Arts in philosophy from Nyack College. He then earned a Master of Education Master of Arts, and Doctor of Education from Teachers College, Columbia University.

== Career ==
Prior to his presidency appointment at Central College, Putnam served as senior vice president for executive affairs, chief of staff and chief planning officer at Northeastern University, where he held a succession of leadership roles over 10 years. He also held senior administrative appointments and positions at Connecticut College, Alliance Theological Seminary, Nyack College, and Pace University. He began his career in higher education as an admission counselor at Nyack College in 1983.

In 2010, Putnam was invited to participate in roundtable discussions in Washington, D.C., with the United States Department of Education, the Association of American Colleges and Universities and Global Perspective Institute Inc. Additionally, he accepted an invitation to participate in the Higher Education Working Group on Global Issues for the Council on Foreign Relations.

== Personal life ==
He and his wife Tammy live in Pella. They have two daughters.
