= Alliance University (New York City) =

Christian college in New York City

- Former names: Nyack College (1972–2022); Missionary Training Institute (1882–1972)
- Type: Private university
- Active: 1882–August 31, 2023
- Religious affiliation: Christian and Missionary Alliance
- Academic affiliations: CCCU; CIC
- President: Rajan S. Mathews
- Location: New York City, U.S. 40.7056°N 74.0156°W
- Campus: Urban
- Colors: Dark Purple and Alliance Red
- Sporting affiliations: NCAA Division II – CACC (North)
- Mascot: Warriors
- Website: www.allianceu.edu
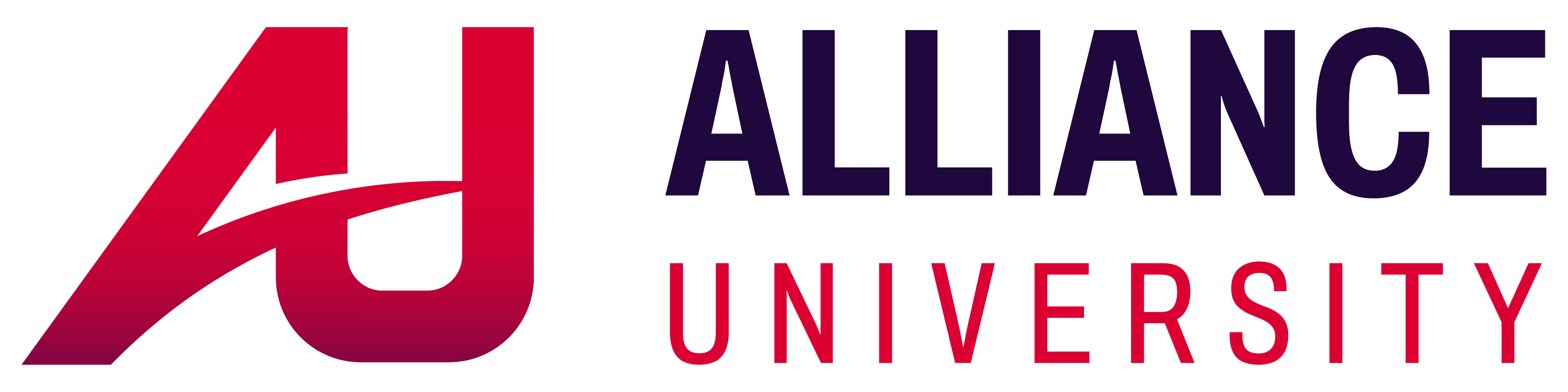

Alliance University (formerly Nyack College (/ˈnaɪ.æk/) was a private Christian university affiliated with the Christian and Missionary Alliance and located in New York City. It offered undergraduate and graduate programs; in addition, it included Alliance Theological Seminary.

In June 2023, the Middle States Commission on Higher Education announced that it would revoke the university's accreditation in December 2023 due to significant and ongoing financial challenges. On June 30, 2023, university leaders announced that it would cease operations as of August 31, 2023.

== History ==
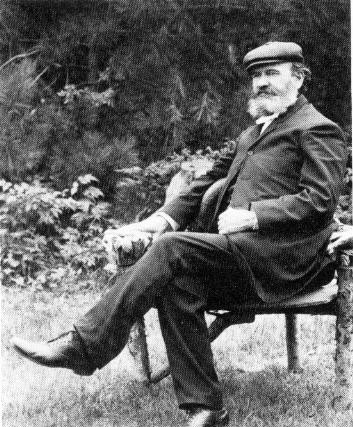
A. B. Simpson, founder of Nyack College and the Christian and Missionary Alliance

Originally known as the Missionary Training Institute, the school was founded in 1882 in New York City by Dr. A. B. Simpson. Simpson resigned from a prestigious New York City pastorate to develop an interdenominational fellowship devoted to serving unreached people. Simpson's view was shared by many of his contemporaries, including mainline church leaders, laborers, and theological scholars.

After more than a decade of nomadic address changes for the Institute—including Eighth Avenue and 44th Street in Manhattan—28 acres of land were purchased in Rockland County, New York, and, in 1897, the school relocated to the village of South Nyack becoming widely known as a Bible college and an institute for ministry preparation.

The Missionary Training Institute was later granted a charter by the New York Board of Regents and the school's curriculum was registered by the State Education Department in 1944. In 1953, the school was authorized to confer the Bachelor of Science degree and, in 1961, the Bachelor of Arts degree. In 1960, the corporation was authorized to conduct a post-baccalaureate program as the forerunner of the Alliance Theological Seminary. Nyack first received accreditation in 1962 from the Middle States Association of Colleges and Schools.

The seminary was established in 1960 as the Jaffray School of Missions, a graduate program of the college. The Jaffray School of Missions emphasized the interdisciplinary encounter between theology and the social sciences. In 1974, the Jaffray program was redesigned to include the preparation of students for ministry in North America and abroad. The name of the seminary was subsequently changed to the Alliance School of Theology and Missions. In September 1979, the Alliance School of Theology and Missions became Alliance Theological Seminary, which is recognized by the Christian and Missionary Alliance as the denomination's official seminary in the United States.

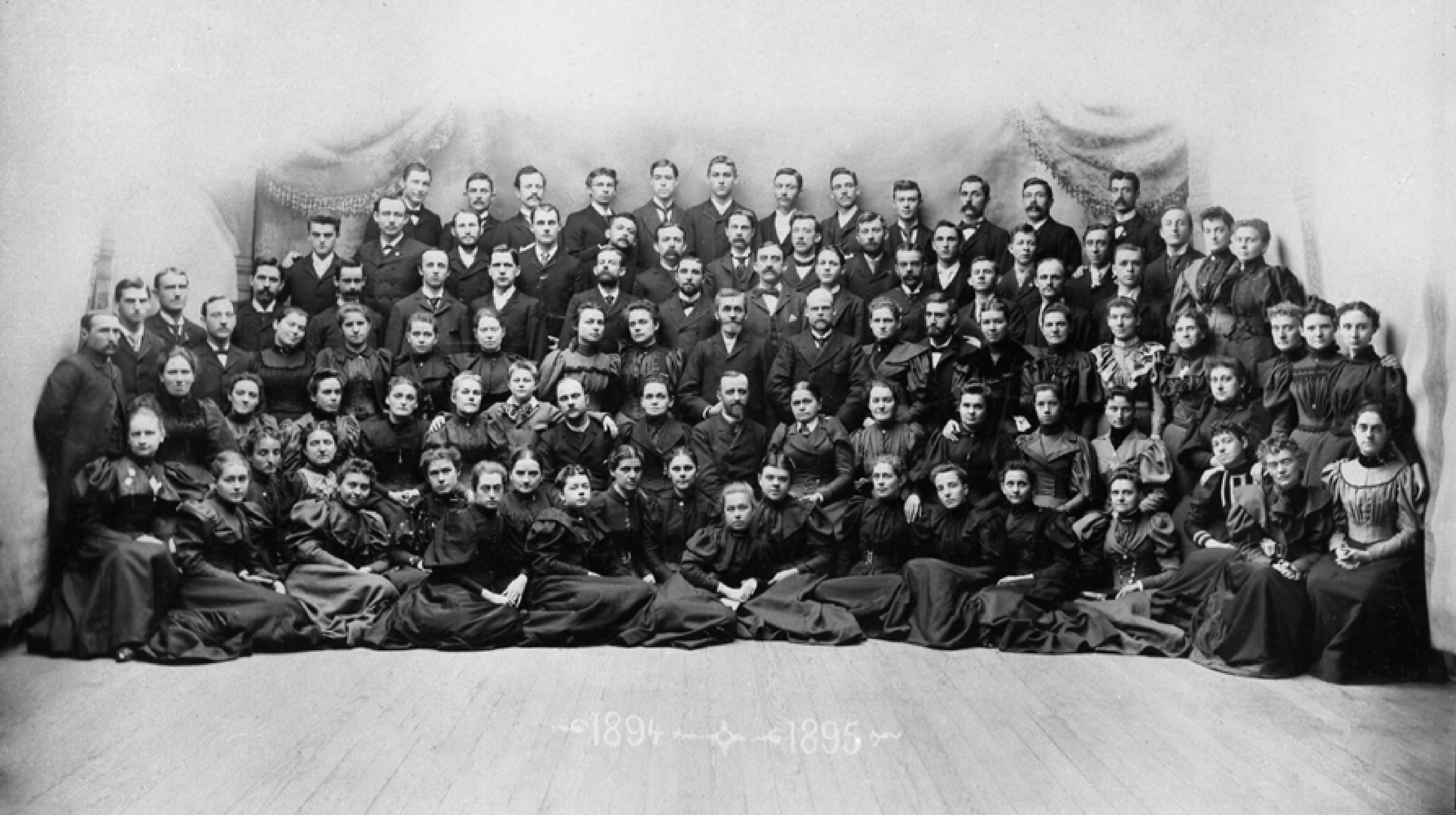
The students of 1894–95 (when Nyack College was called the Missionary Training Institute)

The school changed its name to Nyack College in 1972 and began offering professional degree programs like education and business in the early 1970s.

In 1997, the college returned to Manhattan with a branch campus. Steady growth in enrollment prompted a search in 2008 for a new permanent home for the New York City campus, an initiative that became known as The Miracle in Manhattan. In 2012, Nyack College and Alliance Theological Seminary signed a 20-year lease with a two-year option to purchase the 166,385 sq ft (15,457.7 m^{2}) on eight floors of the structure at 2 Washington Street in Battery Park. Classes began in the new facility in fall 2013.

On November 7, 2018, the college announced plans to close its Nyack campus and consolidate its New York operations in its Manhattan-based campus by fall 2019. The Nyack campus was scheduled to close at the end of the 2018–2019 academic year; however, the closure was delayed to September 2020. After the sale of the Nyack campus, the college was renamed Alliance University in September 2022.

The Nyack property was sold to and is operated by Yeshiva Viztnitz Dkhal Torath Chaim.

In June 2023, Middle States Commission on Higher Education announced that it would revoke the University's main accreditation in December 2023 due to the university's significant and ongoing financial challenges. On June 30, 2023, the university announced that it would cease operations as of August 31, 2023. At the time of the closure, the denomination said it was exploring ways to continue the seminary program.

== Academics ==
In spring 2013, Alliance University graduated its first nursing degree students.

Through a collaboration with Hudson Link for Higher Education in Prison, Alliance University provided a Bachelor of Science program in organizational management to incarcerated individuals at Fishkill Correctional Facility in Beacon, New York and at Sing Sing Correctional Facility in Ossining, New York. In 2015, the school graduated 24 inmates. With the closure of Alliance, Bard College, through their Bard Prison Initiative, began accepting incarcerated Alliance students as transfer students.

=== Accreditation ===
Alliance University was accredited by the Middle States Commission on Higher Education. In March 2023, the accreditor placed the university on "show cause" status due to significant and ongoing financial struggles. Three months later, the accreditor announced its decision to revoke the university's accreditation in December 2023.

== Reputation and rankings ==
- In 2016, U.S. News & World Report ranked Nyack College as one of the 10 most diverse colleges in the northern region of the United States.
- In 2015, The Chronicle of Higher Education named Nyack College a "Great College to Work For" for the fifth consecutive year. The college received high marks in the areas of work/life balance, respect and appreciation, compensation and benefits, and diversity.
- In 2016, the inaugural Wall Street Journal/Times Higher Education College Rankings named Nyack College among the top 20 schools in the nation assessed for campus environment. According to the October 28, 2016, article, the campus environment category evaluates "the racial and ethnic diversity of students and faculty, the number of international students enrolled and the inclusion of students from lower-income and first-generation college families." In addition, Nyack was recognized for being among "the top multicultural schools in the Northeast" region of the United States.

== Notable alumni ==
- Kurtis Blow, rapper
- Cynthia Davis, politician
- Seth Galloway, soccer player
- Maryanne J. George, Christian musician
- Donald J. Harlin, United States Air Force general
- Karl Hood, Grenadian politician
- Rashida Jolley, harpist
- James Knaggs, American Salvation Army officer
- Mark Putnam, college president
- Father John Misty, musician

== See also ==
- List of defunct colleges and universities in New York
