= Hotlines =

- Genre: Reality Television
- Written by: Scott Gurney; Matt Pizzolo
- Presented by: Deirdre Delaney; Scott Gurney; Stacy Kamano; Ivana Bozilovic; Tracy Kay; Bonnie-Jill Laflin
- Country of origin: United States
- Original language: English

Production
- Production company: FM Productions

Original release
- Network: Spike TV
- Release: September 1, 2003 – September 1, 2004

Hotlines is an American reality television series about adventures in exotic, fun hotspots. The series was hosted by Deirdre Delaney, Scott Gurney, Ivana Bozilovic and Stacy Kamano, the first two of whom were also its producers. In each episode, the hosts would be shown engaging in various outdoor activities such as scuba diving, sky diving and jungle walks. Intercut with the footage, two or more of the female hosts would occasionally talk to the camera, explaining how exciting, scary or fun a particular situation had been. Hotlines was originally shown on Spike TV from 2003 to 2004.
