= Mary Gay Humphreys =

American author

- Born: 1843; Ripley, Ohio
- Died: 1915 (aged 71–72)
- Other names: Henry Somerville; Elinor Gray

Mary Gay Humphreys (1843 - 1915) was an American journalist and author. She is best known for her writings in multiple news outlets, and her books including one on Catherine Schuyler, a socialite in Colonial America.

== Life ==
She was born in Ripley, Ohio in 1843 to William Smith Humphreys and Henrietta Somerville Write and died in 1915. She served as a nurse in the Civil War and the Philippines.

== Writings ==
Humphreys wrote in multiple periodicals including The Art Amateur, Scribner's Sons, Harper's Bazaar, Harper's Weekly, The Evening Sun, and The Chicago Inter-Ocean. In 1885, she co-authored, using the pen name Elinor Gray, a book with American Christian author, William Boardman. The book was called Skilful Susy: A Book of Fairs and Bazars, and it reviewed ouvrages de dames, fancy work, and other craft-work required in an 18th century household. Her next book, Catherine Schuyler, was a biography of Catherine Van Rensselaer Schuyler who was born in colonial New York to a prominent Dutch family and provides insight into the daily toils of upper-class 18th century women.

Humphreys then used the nom-de-plume, Henry Somerville, for her next two books. When Jack Racer was first published, the news described the author Henry Somerville as a native of Ohio who worked in the newspaper business and who had been encouraged by his mother to write fiction. Later it was revealed that Somerville was the nom-de-plume of Humphreys. Humphreys went on to publish a sequel, Racer of Illinois, in 1902.

Her final book, Missionary Explorers Among the American Indians, was included as a volume in Scribner's in 1913. The article was devoted to the lives of six American missionaries: John Eliot, Samson Occum, David Brainerd, Marcus Whitman, Stephen Riggs and John Lewis Dyer.

== Selected publications ==
- Humphreys, Mary Gay (1885). "Skilful Susy. A book of fairs and bazars". Library of Congress. OCLC 1157217061.
- Humphreys, Mary Gay; Woodrow Wilson Collection (Library of Congress) (1897). Catherine Schuyler. New York: C. Scribner's Sons. OCLC 1861828.
- Humphreys, Mary Gay (1901). Jack Racer. Written as Henry Somerville. McClure, Phillips & Co. OCLC 25959199.
- Humphreys, Mary Gay; McClure, Phillips & Co (1902). Racer of Illinois. New York: McClure, Phillips & Co. OCLC 669223104.
- Humphreys, Mary Gay (1913). Missionary explorers among the American Indians. New York, N.Y.: C. Scribner's Sons. OCLC 1526495.
