= Alliance Graduate School =

Graduate school

Coordinates: 14.656°N 121.024°E

- Former names: Alliance Graduate School of Theology and Missions; Alliance Biblical Seminary
- Motto: Rooted in the Word, Ministry to the World.
- Established: 1977
- Affiliations: Christian and Missionary Alliance Churches of the Philippines
- President: Dr. Joel A. Caperig
- Location: Quezon City, Philippines
- Website: ags.edu.ph

The Alliance Graduate School (AGS) is an inter-denominational Evangelical Christian graduate school of theology, missions, biblical studies, pastoral studies, and counseling in Quezon City, Philippines, housed together with AGS College of Ministry (formerly Philippine Alliance College of Theology (PACT)). It was established in 1977. It is affiliated with the Christian and Missionary Alliance Churches of the Philippines.

== History ==
In 1966, leaders of The Christian and Missionary Alliance Churches of the Philippines, Inc. (CAMACOP) and the Philippine Mission of The Christian and Missionary Alliance (C&MA) recognized the need for theological training on the graduate level and began to plan for the future. At that time, Ebenezer Bible College was the denomination's only major leadership development center.

1970s: foundation years
In June 1977, under the leadership of Dr. Metosalem Q. Castillo, the Alliance Graduate School of Theology and Missions (AGSTM) was founded. The fledgling institution shared the Ebenezer campus in Zamboanga City. Dr. Castillo served as the president for the first five years and gave direction to the program, focusing on missions and church growth.

1980s: years of identity-building
In 1982 the seminary moved to Quezon City in Metro Manila and changed its name to the Alliance Biblical Seminary (ABS). This transfer reflected an increased desire and vision for supporting denominational goals directed toward the needs of urban centers in the Philippines and across Asia. The Alliance saw Manila as an ideal location for the school.

But the dream was much more than a new location. Academic programs were needed that would extend beyond missions and church growth to include an emphasis on biblical, theological, and pastoral ministry studies. In response to the need to deepen and broaden the scope of theological education and ministry skills, ABS developed a regular three-year professional Master of Divinity (M.Div.) course with concentrations in Missions, Pastoral Studies and Christian Education.

With the 1982 move, the late Rev. Valmike B. Apuzen, Sr. assumed the position of president. During its initial years in Manila, the seminary was located in rented facilities of BBB in Quezon City, but in 1984, permanent site for the growing school was secured with the purchase of a large house in the quiet neighborhood of Veterans Village in Proj. 7. Dr. Rodrigo D. Tano served as president from 1984 to 1997.

1990s: years of expansion
In 1993, during Dr. Tano's watch, a two-year program in Christian Counseling – the first in the Philippines – was started. The increasing number of students enrolled in the program attests to the need to prepare "people-helping" ministries within and outside the local church.

In 1996, a Master of Christian Studies (M.C.S.) program was added to the curriculum in response to the needs of those involved in lay and focused para-church ministries. In 1997, the Youth Ministry graduate programs began, another first for the Philippines and Asia. In response to the need to train church workers for ministry with the poor and enable the church to address poverty, injustice, and environmental issues, ABS introduced the Community Development Program. This program was offered in partnership with the Asian School of Development and Cross-Cultural Studies (ASDECS) training consortium. The Applied Linguistics Program began in 2000 after ABS and the Translator's Association of the Philippines (TAP) signed a memorandum of agreement to offer a joint training program for Bible translators. Beginning with the school year 2002-03, this program also provides translation and linguistics training in Asia for the summer Institute of Linguistics and Wycliffe Bible Translators.

The programs were run in partnerships with either institutions or persons or both. They were offered without the substantial market analyses as required by CHED. These analyses are important as variables therein provide the reasons for sustainability.

The Faculty-Staff Retreat in February 1999 was the beginning of what became commonly known as the ABS process. This process, with the mission statement "Advancing, building, and strengthening ABS for the 21st century", was a comprehensive process of institutional renewal and strategic planning. It culminated in the ABS Retreat 2000 where 51 participants from ABS dreamed about and planned for the future of ABS. The ABS process resulted in a strategic plan for the next five years. This strategic plan included action plans for a comprehensive curriculum revision and development, and for restructuring the school into a team-based organization with shared leadership.

The curriculum development process resulted in a new curriculum with several integrating themes across programs, a strong intent to balance academic scholarship and professional training for ministry skills, an improved field education program, and a new philosophy. Existing programs were restructured, and several new ones added such as the Marriage and Family Ministries, Academic Research and Educational Ministries for the school context. The Missions Program started developing a sub-track for Muslim ministries. The Distance and Extension Learning Program (DELP), initiated with small beginnings, was also started.

2000s:'
In 2003, Dr. Jonathan V. Exiomo was appointed president by the board of trustees.

In November 2004, the name ABS was changed to Alliance Graduate School to avoid risking the lives and ministries of alumni working in limited access nations.

In 2006, AGS ventured into innovative programs by initially offering a Master of Ministry (M.Min.) in pastoral leadership in response to pastors' and church leaders' desire to do graduate level studies without leaving home and work.

Today, the M.Min. Pastoral Leadership provides a growth opportunity among denominations leaders and like-minded Christian organizations at the key centers in the Philippines.

== Academic programs ==
Master of Divinity (in) (M.Div.)

Biblical studies
Theological studies
Pastoral studies
Youth studies
Missiology

- Christian education with concentrations in:

Christian education
Christian counseling
Academic and research ministries

- Missiology (inter-cultural studies)

Missiology

Community development

Master of Arts (M.A.)

Biblical studies
Pastoral studies
Theological studies
Youth studies
Marriage and family studies

- Christian education with concentrations in:

Christian education
Christian counseling
Educational ministries

- Missiology

Missiology
Community development
Biblical studies

Distance and Extension Learning Program [DELP]

- Master of Christian Studies

Innovative programs

- Master of Ministry

Graduate Certificate

== Accreditations ==
AGS is fully recognized by the Commission on Higher Education (CHED) as a Higher Education Institution, and is accredited by the Asia Theological Association and the Association for Theological Education in South East Asia. AGS is also a partner institution of the Asia Graduate School of Theology. Its current president is Jonathan V. Exiomo (2003–present).
