= Scott Gurney =

American actor

- Born: 1972 (age 53–54)
- Occupations: Executive producer, television, film actor, model
- Spouse: Deirdre Gurney

Scott Gurney (born 1972) is an American executive producer, writer, director, actor, model, and entrepreneur who has created several television series documentaries and unscripted/reality TV programming, including the highly rated Duck Dynasty, Auction Hunters, Haunted Collector, Feeding Frenzy, Leah Remini: It's All Relative and American Guns. Gurney is also well known for producing several Shark Week specials for Discovery Channel including Killer Sharks: The Attacks of Black December, How Sharks Hunt, Shark City, Shark Attack Survival Guide, and Great White Appetite.

Scott began modeling for catalog retailer International Male in San Diego, and then went to Los Angeles and modeled for Calvin Klein and Polo Sport. In Los Angeles, he began taking acting classes and auditioning.

In 2001, he landed a role in The Fluffer and was praised for his performance by The New York Times. He has appeared on the television shows 7th Heaven, Baywatch, Cybill, Step by Step, Push, Married... with Children, Beverly Hills 90210, Buffy the Vampire Slayer and Saved by the Bell: The New Class. He has also appeared in several NBC movies of the week and was the host of the reality television series Hotlines.

He started a production company, Gurney Productions, Inc. with his wife Deirdre, a former lawyer. Gurney Productions has produced over 60 television shows to date. The company's programs have appeared on over a dozen different networks since 2004.

Scott and Deirdre Gurney were given an undisclosed but large settlement after a two-year legal battle with ITV, an integrated producer-broadcaster (IPB) based in London, England, which creates, owns and distributes high-quality content on multiple platforms globally.

== Selected filmography as an actor ==
Year	Title	Role	Notes
1995	Saved by the Bell: The New Class	Jeff	
1996	Married... with Children	Lifeguard	
1996	Malibu Shores	Mat	
1996	She Cried No		
1997	Steel Chariots	Brett Tucker	
1998	Push	Tyler Mifflin	
1998-1999	Baywatch	Petty Officer Nick Montgomery	
2001	The Fluffer	Mikey Rossini (aka Johnny Rebel)	
