= Philippine Student Alliance Lay Movement =

The PSALM logo.

The Philippine Student Alliance Lay Movement Inc. (Abbreviated P.S.A.L.M) is an organized para-church ministry incorporated under the Christian and Missionary Alliance Churches of the Philippines, Inc. It is an interdenominational campus ministry that provides evangelistic programs and enhances leadership skills among young people.

== History ==
PSALM began as College Youth Center (CYC), founded by Dr. Joseph Arthur on August 8, 1969, in Zamboanga City, Philippines.

Later on February 22, 1977, the ministry became a movement and was incorporated under the name Philippine Student Alliance Lay Movement, Inc. (PSALM).

As of 2009, PSALM has 21 recognized districts all over the Philippines.

== See also ==
- Alliance Youth Philippines
- CAMACOP
