= Dorothea Trudel =

Swiss faith healer (1813–1862)

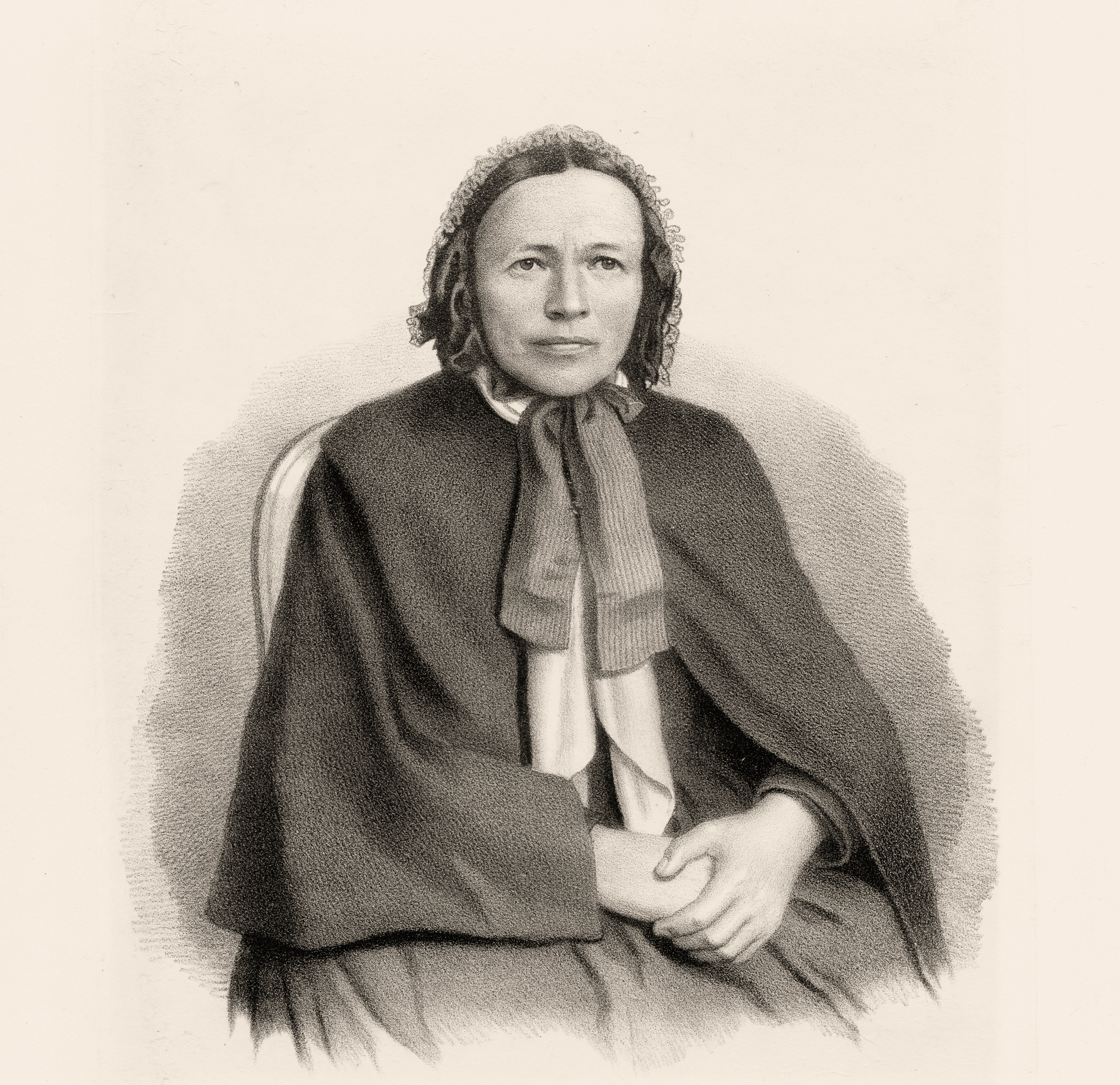
Dorothea Trudel, Männedorf

Dorothea Trudel (27 October 1813 – 6 September 1862) was a Swiss woman who was involved in faith healing. She built several houses in Männedorf where she took in the sick. Together with Johann Christoph Blumhardt, she was one of the forerunners of the Divine Healing Movement.

== Biography ==
Trudel was born in Uezikon, a hamlet near Hombrechtikon in the canton of Zürich. Her family lived in poor circumstances and she was only able to attend school for four years. She initially earned her living by weaving silk. She was confirmed as a member of the Reformed Church of the Canton of Zurich. Her mother strongly influenced her spiritual life and her piety can be attributed to pietism within the Reformed Church. Her mother told of numerous answers to prayer, which Trudel recorded in the tract "A Mother".

Trudel moved to Männedorf with her uncle Doctor Trudel in 1844 and became acquainted with Moravian piety. From 1850, she worked in her nephew's factory. After four workers fell ill and the doctor's medication did not help, Trudel laid hands on them in accordance with James 5 and all four of them recovered, according to her.

In November 1852, Trudel moved back to her uncle's house. She made visits to the mentally ill and began to hold edification meetings in the house and children's classes. From 1854, sick people were sent to her and she took them in. Many of them were mentally ill. She read the Bible with them, had pastoral conversations and laid hands on them. The demand was so great that she bought further houses in 1857 and 1859. Trudel had to stand trial for practising medicine without a license. However, it was proved that she did not practise medicine, but only religion. The trial therefore ended with an acquittal. She testified in court that over 300 people had been healed. She was able to provide written testimonies from 90 people. Trudel died of typhoid fever in 1862. As early as 1860, Trudel called the young teacher Samuel Zeller into her ministry. He continued it after her death.

== Spirituality ==
Trudel's spirituality was strongly influenced by her mother. Her spiritual influence can be attributed to Pietism within the Reformed Church. Trudel also internalized elements of Herrnhut piety, in particular the Daily Watchwords. She greatly appreciated the sermon book by the Württemberg revivalist preacher Ludwig Hofacker (1798–1828). Reading the Bible and prayer were very important to Trudel. A special feature of her spirituality was prayer and anointing according to James 5.

== Reception ==
Trudel became internationally known. Following her example, healing houses were established by Henriette von Seckendorff in Cannstatt (Germany), the Graf couple in Geneva, Otto Stockmayer in Hauptwil (Switzerland) and the Rämismühle asylum (Switzerland). Charles Cullis in Boston in particular was significantly influenced by Dorothea Trudel. Through his work, numerous Healing Homes were established in the USA.
