= Charles Cullis =

Episcopalian physician involved with Holiness movement

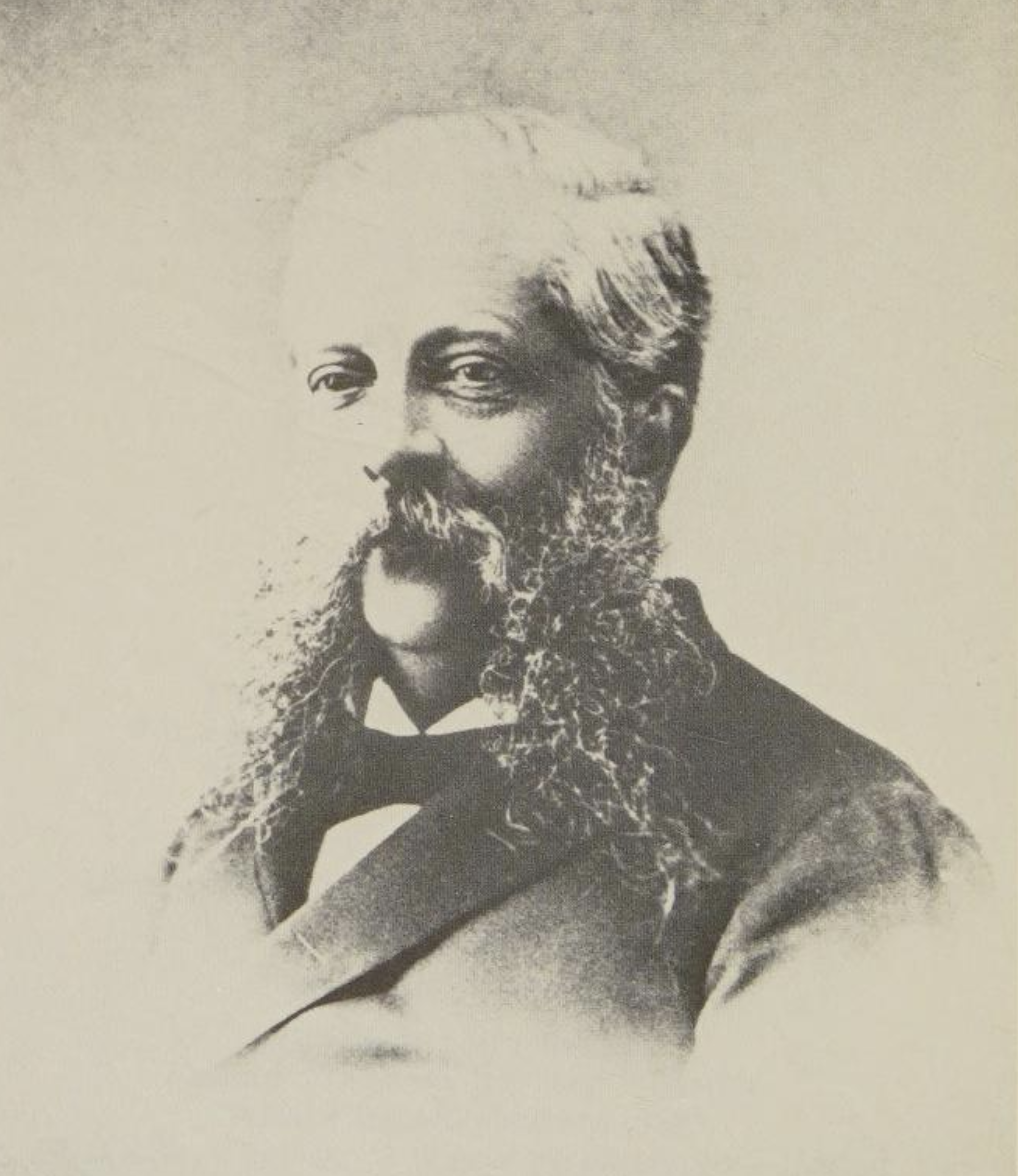
Charles Cullis

Charles Cullis (7 March 1833 - 18 June 1892) was an Episcopalian physician based in Boston, Massachusetts. He became known for his involvement in the Holiness movement.

== Biography ==
Cullis was born in Boston, Massachusetts on March 7, 1833. He suffered from ill health, and although this meant that he was sometimes not able to attend school, he studied medicine at home and graduated from the University of Vermont at age 24.

It was common practice at the time to turn away incurable cases such as tuberculosis from hospitals, so Cullis opened four homes between 1864 and 1869 to house tuberculosis patients, he also started homes for orphans, caregivers, and cancer patients. In addition, Cullis started a training school for deaconesses, a faith cure school, various missions, and a publishing house.

He was involved with the Holiness movement and influenced the movement to have a greater emphases on healing. Cullis was influenced by Dorothea Trudel's healing ministry. He was a leading figure in the faith cure movement along with other preachers such as William E. Boardman and Albert B. Simpson. He held revival meetings in New Hampshire and Maine every year.

He helped encourage rest homes for the sick and homeless, and about twenty-five such homes connected with the Holiness Movement had been started by 1887. At the height of his ministry he authored a number of books on healing.
