= Beulah Heights, California =

Human settlement in Oakland, California, United States of America

Coordinates: 37.788°N 122.186°W

Beulah Heights, formerly known as Beulah, is a former settlement in Alameda County, California now annexed to Oakland since 1909. It was located 2 miles (3.2 km) northwest of Mills College.

A post office operated at Beulah Heights from 1907 to 1911. One of the most notable buildings in the former settlement was the Home for Aged and Infirm Colored People of California which was a racially segregated nursing home designed by local civic and religious leaders within the African American community in 1897 to provide care for their elderly and homeless, who were otherwise ineligible to enroll in the other nearby retirement homes based on their race.
