= Home for Aged and Infirm Colored People of California =

Home for elderly in Oakland, US (1892–1938)

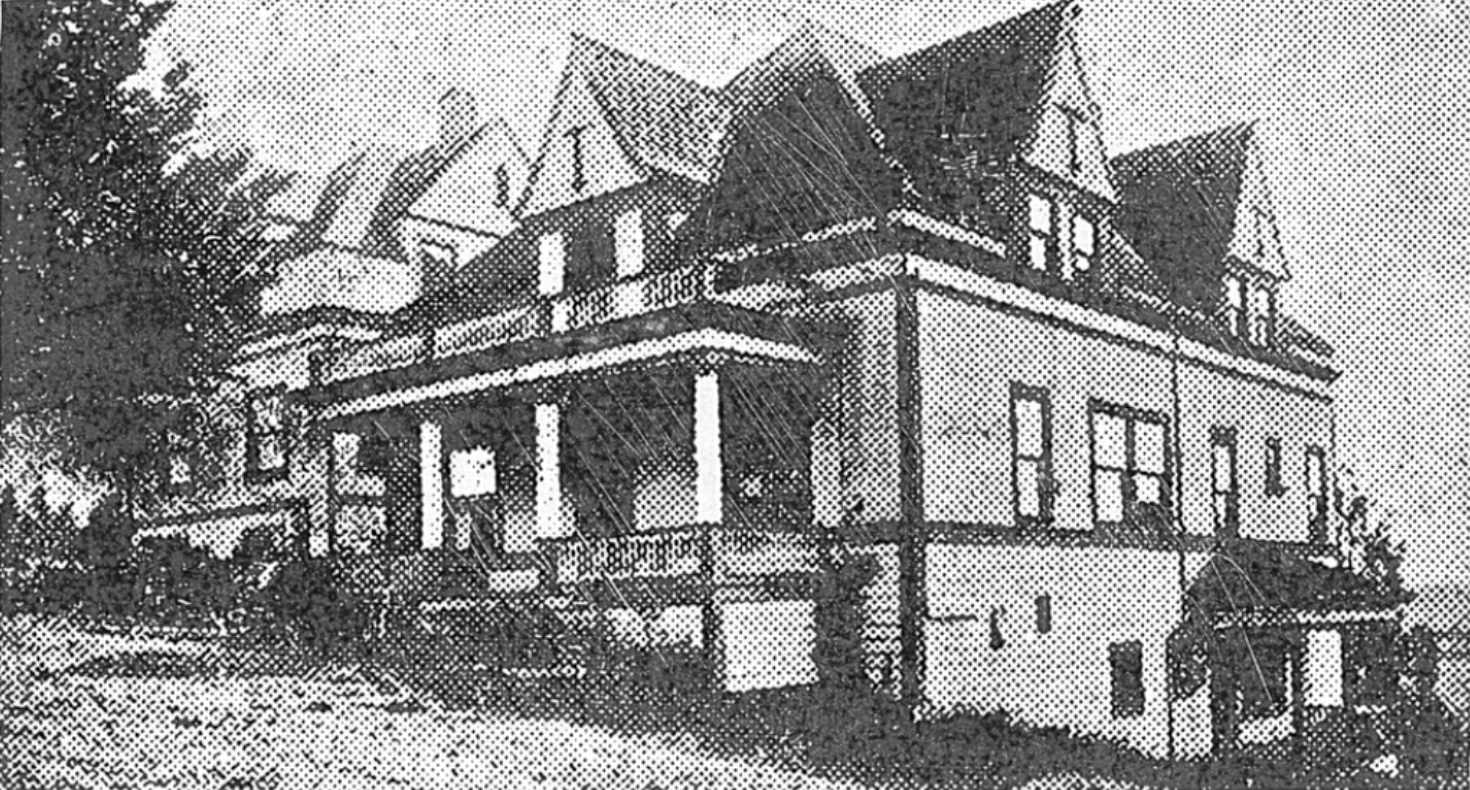

Geography
- Location: 5245 Underwood Ave., Beulah, California, U.S. (now Oakland)
- Coordinates: 37.781853°N 122.186601°W

Organisation
- Funding: Private
- Type: Elderly

History
- Former names: Beulah Home, Beulah Home for Aged and Infirmed Colored People
- Opened: September 26, 1892

The Home for Aged and Infirm Colored People of California (1892–1938) was an institution for elderly African Americans in Beulah, California (now Oakland). It was the first of its kind in the state, and provided care for those who were otherwise ineligible to enroll in the other nearby care homes based on their race. It was also known as the Beulah Home.

== History ==
The Home for Aged and Infirm Colored People of California was founded on September 26, 1892, by Elenora Amos, Mary E.A. Cole, Mary Goodman, Mary J. Humphrey, Rosa H. Lockett, Ann S. Purnell, Harriet E. Smith, Areminto Stanford, Mary C. Washington, Ellen Whiting, and Anna Williams.

The land for the home was located on a site at the border of Mills College (now Mills College at Northeastern University), and was donated by Christian missionaries, George S. Montgomery and Carrie Judd Montgomery from the Salvation Home of Peace. The two story Victorian building was designed by architect D.F. Oliver, and held sixteen rooms.

It operated as a community chest, through the local African American community's donations. They would sponsor donation days, dances, and dinners for fundraising.

The first president was Julie A. Shorey, the wife of William T. Shorey, who served for ten years. She was succeeded as president by Elizabeth Brown.

The pioneering African American miner Alvin Aaron Coffey Sr. was an early resident, and he died at this institution in 1902. In 1909, the city of Buelah was annexed into the city of Oakland.

== Closure ==
The Department of Social Services in 1937, informed the institute that their permitting license was put on hold due to concerns about the financial condition. It was also suggested by the Oakland Fire Marshall in 1937, that the institute was a dangerous fire hazard and needed to either fire proof the existing structure, or move.

The property was purchased in 1938 by Mills College, and the building was demolished in 1939.

== See also ==
- African Americans in the East Bay (San Francisco Bay Area)
