= Higher Life movement =

Christian movement emphasizing a form of entire sanctification

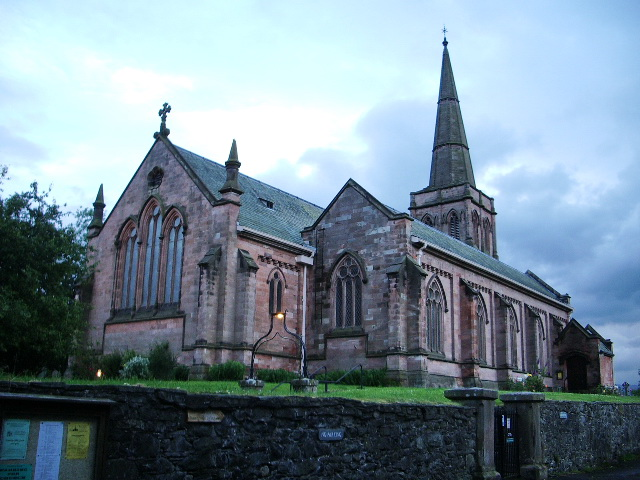
The Christian theological tradition of Keswickianism historically became popularized through the Keswick Conventions, the first of which was a tent revival in 1875 at Saint John's Church in Keswick, England.

The Higher Life movement, also known as deeper Christian life, the Keswick movement, or Keswickianism (/ˌkɛzɪˈkiənɪzəm/ KEZ-i-KEE-ə-niz-əm), is a Protestant theological tradition within Evangelical Christianity that espoused a distinct teaching on the doctrines of entire sanctification, healing, and spiritual gifts.

Its name comes from the Higher Christian Life, a book by William Boardman published in 1858, as well as from the town in which the movement was first promoted—Keswick Conventions in Keswick, England, the first of which was a tent revival in 1875 and continues to this day.

The main idea in the Keswickian theology of the Higher Life movement (also known as deeper Christian life) is that the Christian should move on from his initial conversion experience to also experience a second work of God in his life. This work of God is called "entire sanctification," "the second blessing,” “the second touch," "being filled with the Holy Spirit," and various other terms. Believers are encouraged to "let go and let God" in order to receive this. Higher Life teachers promote the idea that Christians who receive this blessing from God can live a more holy—that is, a less sinful, or even a sinless—life. The Keswick approach seeks to provide a mediating and biblically balanced solution to the problem of subnormal Christian experience. The “official” teaching has been that every believer in this life is left with the natural proclivity to sin and will do so without the countervailing influence of the Holy Spirit.

The Higher Life movement developed among Evangelical Anglicans and British conservative Evangelicals; it has spread throughout the United Kingdom and across the former colonies of the British Empire since the late 19th century. With the rise of the Higher Life movement, Christian denominations largely accepting a form of Keswickian theology with unique distinctives, such as the Christian and Missionary Alliance, were founded. The Keswickian view of sanctification became normative in "American Evangelicalism of a more Calvinistic bent ... except confessional Reformed and Lutheran".

== History ==
The Higher Life movement was precipitated by the related but separate Wesleyan-Holiness movement, which had been gradually springing up, but made a definite appearance in the mid-1830s. It was at this time that Methodists in the northeastern United States began to preach Wesleyan doctrine of Christian perfection or entire sanctification and non-Methodists at Oberlin College in Ohio began to accept and promote their own version of sanctification, with Charles Finney of Oberlin teaching that his doctrine was distinctly different from the Wesleyan one to which Asa Mahan was more attracted. The American holiness movement began to spread to England in the 1840s and 1850s. Methodist evangelist James Caughey, as well as Presbyterian Asa Mahan and Presbyterian-turned-Congregationalist Charles Finney began to teach the concept to churches in England and then in Ireland and Scotland.

Soon after these initial infusions of holiness ideas, Walter Palmer and his wife Phoebe Palmer of New York City went to England in the 1850s and 1860s to promote them. They were banned from ministering in Wesleyan churches, even though they were promoting Wesleyan doctrines and were themselves Methodist. During their time in England, many people experienced initial conversion, and many more who were already converted believed that they had received entire sanctification. Robert and Hannah Smith were among those who took the holiness message to England, and their ministries helped lay the foundation for the now-famous Keswick Convention, which differs from traditional Wesleyan-Holiness theology.

In the 1870s, William Boardman, author of The Higher Christian Life, began his own evangelistic campaign in England, bringing with him Robert Pearsall Smith and his wife, Hannah Whitall Smith, to help spread the holiness message.

On May 1, 1873, William Haslam introduced Robert Pearsall Smith to a small meeting of Anglican clergymen held at Curzon Chapel, Mayfair, London.

The first large-scale Higher Life meetings took place from July 17–23, 1874, at the Broadlands estate of Lord and Lady Mount Temple, where the Higher Life was expounded in connection with spiritualism and Quaker teachings. The meetings were held primarily for Christian students at Cambridge University. At the end of these meetings, Arthur Blackwood, president of the Church Missionary Society, suggested that another series of meetings for the promotion of holiness be conducted at Oxford later that summer.

A convention for the promotion of holiness was held at Brighton from May 29-June 7, 1875. The American evangelist Dwight L. Moody told his London audiences that the Brighton meeting was to be a very important one. About eight thousand people attended it. T. D. Harford-Battersby attended this convention and made arrangements to have one in his parish in Keswick. He was the recognized leader of this annual convention for several years until his death. Robert Pearsall Smith was going to be the main speaker, but the public disclosure of his teaching a woman in a hotel bedroom that Spirit baptism was allegedly accompanied with sexual thrills led him to be disinvited from the meeting. Smith never recovered and having "lost his faith, withdrew from public gaze and spent most of the rest of his life as an invalid".

A gradual distinction developed between traditional Methodists and the newer Keswick speakers. Keswick took on a more Calvinistic tone, as Keswick preachers took pains to distance themselves from the Wesleyan doctrine of eradication (the doctrine that original sin could be completely extinguished from the Christian soul prior to death). Keswick speakers began using the term "counteraction" to describe the Holy Spirit's effect on original sin, often comparing it to how air pressure counteracts gravity in lifting an airplane. Modern Wesleyan-Arminian theologians regard the Keswick theology as different from their own dogma of entire sanctification. Keswickians and Methodists differ on their view of sin, with Methodists viewing "sin as a voluntary transgression of the known law of God" and Kewsickians viewing "sin as any attitidue or action that falls short of the perfection of God." Keswickians and Methodists differ in that Keswickians do "not believe that the sin nature can be eradicated, but can only be suppressed" while Methodists affirm "the removal of the sin nature" in entire sanctification.

Harford-Battersby organized and led the first Keswick Convention in 1875 at Saint John's Church in Keswick, which gave the name to the Keswickian theological tradition. Over four hundred people met under the banner of “All One in Christ Jesus.” British speakers included Anglicans, such as the J. W. Webb-Peploe, Evan H. Hopkins, and Handley Moule, as well as Frederick Brotherton Meyer, a Baptist, and Robert Wilson, a Friend. An annual convention has met in Keswick ever since and has had worldwide influence on Christianity.

Columbia Bible College and Seminary (now Columbia International University) was founded by one of the early leaders of the American Keswick movement, Robert C. McQuilkin. His son, Robertson McQuilkin, contributed the Keswick chapter to the book "Five Views of Sanctification."

Albert Benjamin Simpson, largely accepting a form of Keswickian theology with his own distinctives, founded the Christian and Missionary Alliance denomination in 1897. Albert Benjamin Simpson departed from traditional Keswickian beliefs, however, in his view of progressive sanctification and rejection of suppressionism. It emphasizes the role of Jesus Christ as Saviour, Sanctifier, Healer and Coming King.

In the 19th and 20th centuries, D. L. Moody, Hannah Whitall Smith, and R. A. Torrey preached Keswickian theology. It was a strong influence on E. J. H. Nash, who founded the influential Iwerne camps in the UK and cited Torrey as his theological mentor.

== Critiques ==
Denominations aligned with the Keswickian higher life movement, such as the Christian and Missionary Alliance, differ from the Wesleyan-Holiness movement in that the Keswickian higher life movement does not see entire sanctification as cleansing one from original sin, whereas adherents in churches espousing Wesleyan-Arminian theology affirm this teaching of John Wesley. While Wesleyan-Holiness theology is taught in the Methodist tradition that is inherently Arminian, Keswickian theology flourishes among evangelicals of a Calvinist bent.

However, Keswick doctrine has been sharply criticized as a disguised form of entire sanctification (or "perfectionism") by other Christian traditions, particularly historical Calvinism and Presbyterianism. Princeton theologian B.B. Warfield wrote a trenchant attack on the Keswick and Higher Life movement in his two-volume work Studies in Perfectionism, specifically in his articles "The Higher Life Movement" and "The Victorious Life." W. H. Griffith Thomas responded to Warfield and defended the Higher Life movement in two articles in the journal Bibliotheca Sacra. Another early opponent of Keswick was J. C. Ryle, who set forth the classic Protestant doctrine of sanctification in his book Holiness as an alternative to Keswick. More modern defenders of Keswick theology include J. Robertson McQuilkin in the book Five Views of Sanctification, as well as John R. VanGelderen. Modern Reformed criticism of Keswick has come from J. I. Packer, as well as from Andrew Naselli, who critiqued Keswick in his doctoral dissertation on the subject. Charismatic and Pentecostal authors may critique the Higher Life movement also as not going far enough, but Pentecostal scholars recognize and appreciate the groundwork laid by Higher Life advocacy of the continuation of the gifts of healing and miracle-working for the rise of the Pentecostal movement.

== See also ==
- Cambridge Inter-Collegiate Christian Union which can (in part) trace its beginnings to the meetings at Broadlands in 1874.
- Quietism which through T. C. Upham's biography (1854) of Madame Guyon was a significant influence on holiness-oriented circles in the second half of the nineteenth century.
- Finished Work Pentecostalism was considerably influenced by Keswickian theology.
- Richmond J M, (2015). Nine Letters from an Artist The Families of William Gillard, Porphyrogenitus. ISBN 978-1-871328-19-6

== Sources ==
- Althouse, Peter, “Wesleyan and Reformed Impulses in the Keswick and Pentecostal Movements." Pneuma Foundation.
- Bundy, David D., Keswick: a Bibliographic Introduction to the Higher Life Movements (Wilmore, KY: First Fruits Press, 2012)
- Cloud, David, "Hannah Whitall Smith, The Popular Heretic [and Higher Life founder]"
- Gleason, Randall, B. B. Warfield and Lewis S. Chafer on Sanctification. Journal of the Evangelical Theological Society 40/2 (June 1997) 241–258
- Harford, C. F., ed. The Keswick Convention; its Message, its Method and its Men, London, 1907.
- Harford-Battersby, T. D. Memoirs of the Keswick Convention, 1890.
- Hopkins, E. H., The Story of Keswick, London, 1892.
- Naselli, Andrew, "Let Go and Let God? A Survey and Analysis of Keswick Theology." (Bellingham, WA: Lexham Press, 2013)
- Packer, J. I., Keep In Step With The Spirit, 1984, ISBN 0-8010-6558-5. — See chapter 4.
- Pierson, A. T., The Keswick Movement, New York.
- Pollock, J. C., A Cambridge Movement, London, John Murray, 1953.
- Pyne, Robert A., and Matt Blackmon, "A Critique of the Exchanged Life", 2006 Bibliotheca Sacra 163, April–June
- Robertson McQuilkin, The Keswick View: Five Views of Sanctification, ISBN 0-310-21269-3 Zondervan Pub.
- *Ross, Thomas, The Doctrine of Sanctification: An Exegetical Examination, with Application, in Biblical, Historic Baptist Perspective. Ph. D. diss., Great Plains Baptist Divinity School, 2016
- Sawyer, James M,, "Wesleyan and Keswick Models of Sanctification."
- Warfield, Benjamin B., Studies in Perfectionism, vol. 1 & 2 in vol. 7-8 of Works of Warfield, Philadelphia, 1958, ISBN 0-87552-528-8.
