= Full Gospel =

Evangelical doctrine

The Full Gospel or Fourfold Gospel is an evangelical doctrine that summarizes the Gospel in four aspects, namely the salvation, sanctification, faith healing and Second Coming of Christ. It has been used in various Christian traditions, including Keswickian, Pentecostal, Anabaptist, and Baptist denominations.

== History and usage ==
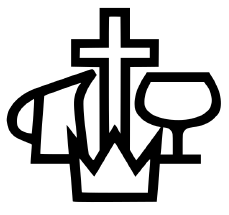
Alliance World Fellowship logo representing the four aspects of the Gospel

This term has its origin in 1887 in a series of sermons called "Fourfold Gospel" by the Canadian pastor Albert Benjamin Simpson, founder of the Alliance World Fellowship, a denomination that teaches a form of Keswickian theology. According to him, this concept represents the four aspects of the ministry of Jesus Christ; Christ the Savior, Sanctifier, Healer, and King who will soon return.

Foursquare Church logo representing the four aspects of the Gospel

In October 1922, the Canadian evangelist Aimee Semple McPherson, founder of Foursquare Church, used the expression "Foursquare Gospel" referring to the doctrine in a sermon in Oakland, California, and stated that it would be the center of her teaching. According to her, this concept represented the four aspects of the ministry of Jesus Christ; Savior, Baptizer with the Holy Ghost, Healer, and King. Various other Pentecostal denominations have been influenced by this doctrine, which is sometimes known as the "Full Gospel". A variety of Pentecostals have further developed the motif of the full gospel, predominantly the five-fold theme of salvation, sanctification, Spirit baptism, divine healing, and the coming kingdom.

The Missionary Church, an Anabaptist denomination with Radical Pietist and Wesleyan influences, holds a commitment to "A. B. Simpson’s fourfold emphasis on Jesus Christ as Savior, Sanctifier, Healer and Coming King".

== See also ==
- Full Gospel Baptist Church Fellowship
- Full Gospel Business Men's Fellowship International
- Christian and Missionary Alliance
- Assemblies of God
- Foursquare Church
- Spiritual healing
