= Whitmore Knaggs =

American fighter, linguist and spy (born c1763)

Whitmore Knaggs was a fighter, linguist and spy.

== Biography ==
Knagg's parents were George Knaggs, who had been born in London, England, and Rachel Sly, who had Dutch parentage. One of at least eight children, he was born in about 1763 on his father's farm by the Maumee River in Ohio. He was educated at home, being taught French, Latin, and Dutch by his mother.

Knaggs was friendly with the local Native American people, and was appointed a United States Indian agent in 1781. In July 1784 the headman of the Ottawa nation granted him a tract of land on the Maumee River on which Fort Miami was later built.

On August 20, 1794, he fought with General Anthony Wayne at the Battle of Fallen Timbers against a mixed Canadian and Native American force. He also acted as interpreter.

He moved to Detroit, where his father had opened a trading store, and in 1797, married Josette Labadie. In 1803 he bought a homestead and farm on the Detroit River by Knaggs Creek (now disappeared, the site was about two blocks west of where West Grand Boulevard meets the Detroit River), where he raised five children, and built a windmill. It became a stopping point for the Ottawa, Chippewa, Pottawatomi and Wabash tribes. Whitmore Knaggs could converse in all these languages.

He was a personal friend of the Indian leader Tecumseh (who was later killed by James Knaggs). In 1805 he was made a captain in the Michigan Militia, and fought against the British and the Indians in the War of 1812, from 1812 to 1815. He was present at the Surrender of Detroit and was taken prisoner by the British, but later released. Later captured by the Shawnee chief George Blue Jacket, he was saved from death by the Wyandot chief, Jack Brandy.

After the war he resumed his duties as Indian agent and interpreter, being a signatory to Treaties at Detroit (1807), Brownstown (1808), Maumee (1817), St Mary's, Ohio (1818), Saginaw (1819).

== Sources ==
A full history of Whitmore Knaggs, his family and descendants is told in History of the Knaggs Family of Ohio and Michigan by Robert B Ross, Detroit, 1902.
