= Latin American Bible Institute, California =

Latin American Bible College, (LABI) California
- Motto: Equipping the next generation of Latino leaders.
- Type: Private
- Established: Established in 1926, LABI College is one of the oldest Hispanic Bible Colleges in the country.
- Affiliations: Assemblies of God USA
- President: Dr. Marty Harris
- Faculty: 22
- Administrative staff: 15
- Students: 92
- Location: La Puente, CA, USA; 34°1′53″N 117°59′21″W
- Campus: Urban 3.3 acres (1.3 ha)
- Colors: Maroon Gold
- Mascot: Lion
- Website: www.labi.edu

LABI College, California (Latin American Bible Institute) is private coed Bible college in the Avocado Heights district of La Puente, California. It was founded in 1926. In 1950 the institute moved to its current location in La Puente. LABI College is one of the oldest Hispanic Bible Colleges in the country.

== History ==
LABI College holds a distinct place in history as one of the United States' oldest educational institutions dedicated to serving the Hispanic community. Its origins can be traced back to an important moment on October 1, 1926, when Miss Alice E. Luce, a former Anglican missionary, partnered with Ralph and Richard Williams to establish the Latin American Bible Institute. This endeavor was carried out in collaboration with what was then known as the Glad Tidings Bible Institute.

Miss Luce's unwavering commitment to creating a Bible school specifically tailored to the Hispanic community has been a driving force behind LABI-CA's ongoing success. During a period of remarkable expansion, the institution underwent two relocations. In 1935, it made the transition from San Diego to the neighboring town of La Mesa, California. Subsequently, in 1941, LABI relocated once more, this time to Los Angeles, in response to the growing number of students seeking ministerial training.

With an increasing number of students and limited space, the necessity for more extensive facilities became evident. The institute took action by acquiring land in La Puente, California, which is the current site of its campus. By the year 1950, LABI College proudly celebrated the graduation of its inaugural class at this new location, marking a significant milestone in the institution's history.

== Academic and Accreditation ==
Since 2020, LABI College has been accredited by the Commission on Accreditation of the Association for Biblical Higher Education (ABHE).

Since 2020, LABI College has been authorized by the U.S. Department of Education to offer Federal Financial Aid (Title IV).

Since 2018, LABI College has approval to operate by the State of California, Bureau of Private Postsecondary Education (BPPE).

The institute was granted an exception to Title IX in 2016 which allows it to legally discriminate against LGBT students for religious reasons. It is ranked among the "Absolute Worst Campuses for LGBTQ Youth" by Campus Pride.

Since 2015, LABI has been fully endorsed by the Alliance of Higher Education. The Alliance is a consortium of accredited bible colleges and universities that are affiliated with the Assemblies of God.

== Organization and Administration ==
Alice E. Luce, LABI College's founder, established the institution. Subsequently, Simon Franco assumed the presidency, becoming the college's first Hispanic president. The administration of LABI College was a collaborative effort involving Alice Luce and H.C. Ball. This is supported by references in two books: Gaston Espinosa's "Latino Pentecostals in America" and Arlene Sanchez Walsh's "Latino Pentecostal Identity." These publications emphasize H.C. Ball's pivotal role in the early development of the Assemblies of God Latino movement and bible schools.

Presidents of LABI College:

Dr. Marty Harris (2014-current)

Dr. John Perea (interim)

Dr. Tommy Casarez (2010-2014)

Dr. Sergio Navarrete (interim)

Dr. Victor M. Mendez (2006-2009)

Dr. Isaac Canales (2000-2006)

Dr. Simon Melendres (1988-2000)

Dr. David Guajardo (1982-1987)

Dr. Victor De Leon (1980-1982)

Dr. Jesse Miranda (1979-1980)

Dr. Joel Torres (1967-1978)

Dr. Theodore Bueno (1952-1967)

Rev. Simon Franco (1939-1951)

== Centers ==
Dr. Grace Women’s Leadership Institute

Dr. Isaac Canales Preaching Center

Hispanic Institute of Pentecostal Studies

== Campus ==
LABI College is located in La Puente California, located in Los Angeles County.
