= William Boardman =

American pastor and teacher (1810–1886)

William Edwin Boardman
- Born: October 11, 1810; Smithboro, New York, U.S.
- Died: February 4, 1886 (aged 75); London, England, U.K.
- Occupations: Pastor, teacher, author
- Notable work: The Higher Christian Life (1858)
- Movement: Higher Life movement
- Spouse: Mary Adams (m. 1837)
- Parent(s): Isaac Smith Boardman and Abigail Saltmarsh Boardman

William Edwin Boardman (October 11, 1810 – February 4, 1886) was an American pastor, teacher, and author. His 1858 book, The Higher Christian Life, was a major international success and helped ignite the Higher Life movement. Boardman's work attracted international attention, especially in England, where Boardman exercised great influence during 1873–1874.

== Life ==
Boardman was born in 1810 to Isaac Smith and Abigail Saltmarsh Boardman. In his youth he had religious training and had a knowledge of the gospel. He married Mary Adams in 1837.

In 1858 he published the first edition of The Higher Christian Life. Elizabeth Baxter reported that reading "Gladness in Jesus" in 1873 had caused her to re-evaluate her beliefs and to trust more in God. Baxter was to found the Bethshan mission, which was a base for healing by prayer. She would say that Boardman was the founder of the mission, but others see Baxter as the driving spirit.

In 1885, he co-authored a book called Skilful Susy: A Book of Fairs and Bazars, with American author and journalist Mary Gay Humphreys.

Dwight L. Moody and Ira Sankey led evangelistic campaigns and Boardman was speaking throughout England on Holiness and the Higher Life. This led to the establishing of the Keswick Conventions.

Boardman also came to be a leader in the ministry of spiritual healing, and he had inspired the Bethshan Healing Home in London.

In 1885, he organized the International Convention of Holiness and Divine Healing in London, and invited the Canadian pastor A.B. Simpson to be one of the speakers. This conference is regarded by many as a turning point in the origins of the modern Pentecostal movement.

Boardman's ministry would continue until his death on February 4, 1886, in London. The Bethshan mission continued and Baxter visited the Indian mission twice after his death.

== Works ==
- The Higher Christian Life, Boston: Henry Hoyt (1858)
- He That Overcomenth: or the Conquering Gospel, London: James Nisbet & Co. (1869)
- Gladness in Jesus
- Faith Work under Dr Cullis, in Boston 1873 (biography of Charles Cullis)
- In The Power Of The Spirit, or, Christian experience in the light of the Bible 1875
- The Great Physician (Jehovah Rophi) 1881
