= James Knaggs =

James M. Knaggs
- Commissioner James Knaggs
- Born: December 5, 1950 (age 74); United States
- Education: MPS in Urban Ministries, Alliance Theological Seminary, February 20, 1995
- Occupation: Officer of The Salvation Army
- Years active: 41 (1976 - 2017 )
- Title: Commissioner
- Spouse: Carolyn Knaggs
- Website: TCSpeak

Commissioner James M. Knaggs (born December 5, 1950) was the Territorial Commander of The Salvation Army, USA Western Territory.

== Officership ==
Date of Commissioning: December 6, 1976
Session Name: The Overcomers

James Knaggs was commissioned as a Salvation Army Officer in 1976, in the USA Eastern Territory. Following a brief appointment at Eastern Pennsylvania and Delaware Divisional Headquarters, he became a Corps Officer with his wife Carolyn.

Following seven years as Corps leaders James and Carolyn were appointed to the Greater New York Division where as Captains, they were appointed as Divisional Youth Secretary and Divisional Corps Cadet Counsellor respectively.

In 1987 James and Carolyn were appointed to the Youth Department at Territorial Headquarters. In 1989 they returned to the Eastern Pennsylvania and Delaware Division where James became the Divisional Secretary and Divisional Men's Fellowship Secretary and Carolyn was appointed as Divisional League of Mercy Secretary.

Following three years at the Divisional Headquarters (DHQ), James was appointed as Territorial Youth Secretary in 1992 and then in 1994 he became Territorial Evangelism and Corps Growth Secretary. During this time, his wife Carolyn had the positions of Territorial Corps Cadets and Junior Soldiers Bureau Director and Territorial Stewardship Bureau Director.

In 1996, as Majors, James became General Secretary for Field Operations at Greater New York Division and Carolyn was appointed as Divisional Director of Volunteers and Current Issues Secretary with additional chaplaincy responsibilities.

As Lieut-Colonels, in 1999, James and Carolyn became the leaders of the Eastern Pennsylvania and Delaware Division as Divisional Commander and Associate Divisional Commander.

Appointments for James and Carolyn (now Colonels) as Territorial Secretary for Personnel and Territorial League of Mercy Secretary in 2000 were soon followed in 2003 with appointments to Chief Secretary and Territorial Secretary for Women's Ministries; Fellowship of the Silver Star in the USA Eastern Territory.

In June 2006 James and Carolyn were promoted to the rank of Commissioner and appointed as Territorial Commander and Territorial President of Women's Ministries in the Australia Southern Territory.

Jim was innovative in his approach to leadership and communication in the Southern Territory, establishing a large followership on his blog, Twitter and Facebook accounts. Among several significant initiatives was his ambitious "210 in 2010" appeal, whose principal aim was to increase the number of Corps and Mission Centres in the territory dramatically.

History has shown us and our conviction remains, that starting new corps or local centers for mission is the most effective means of fulfilling the great commission and bringing people to Jesus. Our campaign is called 210 in 2010. By the end of next year we want to have 210 corps.

In July 2010 James and Carolyn began their new appointments as Territorial Commander and Territorial President of Women's Ministries in the USA Western Territory.

On July 29, 2013 James was called to London, UK with other members of The Salvation Army's High Council to elect the next General as worldwide leader of that organization. James was one of six men nominated, one declined to be placed on the ballots. That body elected Andre Cox to be General.

== Appointments ==
Appointment	Territory	Start Date
Cadet SFOT Suffern NY	USA Eastern	September 4, 1974
Summer Assignment; Philadelphia PA, DHQ	USA Eastern	June 11, 1975
Returned to SFOT Suffern NY	USA Eastern	September 3, 1975
Special Services; Philadelphia PA, DHQ	USA Eastern	June 12, 1976
Corps Officer; Philadelphia (Germantown) PA	USA Eastern	September 8, 1976
Corps Officer; Wilkes-Barre PA	USA Eastern	August 27, 1980
Divisional Youth Secretary; New York NY, DHQ	USA Eastern	June 29, 1983
Assistant Territorial Youth Secretary	USA Eastern	January 28, 1987
Staff Band and Male Chorus, THQ	USA Eastern	January 28, 1987
Div. Sec. & Men's Fellowship Sec.; Phila PA, DHQ	USA Eastern	June 28, 1989
Territorial Youth Secretary, THQ	USA Eastern	July 1, 1992
Secretary Designate; Evang & Corps Growth Dept, THQ	USA Eastern	June 29, 1994
Secretary; Evangelism & Corps Growth Dept, THQ	USA Eastern	August 1, 1994
General Sec. for Field Operations GNY, DHQ	USA Eastern	August 28, 1996
Added Responsibility - Men's Fellowship Sec. GNY, DHQ	USA Eastern	July 1, 1998
Divisional Commander; Philadelphia PA, DHQ	USA Eastern	January 1, 1999
Territorial Secretary for Personnel, THQ	USA Eastern	September 1, 2000
Chief Secretary; THQ	USA Eastern	April 1, 2003
Territorial Commander	Australia Southern	January 8, 2006
Territorial Commander	USA Western	July 1, 2010

== Education / Qualifications ==
- Master of Professional Studies in Urban Ministries, Alliance Theological Seminary, February 20, 1995

== Previous Occupations ==
- Project Coordinator - Education for Parenting

== Personal life ==
Of James and Carolyn, The Salvation Army Australia Southern Territory's Archives and Heritage Museum writes:

Growing up with Salvationists parents The Salvation Army has always been their place of worship. They have a deep love for Jesus and are extremely grateful for the example shown them by their parents and faithful local officers.

They continually desire to intelligently discern what God requires of them and, in Christ's strength, to enthusiastically follow his plan for them. They passionately want to be used to bring people into God's kingdom.

== Publications ==
- Knaggs, James (2007). ONE DAY: A Dream for the Australian Southern Territory. Melbourne: SALVO Publishing.
- Knaggs, James; Court, Stephen (2008). ONE THING: Win The World For Jesus. Melbourne: SALVO Publishing.
- Knaggs, James; Court, Stephen (2010). ONE DAY: A Dream for The Salvation Army. Los Angeles: FRONTIER Press.
