= Alliance World Fellowship =

Protestant Christian denomination founded 1887

- Classification: Protestant
- Orientation: Evangelical
- Theology: Keswickian
- Polity: Mixed polity, including Congregationalist, Presbyterian and Episcopal elements
- President: Jonathan Schaeffer
- Region: 88 countries
- Headquarters: Reynoldsburg, Ohio, United States
- Founder: Albert Benjamin Simpson
- Origin: 1975
- Separated from: Presbyterianism
- Separations: Assemblies of God
- Congregations: 24,000
- Members: 6,700,000
- Seminaries: 90
- Official website: awf.world

The Alliance World Fellowship (or The Alliance, also C&MA and CMA) is an evangelical Christian denomination within the Higher Life movement of Christianity, teaching a modified form of Keswickian theology. It includes 6.7 million members throughout 88 countries within 24,000 churches.

== History ==
The Alliance has its origins in two organizations founded by Albert Benjamin Simpson in 1887 in Old Orchard Beach, Maine, in the United States, The Christian Alliance, which concentrated on domestic missions, and The Evangelical Missionary Alliance, which focused on overseas missions. These two organizations merged in 1897 to form the Christian and Missionary Alliance.

In 1887, in a series of sermons called The Fourfold Gospel in New York, United States, which would characterize his teaching, Simpson summarized the Gospel in four aspects; Jesus Christ Savior, Sanctifier, Healer and Soon Coming King.

The Missionary Training Institute (later including Alliance Theological Seminary), founded in 1882 by Simpson in Nyack, near New York, contributed to the development of the union. In the 21st century, the school moved again to New York City and changed its name to Alliance University. After losing its accreditation, Alliance University ceased operations in 2023, with its records transferred to Houghton College.

A.B. Simpson was influenced by Keswickian cleric W.E. Boardman in his view of sanctification. During the start of the 20th century, Simpson became closely involved with the growing Pentecostal movement. It became common for Pentecostal pastors and missionaries to receive their training at the Missionary Training Institute that Simpson founded. Consequently, Simpson and the Alliance had a great influence on Pentecostalism, in particular the Assemblies of God and the International Church of the Foursquare Gospel. This influence included evangelical emphasis, Alliance doctrine, Simpson's hymns and books, and the use of the term 'Gospel Tabernacle,' which led to many Pentecostal churches being known as 'Full Gospel Tabernacles.'

Eventually, there developed severe division within the Alliance over issues surrounding Pentecostalism (such as speaking in tongues and charismatic worship styles). By 1912, this crisis was a catalyst for the emergence of the Alliance as an organized Christian denomination, shifting more authority to the council and becoming more ecclesiastical. To ensure the survival of the Alliance in the face of division, Simpson put all property in the name of the Alliance. In the event of separation, all property would revert to Alliance.

After Simpson's death in 1919, the C&MA distanced itself from Pentecostalism, rejecting the premise that speaking in tongues is a necessary indicator of being filled with the Holy Spirit, and instead focused on the deeper Christian life. By 1930, most local branches of the Alliance functioned as churches, but still did not view themselves as such.

By 1965, the churches adopted a denominational function and established a formal statement of faith. In 1975, the Alliance World Fellowship (AWF) was officially organized. In 2010, it was present in 50 countries.

== Statistics ==
The Christian Missionary Alliance headquarters is located in Reynoldsburg, Ohio. In 2024, the CMA has 1,962 churches in the United States. This is a small decline from the 1,987 churches in the 2022 Impact Report.

According to a census published by the association in 2024, it has 24,000 churches, 6,700,000 members in 88 countries.

== Beliefs ==
The denomination has an evangelical theology, and is largely aligned with the Higher Life movement. A.B. Simpson articulated the Alliance's core theology as the Christological "Fourfold Gospel": Jesus Christ as Savior, Sanctifier, Healer, and Soon Coming King. These are represented by a cross, laver, oil pitcher, and crown in the Alliance's logo. Sanctification is sometimes described as "the deeper Christian life". This teaching is that of other churches aligned with the Higher Life movement and its Keswick Conventions. It is perhaps best exemplified by the writings of A. W. Tozer. Simpson, however, departed from traditional Keswickian teaching in his view of progressive sanctification and his rejection of suppressionism. The Alliance also emphasizes missionary work, and believes that the fulfillment of the Great Commission is the reason it exists.

Espousing a modified form of Keswickian theology, the Christian and Missionary Alliance, as with Simpson, differs from the Wesleyan-Holiness movement in that the Christian and Missionary Alliance does not see entire sanctification as cleansing one from original sin, whereas adherents of the Wesleyan-Holiness movement affirm this Methodistic teaching of John Wesley.

== Ministries ==
=== CAMA Services ===
Associated with the denomination is CAMA Services. "CAMA" stands for "Compassion and Mercy Associates". Services include a variety of relief and development efforts providing food, clothing, medical care, and job training to people in crisis situations around the globe in the name of Jesus.

Begun in 1974 by Andy Bishop as an outreach to refugees fleeing the Indochina conflict, CAMA now works in refugee camps in Thailand, and has worked with refugees in Hong Kong, Lebanon, Jordan, and Guinea, and famine victims in Burkina Faso and Mali. CAMA Services worked together with local C&MA churches in 2005 to provide Hurricane Katrina relief in the United States.

== Seminaries and colleges ==
It had 90 theological colleges.

== Controversies ==
In the 1980s, alumni of Mamou Alliance Academy in Guinea, West Africa, began to write letters to C&MA headquarters informing leadership of systemic child abuse that occurred at the school. Phone calls and letter writing of this nature to the C&MA continued for ten years.

The alumni reported that the C&MA response was evasive, deceptive, and employed "stonewalling" tactics. Alumni were reportedly told that they should forgive, and that they would "hurt the name of Jesus" by coming forward. One alumnus said that "the only way that we could get the Alliance to do anything was through the media. It was only through shaming them by putting the truth out there". Robert Fetherlin, vice president for International Ministries for the C&MA, said "We heard as far back as the 1980s that there were some questionable events that took place at Mamou. That there may have been mistreatment of children, however, we were slower than we should have been in responding to that."

In 1995, 30 alumni from Mamou approached the C&MA for an investigation and restitution. They reported systemic abuse including psychological abuse, excessive beating, sadistic dental practices performed without novocaine, sexual molestation, and rape. The following year an independent commission of inquiry (ICI) was formed and 80 testimonies were heard. In April 1998 the ICI released a report which found the denomination negligent in monitoring Mamou and in training teachers. The report identified nine offenders, of whom four were retired, three deceased and two no longer with the C&MA.

The US C&MA Board of Directors issued an open letter to the victims of abuse asking for "forgiveness for the pain and trauma that you suffered while under the care of C&MA dorm parents, teachers and missionaries."

Since these abuses occurred, the Alliance changed its policies and practices. Fetherlin said that the Alliance tried "to keep families together as much as possible, as opposed to asking parents to commit to sending their elementary children off to 'missionary kid' boarding schools", and supported homeschooling, which they had previously opposed.

The Alliance also established a Sensitive Issues Consultative Group made up of professional counselors and caregivers as part of its response to the commission's recommendations. A publication on child safety and protection entitled Safe Place was produced, a child safety and protection policy for its international work introduced, and a revised Uniform Discipline, Restoration and Appeal policy implemented that mandates denomination-wide zero-tolerance when there is a finding of sexual abuse of a child or vulnerable adult. A child protection training program which every overseas Alliance worker is required to attend was set up. Child Protection and Safety policies were published on the Alliance Web site.

== See also ==
- Born again
- Full Gospel
