= Albert Benjamin Simpson =

Canadian theologian (1843–1919)

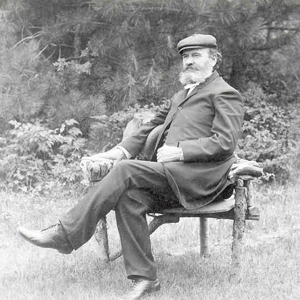
- Church: Christian and Missionary Alliance

Orders
- Ordination: by Presbyterian Church of Canada

Personal details
- Born: December 15, 1843 Cavendish, Prince Edward Island, Canada
- Died: October 29, 1919 (aged 75) Nyack, New York, U.S.
- Education: Knox College, University of Toronto

Albert Benjamin Simpson (December 15, 1843 – October 29, 1919), also known as A. B. Simpson, was a Canadian preacher, theologian, author, and founder of the Christian and Missionary Alliance (C&MA), an evangelical denomination with an emphasis on global evangelism that has been characterized as being Keswickian in theology.

== Early life ==
Simpson was born in Bayview, near Cavendish, Prince Edward Island, Canada, as the third son and fourth child of James Simpson Jr. and Janet Clark. Author Harold H. Simpson has gathered an extensive genealogy of Cavendish families in Cavendish: Its History, Its People. His research establishes the Clark family (A. B. Simpson's mother's side), as one of the founding families of Cavendish in 1790, along with the Simpson family, and he traces common ancestors between Albert B. Simpson and Lucy Maud Montgomery, the author of Anne of Green Gables.

The young Albert was raised in a strict Calvinistic Scottish Covenanter Presbyterian tradition. His conversion of faith began under the ministry of Henry Grattan Guinness, a visiting evangelist from Ireland, during the revival of 1859. Simpson spent some time in the Chatham, Ontario, area and received his theological training in Toronto at Knox College, University of Toronto.

== Presbyterian ministry ==
After graduating in 1865, Simpson was subsequently ordained in the Canada Presbyterian Church, the largest of the Presbyterian groups in Canada that merged after his departure for the United States. At age 21, he accepted a call to the large Knox Presbyterian Church (closed in 1971) in nearby Hamilton, Ontario.

In December 1873, at age 30, Simpson left Canada and assumed the pulpit of the largest Presbyterian church in Louisville, Kentucky, the Chestnut Street Presbyterian Church. It was in Louisville that he first conceived of preaching the gospel to the common man by building a simple tabernacle for that purpose. Despite his success at the Chestnut Street Church, Simpson was frustrated by their reluctance to embrace this burden for wider evangelistic endeavor.

In 1880, Simpson was called to the Thirteenth Street Presbyterian Church in New York City where he immediately began reaching out to the world with the gospel. In August 1881, he experienced divine healing of a heart problem. In October 1881, he adopted the vision of believer's baptism as a symbol of commitment and was baptized by immersion in a Baptist church. After discussing his change in beliefs at his church, he decided to leave it.

== Evangelical ministry ==
In 1881 he began an independent gospel ministry to the many new immigrants and the neglected masses of New York City. Beside active evangelistic work in the church, he published in 1882 a missionary journal, The Gospel in All Lands, the first missionary journal with pictures. Simpson also founded and began publishing an illustrated magazine entitled The Word, Work, and World. By 1911, this magazine became known as The Alliance Weekly, then Alliance Life. It is the official publication of The Christian and Missionary Alliance, in the US and Canada.

In 1882, Simpson began informal training classes in order to reach "the neglected peoples of the world with the neglected resources of the church". By 1883, a formal program was in place and ministers and missionaries were being trained in a multi-cultural context (This school was the beginning of Nyack College and Alliance Theological Seminary).

In 1885, he was invited to the International Convention of Holiness and Divine Healing in London, by the American pastor William Boardman, author of The Higher Christian Life. He taught about holiness and especially a sermon known as "Himself", that describes the sanctification as a focus on Christ himself and on his work on the cross.

In 1897 in Old Orchard Beach, Maine, Simpson founded the Christian and Missionary Alliance denomination, a merger of two organizations he had already founded - The Christian Alliance, which concentrated on domestic missions, and The Evangelical Missionary Alliance, which focused on overseas missions. Now known as The Alliance, it is currently estimated to have c. 24,000 churches and 6,700,000 members in 88 countries.

In 1889, Simpson and his church family moved into their new home at the corner of 44th St. and 8th Av. called the New York Tabernacle. This became the base not only of his ministry of evangelism in the city, but also of his growing work of worldwide missions.

== Teaching ==
In 1887, he began a series of sermons called “Fourfold Gospel” (“4-sided Gospel” or “Full Gospel”) in New York. According to him, this concept represents the 4 aspects of the ministry of Jesus Christ: "Jesus our Savior, Sanctifier, Healer, and Coming King". This Fourfold understanding defined the evangelical Christianity that emerged from the Restorationist movement and laid a critical theological foundation for the Pentecostal movement. The Fourfold Gospel is symbolized in the logo of the C&MA: the Cross (Savior), the Laver (Sanctifier), the Pitcher (Healer), and the Crown (Coming King). He came to his special emphasis in ministry through his absolute Christ-centeredness in doctrine and experience.

Albert Benjamin Simpson was largely Keswickian, teaching the doctrine of entire sanctification heralded by the Higher Life movement. Simpson, however, departed from traditional Keswickian teaching in his view of progressive sanctification and rejection of suppressionism.

Plagued by illness for much of his life since childhood, Simpson believed he experienced divine healing after understanding it to be part of the blessing of abiding in Christ as Life and healing. He emphasized healing in his Fourfold Gospel and usually devoted one meeting a week for teaching, testimonies and prayer on these lines. Although such teaching isolated him (and the C&MA) from the mainline churches that either did not emphasize or outright rejected healing, Simpson was uncompromising in his beliefs.

Simpson's heart for evangelism was to become the driving force behind the creation of the C&MA. Initially, the Christian and Missionary Alliance was not founded as a denomination, but as an organized movement of world evangelism.

In his 1890 book, A Larger Christian Life, Simpson discussed his vision for the church:

He [Jesus] is showing us the plan for a Christian Church that is much more than an association of congenial friends to listen once a week to an intellectual discourse and musical entertainment and carry on by proxy a mechanism of Christian work; but rather a Church that can be at once the mother and home of every form of help and blessing which Jesus came to give to lost and suffering men, the birthplace and the home of souls, the fountain of healing and cleansing, the sheltering home for the orphan and distressed, the school for the culture and training of God's children, the armory where they are equipped for the battle of the Lord and the army which fights those battles in His name. Such a center of population in this sad and sinful world!

Simpson composed the lyrics of over 120 hymns, 77 of which appear in the C&MA's 1962 hymnal, Hymns of the Christian Life, co-edited with R. Kelso Carter.

His missionary vision is illustrated by these words of his hymn, "The Missionary Cry":

The Master's coming draweth near.
The Son of Man will soon appear,
His Kingdom is at hand.
But ere that glorious day can be,
The Gospel of the Kingdom, we
Must preach in every land.

At the turn of the 20th century, numerous Alliance members began adopting Pentecostal beliefs as a result of the widespread experience of tongues and other spiritual manifestations within the Alliance movement and at Alliance meetings. While Simpson remained an ardent proponent of the doctrine of Spirit Baptism that was a central teaching in late nineteenth-century evangelicalism, he became publicly critical of various practices within the Pentecostal movement that he considered excessive. In particular, Simpson publicly challenged the emerging Pentecostal teaching that "speaking in tongues" was the sole acceptable evidence of baptism with the Holy Spirit. Notwithstanding his public criticism, however, in his private spiritual life, Simpson sought for the gift of tongues. While he did not ever speak in tongues, he did, in the course of his seeking, have other ecstatic experiences of the kind that often bore the criticism of Pentecostal excessiveness, such as an experience he described in his private journal, saying, "The Spirit came with a baptism of Holy laughter for an hour or more and I am waiting for all He has yet to give and manifest."

== Death ==
A. B. Simpson died in 1919 and his wife (née Margaret L. Henry) died in 1924. They are buried on the Rockland County Campus of Nyack College in Nyack, New York. Following the closure and sale of the Rockland Campus, they were disinterred on April 30, 2025, and reinterred at Oak Hill Cemetery.

== Legacy ==
A number of C&MA churches bear Simpson's name, including Simpson University in Redding, California; the Albert B. Simpson school in Lima, Peru; the A. B. Simpson Alliance School in Zamboanga City, Philippines; Sekolah Tinggi Teologi Simpson (Simpson Theological College) in Ungaran, Indonesia; and the Simpson Memorial Church in Jamalpur, Ahmedabad, India. Established in 1923, its centenary celebration was held from May 1, 2023, to April 30, 2024.

== Works ==
- The Gospel of Healing, New York: Word, Work & World Publishing Company; London: John Snow & Co. (1885); OCLC 55213901
- The Self Life and the Christ Life, Harrisburg, Pennsylvania: Christian Publications (1886); OCLC 4308382
- Divine Emblems in the Book of Genesis, New York: Word, Work and World Publishing Co. (1888); OCLC 41986359 (re-print: Nyack, New York: Christian Alliance Publishing Co. (1901); OCLC 25263492)
- The Four-Fold Gospel, New York: Word, Work & World Publishing Co. (1888); OCLC 742275515 (3rd ed., revised: New York: Christian Alliance Publishing Co. (1890); OCLC 645130107)
- Hymns and Songs of the Four-Fold Gospel, and the Fullness of Jesus, New York: Christian Alliance Publishing Co.(1890); OCLC 1111873456, 18862939
- Wholly Sanctified, New York: Christian Alliance Publishing Co. (1890); OCLC 32463133
- The Gospel of Healing (4th ed.), New York: Christian Alliance Publishing Co. (1890); OCLC 907378823
- A Larger Christian Life, New York: Christian Alliance Publishing Co. (1890); OCLC 1079825080
- The Life of Prayer (1890)
- The Christ of the Forty Days (1890)
- The Names of Jesus (1892)
- The Love Life of the Lord (3rd ed. rev. 1895)
- 'The Holy Spirit' or 'Power From on High,' New York: Christian Alliance Publications (1895); OCLC 38367937 (Part I: The Old Testament; Part II: The New Testament)
- Christ in the Tabernacle (1896)
- Days of Heaven Upon Earth: A Year Book of Scripture Texts and Living Truths (1897)
- Hymns of the Christian Life, Numbers One and Two (1897)
- Present Truths or the Supernatural (1897)
- Danger Lines in the Deeper Life (1898)
- But God: The Resources and Sufficiency of God (1899)
- Heart Messages for Sabbaths at Home (1899)
- Service for the King (1900)
- The Sweetest Christian Life (1899)
- The Apostolic Church (1900)
- The Cross of Christ (1910)
- When the Comforter came; thirty-one meditations on the Holy Spirit--one for each day in the month (1911)
- Life More Abundantly (1912)
- The Coming One (1912)
- Michele Nardi: The Italian Evangelist; His Life and Work (1916)
- The Gentle Love of the Holy Spirit

Posthumous compilations

- Songs of the Spirit: Hitherto Unpublished Poems and a Few Old Favorites (1920)
- Missionary Message (1925)
- Standing on Faith and Talks on the Self Life London: Marshall, Morgan & Scott (1932); OCLC 27093970
- Walking in the Spirit: A Series of Arresting Addresses on the Subject of the Holy Spirit in Christian Experience Harrisburg: Christian Publications (1952); OCLC 3463184

== Biographical works ==
- The Life of A.B. Simpson, by Albert E. Thompson, Brooklyn: The Christian Alliance Publishing Company (1920); OCLC 1141352704
- A.B. Simpson, His Life and Work (reprint of the 1920 edition), by Albert E. Thompson, Harrisburg: Christian Publications (1960); OCLC 613708917
- A.B.: The Unlikely Founder of a Global Movement (1st ed.), by David P. Jones, Colorado Springs: The Christian and Missionary Alliance (2019); OCLC 1114965579
- Simpson and the Making of Modern Evangelicalism. by Henry, James Daryn. A.B., Montreal ;: McGill-Queen’s University Press, 2019.
