= Aimee Semple McPherson =

Canadian-American evangelist (1890–1944)

- Sister Aimee in the early 1920s
- Born: Aimee Elizabeth Kennedy; October 9, 1890; Salford, Ontario, Canada
- Died: September 27, 1944 (aged 53); Oakland, California, US
- Resting place: Forest Lawn Memorial Park Cemetery (Glendale)
- Known for: Founding the Foursquare Church
- Spouse: Robert Semple (m. 1908; died 1910) Harold McPherson (m. 1912; div. 1921) David Hutton (m. 1931; div. 1934)
- Children: Roberta Semple Salter (1910–2007); Rolf McPherson (1913–2009)

Aimee Elizabeth Semple McPherson (née Kennedy; October 9, 1890 – September 27, 1944), also known as Sister Aimee or Sister, was a Canadian-born American Pentecostal evangelist and media celebrity in the 1920s and 1930s, famous for founding the Foursquare Church. McPherson pioneered the use of broadcast mass media for wider dissemination of both religious services and appeals for donations, using radio to draw both audience and revenue with the growing appeal of popular entertainment and incorporating stage techniques into her weekly sermons at Angelus Temple, an early megachurch.

In her time, she was the most publicized Protestant evangelist, surpassing Billy Sunday and other predecessors. She conducted public faith healing demonstrations involving tens of thousands of participants. McPherson's view of the United States as a nation founded and sustained by divine inspiration influenced later pastors.

National news coverage focused on events surrounding her family and church members, including accusations that she fabricated her reported kidnapping. McPherson's preaching style, extensive charity work, and ecumenical contributions were major influences on 20th-century Charismatic Christianity.

== Biography ==
=== Early life ===
McPherson was born Aimee Elizabeth Kennedy in Salford, Ontario, Canada, to James Morgan and Mildred Ona (Pearce) Kennedy (1871–1947). From an early age, she was exposed to religion by her mother, who worked with the poor in Salvation Army soup kitchens. When she was a child, she played "Salvation Army" with her classmates and she preached sermons to dolls.

When she was a teenager, McPherson strayed from her mother's teachings by reading novels, watching movies and attending dances, activities which the Salvation Army and her Methodist father disapproved of. In high school, she was taught the theory of evolution. She began to ask questions about faith and science but she was unsatisfied with the answers. She wrote to a Canadian newspaper, questioning the taxpayer-funded teaching of evolution. This was her first exposure to fame, as people nationwide responded to her letter, and the beginning of a lifelong anti-evolution crusade.

=== Conversion, marriage, and family ===
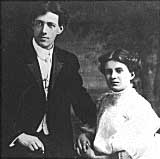
Robert and Aimee Semple (1910)

While she was attending a revival meeting in 1907, McPherson met Robert James Semple, a Pentecostal missionary from Ireland. She dedicated her life to Jesus and converted to Pentecostalism. At the meeting, she became enraptured by Semple and his message. After a short courtship, they were married in a Salvation Army ceremony in August 1908. Semple supported them as a foundry worker and he also preached at the local Pentecostal mission. They studied the Bible together, then they moved to Chicago and joined William Durham's Full Gospel Assembly. Durham instructed her in the practice of interpretation of tongues.

Aimee Semple and her second husband Harold McPherson. For a time Harold traveled with his wife Aimee in the "Gospel Car" as an itinerant preacher.

After embarking on an evangelistic tour in China, both of them contracted malaria. He also contracted dysentery, which he died of in Hong Kong, while she recovered and bore their daughter Roberta Star Semple. Although she claimed that she considered staying in China because she wanted to continue his work, she returned to the United States after her mother sent money for a return ticket.

After recuperating in the United States, Semple joined her mother Mildred by working with the Salvation Army. While she was in New York City, she met accountant Harold Stewart McPherson. They married in 1912, moved to Providence, Rhode Island, and had a son, Rolf Potter Kennedy McPherson. During that time, McPherson believed that she had denied her "calling" to go and preach. Struggling with emotional distress and obsessive–compulsive disorder, she wept and prayed. In 1914, she fell seriously ill with appendicitis. She later said that after a failed operation, she heard a voice which was asking her to go and preach. After accepting the voice's challenge, she said, she could turn over in bed without pain. In 1915, her husband returned home and discovered that she had left him and she had also taken the children. A few weeks later, he received a note from her and in it, she invited him to join her in evangelistic work.

Aimee Semple McPherson and her third husband, David L. Hutton, enjoying their honeymoon breakfast in 1932. Hutton assisted in some of McPherson's charity work before their divorce in 1934.

Harold McPherson followed her in an attempt to bring her home but he changed his mind after he saw her preach. He joined her in evangelism, setting up tents for revival meetings and preaching. The couple sold their house and lived in their "gospel car". Despite his initial feeling of enthusiasm, Harold began leaving the crusade for long periods of time in the late 1910s. Initially attempting to launch his own career as a traveling evangelist, he eventually returned to Rhode Island and he also returned to his secular job. The couple divorced in 1921.

In 1932, McPherson married actor and musician David Hutton. After she fell and fractured her skull, she visited Europe to recover. While she was there, she was angered to learn that Hutton was billing himself as "Aimee's man" in his cabaret singing act and he was frequently photographed with scantily clad women. Hutton's personal scandals were damaging the reputation of the Foursquare Church and its leader. McPherson and Hutton separated in 1933 and divorced in 1934. McPherson later publicly repented of the marriage for both theological and personal reasons and rejected gospel singer Homer Rodeheaver when he proposed marriage in 1935.

=== Ministry ===
As part of Durham's Full Gospel Assembly in Chicago, McPherson became known for interpreting tongues, translating the words of people speaking in tongues. In 1913 McPherson began evangelizing, holding tent revivals across the sawdust trail. McPherson quickly amassed a large following, often relocating to larger buildings to accommodate growing crowds. She emulated the enthusiasm of Pentecostal meetings but sought to avoid excesses, in which participants would shout, tremble on the floor, and speak in tongues. McPherson set up a separate tent area for such displays of religious fervor, which could be off-putting to larger audiences.

Evangelist and faith healer Maria Woodworth-Etter greatly influenced McPherson. Etter had broken the glass ceiling for popular female preachers, drawing crowds of thousands, and her style influenced the Pentecostal Movement. The two met in person on several occasions prior to Etter's death in 1924.

In 1916, McPherson embarked on a tour of the southern United States, and again in 1918 with Mildred Kennedy. Standing on the back seat of their convertible, McPherson preached sermons over a megaphone. In 1917, she started a magazine, Bridal Call, for which she wrote articles about women's roles in religion; she portrayed the link between Christians and Jesus as a marriage bond. Along with taking women's roles seriously, the magazine contributed to transforming Pentecostalism into an ongoing American religious presence.

In Baltimore in 1919 she was first "discovered" by newspapers after conducting evangelistic services at the Lyric Opera House, where she performed faith-healing demonstrations. During these events the crowds in their religious ecstasy were barely kept under control. Baltimore became a pivotal point for her early career.

She was ordained as an evangelist by the Assemblies of God USA in 1919. However, she ended her association with the Assemblies of God in 1922.

=== Career in Los Angeles ===
In 1918, McPherson and her daughter Roberta contracted Spanish influenza. While McPherson's case was not serious, Roberta was near death. According to McPherson, while praying over her daughter she experienced a vision in which God told her he would give her a home in California. In October 1918 McPherson and her family drove from New York to Los Angeles over two months, with McPherson preaching revivals along the way. McPherson's first revival in Los Angeles was held at Victoria Hall, a 1,000-seat auditorium downtown. She soon reached capacity there and had to relocate to the 3,500 capacity Temple Auditorium on Pershing Square, where people waited for hours to enter the crowded venue. Afterwards, attendees of her meetings built a home for her family. At this time, Los Angeles was a popular vacation destination. Rather than touring the United States, McPherson chose to stay in Los Angeles, drawing audiences from both tourists and the city's burgeoning population.

For several years, she traveled and raised money for the construction of a large, domed church in Echo Park, named Angelus Temple, in reference to the Angelus bells and to angels. Not wanting to incur debt, McPherson found a construction firm willing to work with her as funds were raised "by faith", beginning with $5,000 for the foundation. McPherson mobilized diverse groups to fund and build the church, by means such as selling chairs for Temple seating. In his book, Growing up in Hollywood, Robert Parrish describes in detail attending one of her services.

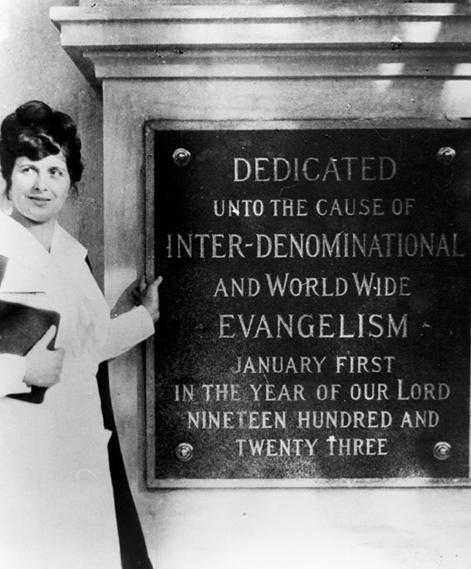
McPherson dedicating Angelus Temple in 1923

Raising more money than expected, McPherson altered the plans and built a "megachurch". The endeavor cost contributors around $250,000. Costs were kept down by donations of building materials and labor. The dedication took place in January 1923. Enrollment grew to over 10,000, and Angelus Temple was advertised as the largest single Christian congregation in the world. According to church records, the Temple received 40 million visitors within the first seven years.

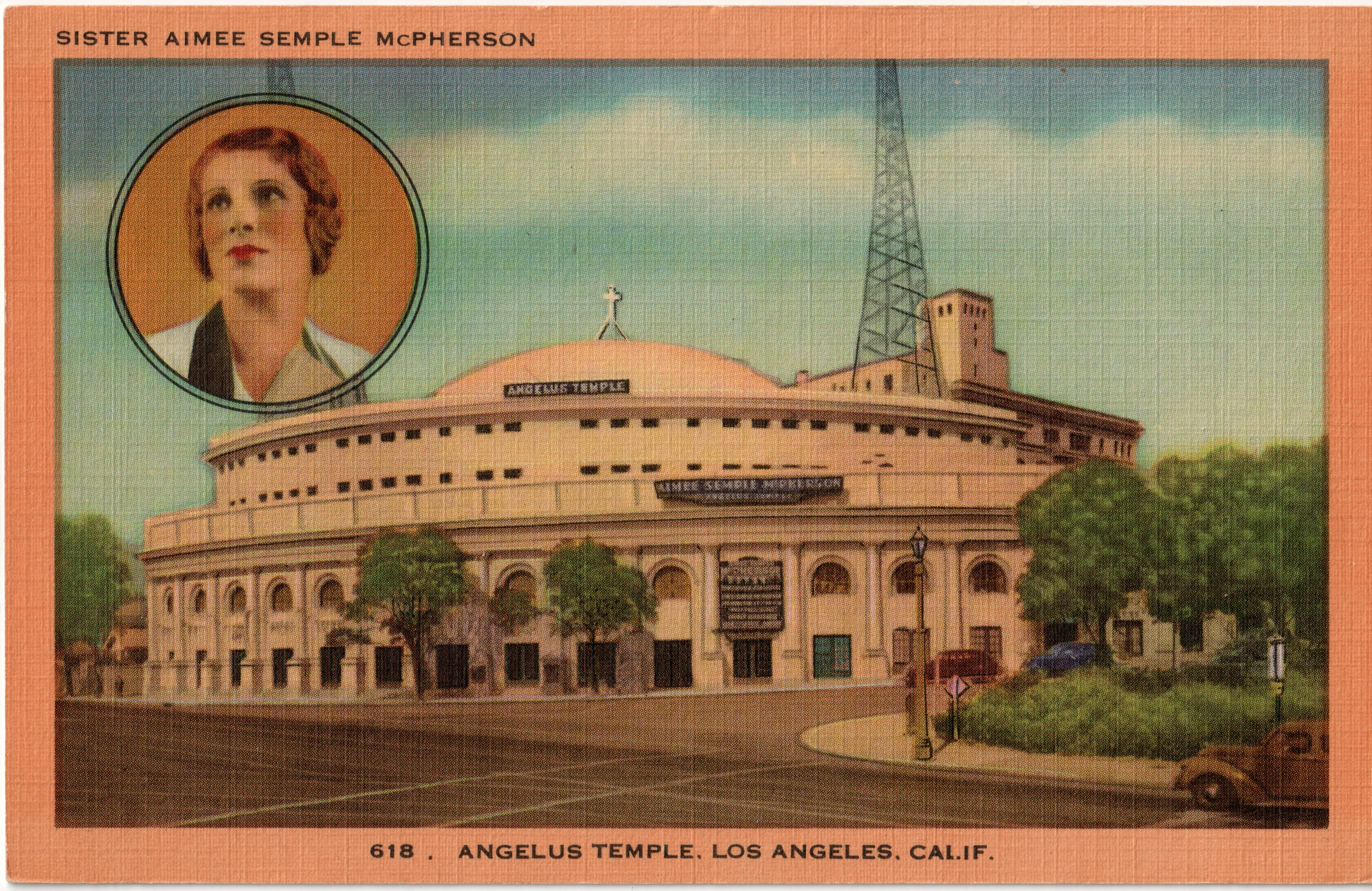
Sister Aimee Semple McPherson's Angelus Temple in Los Angeles, circa 1940s

=== Charitable work ===
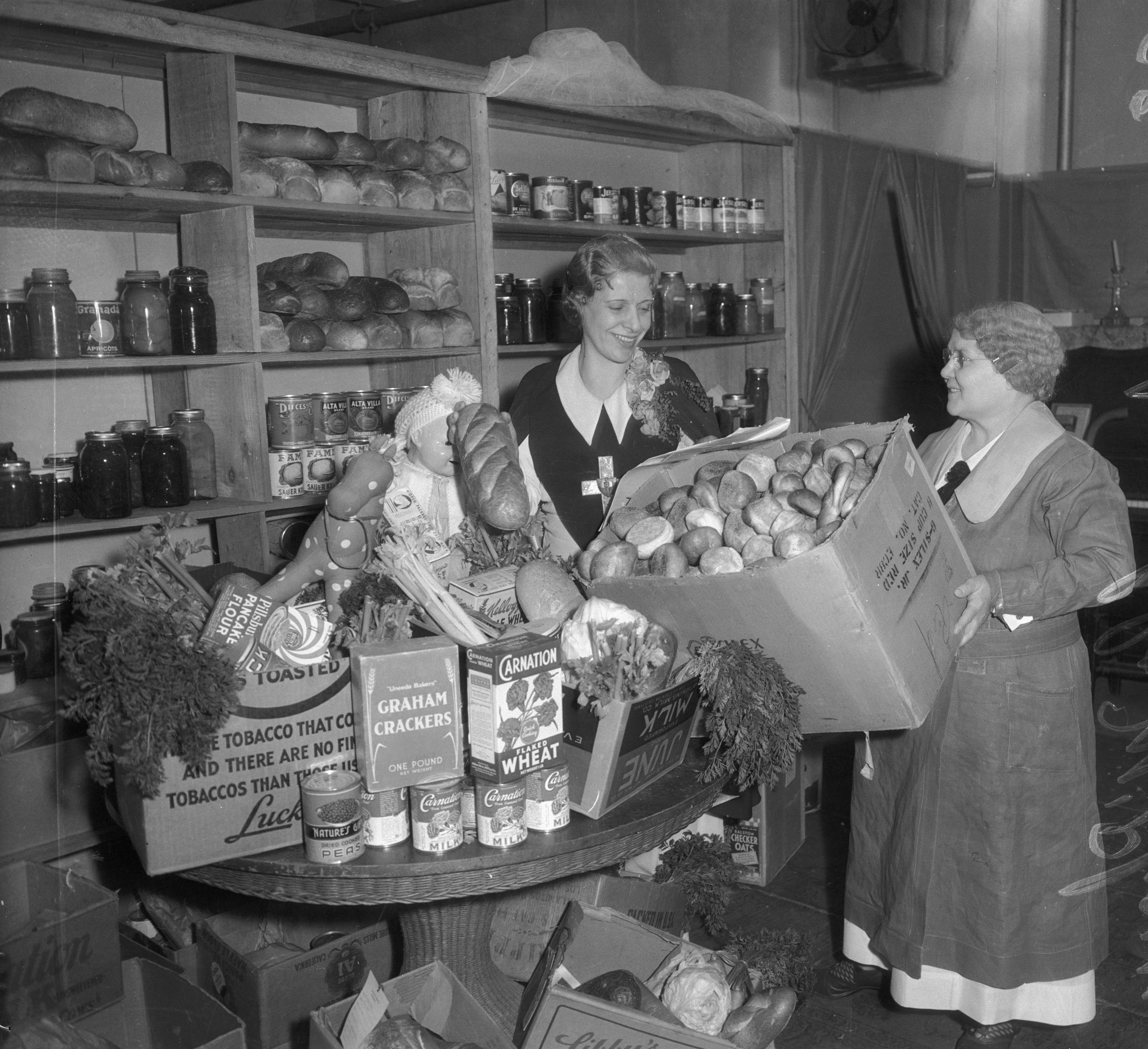
McPherson (left) prepares Christmas food baskets (circa 1935)

McPherson developed a church organization to provide for physical as well as spiritual needs. McPherson mobilized people to get involved in charity and social work, saying that "true Christianity is not only to be good but to do good." The Temple collected donations for humanitarian relief including for a Japanese disaster and a German relief fund. Men released from prison were found jobs by a "brotherhood". A "sisterhood" sewed baby clothing for impoverished mothers.

In June 1925, after an earthquake in Santa Barbara, McPherson interrupted a radio broadcast to request food, blankets, clothing, and emergency supplies. In 1928, after a dam failure killed hundreds, McPherson's church led the relief effort. After a 1933 earthquake in Long Beach, McPherson quickly arranged for volunteers to offer blankets, coffee, and doughnuts. McPherson persuaded fire and police departments to assist in distribution. Doctors, physicians, and dentists staffed her free clinic that trained nurses to treat children and the elderly. To prevent disruption of electricity service to homes of overdue accounts during the winter, a cash reserve was set up with the utility company.

Men wait in line at McPherson (Hutton)'s Angelus Temple Free Dining Hall & Commissary on Temple St.

Drawing from her childhood experience with the Salvation Army, in 1927 McPherson opened a commissary at Angelus Temple offering food, clothing, and blankets. She became active in creating soup kitchens, free clinics, and other charitable activities during the Great Depression, feeding an estimated 1.5 million. Volunteer workers filled commissary baskets with food and other items, as well as Foursquare Gospel literature. When the government shut down the free school-lunch program, McPherson took it over. Her giving "alleviated suffering on an epic scale".

Line of unemployed men getting meals at dining hall run by McPherson, 1932

As McPherson did not distinguish between the "deserving" and the "undeserving," her commissary became known as an effective and inclusive aid institution, assisting more families than other public or private institutions. Because her programs aided nonresidents such as migrants from other states and Mexico, she ran afoul of California state regulations. Though temple guidelines were later officially adjusted to accommodate those policies, helping families in need was a priority, regardless of their place of residence.

== Ministry ==
=== Style of ministry ===
In August 1925, McPherson chartered a plane to Los Angeles to give her Sunday sermon. Aware of the opportunity for publicity, she arranged for followers and press at the airport. The plane failed after takeoff and the landing gear collapsed, sending the nose of the plane into the ground. McPherson used the experience as the narrative of an illustrated sermon called "The Heavenly Airplane", featuring the devil as pilot, sin as the engine, and temptation as propeller.

Angelus Temple, completed in 1923, is the center of the International Church of the Foursquare Gospel founded by McPherson. In 1992, Angelus Temple was designated a National Historic Landmark, and remains in use.

On another occasion, she described being pulled over by a police officer, calling the sermon "Arrested for Speeding". Dressed in a traffic cop's uniform, she sat in a police motorcycle and blared the siren. One author in attendance wrote that she drove the motorcycle across the access ramp to the pulpit, slammed the brakes, and raised a hand to shout "Stop! You're speeding to Hell!"

McPherson employed a small group of artists, electricians, decorators, and carpenters who built sets for each service. Religious music was played by an orchestra. McPherson also worked on elaborate sacred operas. One production, The Iron Furnace, based on Exodus, saw Hollywood actors assist with obtaining costumes.

McPherson surrounded by choirs at Angelus Temple for a musical requiem in 1929

Though McPherson condemned theater and film as the devil's workshop, its techniques were co-opted. She became the first woman evangelist to adopt cinematic methods to avoid dreary church services. Serious messages were delivered in a humorous tone. Animals were frequently incorporated. McPherson gave up to 22 sermons a week, including lavish Sunday night services so large that extra trolleys and police helped route the traffic through Echo Park. To finance the Temple and its projects, collections were taken at every meeting.

McPherson used progressive methods to preach her message, taking advantage of radio, movies, and stage acts. She attracted some women associated with modernism, but others were put off by the contrast between her message and her presentation.

McPherson and a group of tambourine players leading a service at Angelus Temple. She produced innovative weekly dramas illustrating religious themes.

The battle between fundamentalists and modernists escalated after World War I. Fundamentalists generally believed their faith should influence every aspect of their lives. Despite her modern style, McPherson aligned with the fundamentalists in seeking to eradicate modernism and secularism in homes, churches, schools, and communities.

The appeal of McPherson's revival events from 1919 to 1922 surpassed any touring event of theater or politics in American history. She broke attendance records recently set by Billy Sunday and frequently used his temporary tabernacle structures to hold her roving revival meetings. One such event was held in a boxing ring, and throughout the boxing event, she carried a sign reading "knock out the Devil". In San Diego the city called in a detachment of Marines to help police control a revival crowd of over 30,000 people.

== Faith healing ministry ==
McPherson's ability to draw crowds was greatly assisted by her faith healing presentations. According to Nancy Barr Mavity, an early McPherson biographer, the evangelist claimed that when she laid hands on sick or injured persons, they got well because of the power of God in her. McPherson's first reported successful public faith healing session of another person was in Corona, New York, on Long Island, in 1916. A young woman in the advanced stages of rheumatoid arthritis was brought to the altar by friends just as McPherson preached "Jesus Christ is the same yesterday, today and forever". McPherson laid her hands upon the woman's head, and the woman left the church that night without crutches. McPherson's reputation as a faith healer grew as people came to her by the tens of thousands. McPherson's faith-healing practices were extensively covered in the news and were a large part of her early-career success. Over time, she largely withdrew from faith-healing, but still scheduled weekly and monthly healing sessions that remained popular until her death.

In 1919, Harold left her as he did not enjoy the traveling lifestyle. Her mother then joined her and the children on tour. She began her faith-healing work the same year.

McPherson said she experienced several of her own personal faith healing incidents. One occurred in 1909, when her broken foot was mended, an event that served to introduce her to the possibilities of the healing power of faith. Another was an unexpected recovery from an operation in 1914, where hospital staff expected her to die. In 1916, before a gathered revival tent crowd, Aimee experienced swift rejuvenation of blistered skin from a serious flash burn caused by a lamp that had exploded in her face.

According to Mildred Kennedy, the crowds at the revivals were easily twice as large as McPherson reported in her letters and the healings were not optimistic exaggerations. Kennedy said she witnessed visible cancers disappear, the deaf hear, the blind see, and the disabled walk.

=== Spreckels Organ Pavilion (1921) ===
Aimee Semple McPherson conducting a healing ceremony at the Spreckels Organ Pavilion in 1921. Police support along with U.S. Marines and Army personnel helped manage traffic and the estimated 30,000 people who attended.

In January 1921 McPherson conducted a healing ceremony at the Spreckels Organ Pavilion in Balboa Park in San Diego, California. Police, U.S. Marines, and Army personnel helped manage traffic and the estimated 30,000 attendees. She had to move to the outdoor site after the audience grew too large for the 3,000-seat Dreamland Boxing Arena.

During the engagement, a woman paralyzed from the waist down was presented for faith healing. McPherson feared she would be run out of town if this healing did not manifest, due to previous demonstrations that had occurred at her smaller events. McPherson prayed and laid hands on her, and the woman got up out of her wheelchair and walked. Other unwell persons came to the platform McPherson occupied, though not all were cured.

Due to the demand for her services, her stay was extended. McPherson prayed for hours without food or stopping for a break. At the end of the day, she was taken away by her staff, dehydrated and unsteady with fatigue. McPherson wrote of the day, "As soon as one was healed, she ran and told nine others, and brought them too, even telegraphing and rushing the sick on trains". Originally planned for two weeks in the evenings, McPherson's Balboa Park revival meetings lasted over five weeks and went from dawn until dusk.

=== 1921–1922 ===
At a revival meeting in August 1921, in San Francisco, journalists posing as scientific investigators diverted healing claimants as they descended from the platform and "cross-examined as to the genuineness of the cure." Concurrently, a group of doctors from the American Medical Association in San Francisco secretly investigated some of McPherson's local revival meetings. The subsequent AMA report stated McPherson's healing was "genuine, beneficial and wonderful". This also was the tone of press clippings, testimonials, and private correspondence in regards to the healings.

Stretcher Day at Revival in Municipal Auditorium at Denver, Colorado, 1921. The event attracted a capacity crowd of 12,000 attendees. People were carried in on cots, stretchers, chairs and beds; and awaited McPherson to pray over them for healing.

In 1921 during the Denver campaign, a Serbian Romani tribe chief, Dewy Mark and his mother said they were faith-healed by McPherson of a respiratory illness and a "fibroid tumor." For the next year the Romani king, by letter and telegram urged all other Romani to follow McPherson and "her wonderful Lord Jesus." Thousands of others from the Mark and Mitchell tribes came to her in caravans from all over the country and were converted with healings being reported from a number of them. Funds in gold, taken from necklaces, other jewelry, and elsewhere, were given by Romani in gratitude and helped fund the construction of the new Angelus Temple. Hundreds of people regularly attended services at the newly built Angeles Temple in Los Angeles. Many Romani followed her to a revival gathering in Wichita, Kansas, and on May 29, 1922, heavy thunderstorms threatened to rain out the thousands who gathered there. McPherson interrupted the speaker, raised her hand to the sky, and prayed, "if the land hath need of it, let it fall (the rain) after the message has been delivered to these hungry souls". To the crowd's surprise, the rain immediately stopped. Many believed they witnessed a miracle. The event was reported the following day by the Wichita Eagle. For the gathered Romani, it was a further acknowledgement "of the woman's power". Until that time, the Romani in the US were largely unreached by Christianity. The infusion of crosses and other symbols of Christianity alongside Romani astrology charts and crystal balls was the result of McPherson's influence.

In 1922, McPherson returned for a second tour in the Great Revival of Denver and asked about people who have stated healings from the previous visit. Seventeen people, some well-known members of the community, testified, giving credence to the audience of her belief that "healing still occurred among modern Christians".

In 1928, when two clergymen were preaching against her and her "divine healing," McPherson's staff assembled thousands of documents and attached to each of them photos, medical certificates, X-rays. and testimonies of healing. The information gathered was used to silence the clergymen's accusations and was also later accessed by some McPherson biographers.

In later years, McPherson identified other individuals with a faith healing gift. During regular healing sessions she worked among them but over time she mostly withdrew from the faith healing aspect of her services, as she found that it was overwhelming other areas of her ministry.

Scheduled healing sessions nevertheless remained highly popular with the public until her death in 1944. One of these was Stretcher Day, which was held behind the Angeles Temple parsonage once every five or six weeks. This was for the most serious of the infirm who could only be moved by stretcher. Ambulances arrived at the parsonage and McPherson entered, greeted the patients, and prayed over them. On Stretcher Day, so many ambulances were in demand that Los Angeles area hospitals and medical centers had to make a point of reserving a few for other needs and emergencies.

=== McPherson's faith healing in the media ===
McPherson's faith-healing demonstrations were extensively covered in the news media and were a large part of her early career legacy. James Robinson, an author on Pentecostalism, diverse healing and holiness traditions, writes: "In terms of results, the healings associated with her were among the most impressive in late modern history.".

Aimee Semple McPherson's apparently successful faith healings attracted large crowds and journalists to her revivals.

In April 1920, a Washington Times reporter conveyed that for McPherson's work to be a hoax on such a grand scale was inconceivable, communicating that the healings were occurring more rapidly than he could record them. To help verify the testimonies, as per his editor, the reporter took names and addresses of those he saw and with whom he spoke. Documentation, including news articles, letters, and testimonials, indicated sick people came to her by the tens of thousands. According to these sources, some healings were only temporary, while others were lifelong.

In 1921 a survey was sent out by First Baptist Church Pastor William Keeney Towner in San Jose, California, to 3,300 people to investigate McPherson's healing services. 2500 persons responded and 6% indicated they were immediately and completely healed while 85% indicated they were partially healed and continued to improve ever since. Fewer than 0.5% did not feel they were at least spiritually uplifted and had their faith strengthened.

Denver Post reporter Frances Wayne wrote that while McPherson's "attack" on sin was "uncultured,...the deaf heard, the blind saw, the paralytic walked, the palsied became calm, before the eyes of as many people that could be packed into the largest church auditorium in Denver".

After McPherson's death, LIFE Magazine wrote, "her vast popularity derived in part from the skill with which she applied theatrical techniques to the art of homiletics".

=== Views on McPherson's work ===
In 1921, some members of Lodi California's First Congregational Church attended McPherson's tent revival meeting in San Jose California and returned speaking enthusiastically of healings and conversions. Their Oxford-educated Pastor Charles S. Price (1887–1947), believed what they underwent was "metaphysical, psychological, nothing tangible," and "they had been inoculated with a strange serum, had "gotten the hallelujahs." He went to San Jose to learn how to "straighten them out." Price was eventually persuaded by McPherson who "won more people to Jesus Christ in one afternoon" than he could recall in fourteen years of ministry. He became her assistant and starting in 1922 went on to preach as a traveling evangelist who converted tens of thousands along with many instances of miraculous divine healings that were stated to have occurred.

Although he was an agnostic, Charles Chaplin discreetly enjoyed listening to McPherson's Sunday night illustrated sermons. He was astounded by the healings he saw in her services. He thought they might be a combination of McPherson's skilled hypnotism and the power she commanded over the crowds.

In October 1921, crowds filled the auditorium at Canton, Ohio, and many people who were carried to the platform for prayer walked away unassisted. Crutches and braces were left behind while the blind stated they could see and the deaf could hear. Though six local ministers concurred that the work was a "genuine manifestation of God to fulfill his promises," three others did not commit and P.H. Welshimer of First Christian Church, a congregation of 6,000 members, stated the healings were the result of hypnotism and "mesmeric power". According to a church publication, psychologist and hypnotist, Professor D. H. Deamude, who was in town during the campaign, said that, based on his expertise, hypnotism could not account for whatever McPherson was doing.

Actor Anthony Quinn, who for a time played in the church's band and was an apprentice preacher, in this partial quote, recalls a service:

I sat in the orchestra pit of the huge auditorium at the Angelus Temple. Every seat was filled, with the crowd spilling into the aisles. Many were on crutches or in wheelchairs. Suddenly a figure with bright red hair and a flowing white gown walked out to the center of the stage. In a soft voice, almost a whisper, she said, "Brothers and sisters, is there anyone here who wants to be cured tonight?" Long lines formed to reach her. She stood center stage and greeted each one. One man said, "I can't see out of one eye." She asked. "Do you believe, brother?" And suddenly, the man cried, "Yes, sister, I can see, I can see!" And the audience went crazy. To a woman dragging herself across the stage on crutches she said, "Throw away that crutch!" Suddenly, the woman threw away her crutch and ran into Aimee's open arms. I left that service exhilarated, renewed.

Biographer Daniel Mark Epstein wrote that described incidents of miraculous faith healing are sometimes clinically explained as a result of hysteria or a form of hypnosis. Strong emotions and the mind's ability to trigger the production of opiates, endorphins, and enkephalins have also been offered as explanations, as well as the suggestion that the healings were simply faked. In an interview with the Baltimore Sun, Epstein said:

There is no doubt in my mind that this was a great and courageous woman, whose religious inspiration was totally authentic. I tried to find some evidence in the voluminous newspaper accounts of her healings, of fraud. There is none. Instead, I found hundreds of pages of newspaper documentation of reporters who were overwhelmed by what they saw at the healing services. The famous phrase used back then was 'those who came to scoff stayed to pray.

Years later, Epstein interviewed Rolf McPherson, his mother's appointed successor who spoke of the period: "more patients were open to the possibilities of faith healing." Next to him, mounted on his office wall, was a hand-tinted photo enlargement of his mother helping a woman out her wheelchair in Balboa Park. He speculated that healings occurred because people had more faith in God and less in science, and he could not "imagine this sort of thing happening again."

=== Personal and religious views ===
When McPherson retired after a long and exhausting faith healing service, she would sometimes suffer from insomnia, a problem she contended with for the rest of her life.

She did not abstain from visiting doctors or using medicine to treat her own illnesses.

When traveling abroad, she paid scrupulous attention to sanitation, concerned that a careless oversight might result in acquiring an exotic disease.

When asked by a journalist about her demonstrations, McPherson said, "the saving of souls is the most important part of my ministry.".

McPherson considered each faith healing incident a sacred gift from God, the glory of Jesus Christ, passed through her to persons healed and not to be taken for granted.

Divine healing, in her view, was a church sacrament rather than entertainment. In her own writings and sermons, McPherson did not refer to divine healing as being accessible by faith and devotion. She disliked being given credit for the healings, considering herself the medium through which the power flowed, with the power of Christ working the cure.

== Foursquare Church ==
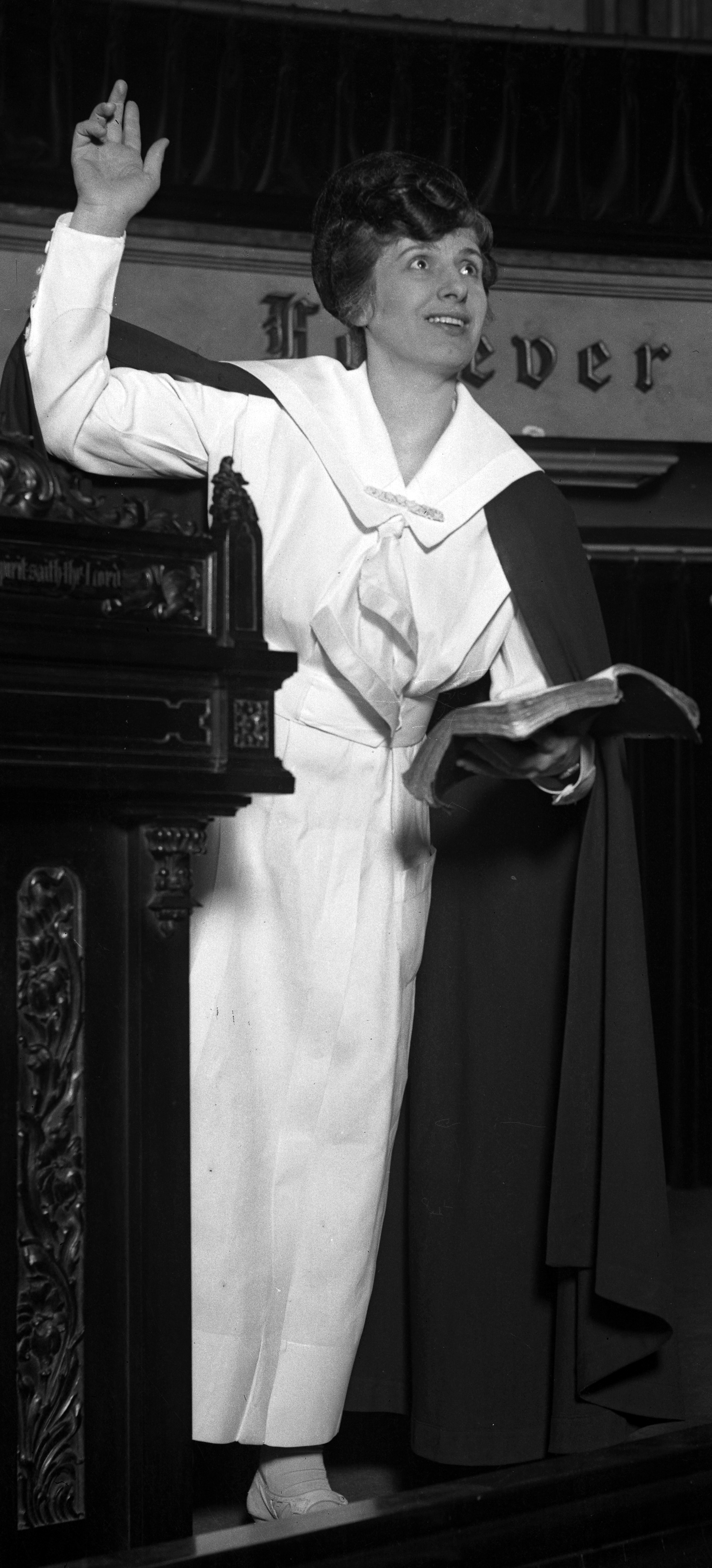
McPherson preaching at the newly built Angelus Temple in 1923

McPherson published the weekly Foursquare Crusader. She began broadcasting on radio in the early 1920s. In April 1922, she became the first woman to preach a sermon wirelessly. With the opening of Foursquare Gospel-owned KFSG in 1924, she became the second woman granted a broadcast license by the Department of Commerce, which supervised broadcasting at the time.

In October 1922, she explained her vision of "Foursquare Gospel" (or "Full Gospel") in a sermon in Oakland, California. This represents the four aspects of the ministry of Jesus Christ: Savior, Baptizer with the Holy Ghost, Healer and King.

McPherson racially integrated her tent meetings and church services. On one occasion in 1924, as a response to integration, hundreds of Ku Klux Klan members were in attendance. McPherson told them a parable about Jesus appearing to a black man and telling him, he, too, had been refused admittance to an all-white church, and allegedly stared at them until they exited the temple. They returned without their hoods and robes, and after the service they were found on the ground nearby. Though she did maintain some level of support for white supremacists and KKK members, sharing the pulpit at Angelus Temple with some, she is also credited with helping Hispanic ministries in Los Angeles.

McPherson caused concern among some Los Angeles churches. Though she shared many of their fundamentalist beliefs, her lavish sermons and faith-healing events, along with her status as a female divorcee, were unprecedented, and her style of dress drew emulators. Her illustrated sermons attracted criticism from some clergy members for allegedly turning the Gospel message into mundane entertainment. Faith healing was considered to be unique to Apostolic times. Rival radio evangelist Robert P. Shuler published a pamphlet titled McPhersonism, in which he called her ministry "out of harmony with God's word." Debates such as the Bogard-McPherson debate in 1934 drew further attention to the controversy.

The newly forming Assemblies of God denomination worked with her for a time, but it encouraged her to separate her church from established Protestant faiths. McPherson resisted trends to isolate her church as a denomination and continued her evangelical coalition-building. She was helped by the establishment of L.I.F.E. Bible College adjacent to the Temple, which was intended to train ministers so they could share her new "Foursquare Gospel" both nationally and internationally. Methodist minister Frank Thompson ran the college, teaching students the doctrines of John Wesley, while McPherson and others infused them with Pentecostal ideals. McPherson's efforts eventually led Pentecostals, who were previously on the periphery of Christianity, into mainstream American evangelicalism.

== Life in the media spotlight ==
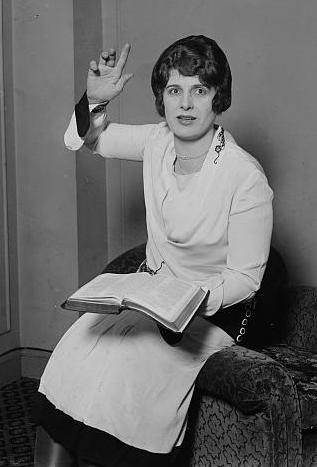
McPherson (early 1920s)

By early 1926, McPherson had become one of the most charismatic and influential women and ministers of her time. Her fame equaled, to name a few, Charles Lindbergh, Johnny Weissmuller, Jack Dempsey, Babe Ruth, Ty Cobb, Knute Rockne, Bobby Jones, Louise Brooks, and Rudolph Valentino. She was a major American phenomenon, who along with some other high-profile preachers of the time, unlike Hollywood celebrities, could be admired by their adoring public, "without apparently compromising their souls."

McPherson crusaded against Darwinian evolution and she supported William Jennings Bryan during the 1925 Scopes trial, about local laws prohibiting the teaching of human evolution. Bryan and McPherson worked together in the Temple, and they believed that Darwinism undermined morality, "poisoning the minds of the children of the nation." McPherson organized an all-night prayer service, preceded by a Bible parade through Los Angeles.

McPherson's political alignment was undisclosed. She endorsed Herbert Hoover but she supported Franklin D. Roosevelt and his social programs after his election. She patronized organized labor, preaching that a gangster's money was "no more unclean than the dollars of the man who amasses his millions from underpaid factory workers". She was more cautious when labor strikes resulted in violent uprisings, and she was worried about communism's influence in labor unions. McPherson opposed both communism and fascism because she believed that they advocated the imposition of totalitarian rule; communism ruling without God and fascism wrongly stating to represent the power of God.

McPherson did not consistently align herself with any broad conservative or liberal political agenda. Instead, she wanted Christianity to occupy a central place in national life. The Foursquare Gospel Church currently qualifies the evangelist's views "in light of the political and religious climate of the 1920s, 30s, and 40s," contrasting her approach with "today's extreme fundamentalist, right-wing Christianity." She was also one of the first prominent Christian ministers who defended the establishment of a Jewish homeland in Palestine.

== Reported kidnapping ==
Mildred Kennedy doing radio interview with deep-sea diver R.C. Crawford during search for McPherson's body in Santa Monica, California, 1926

McPherson's reported kidnapping caused a media frenzy and changed her life and career. On May 18, 1926, McPherson disappeared from Ocean Park Beach in Santa Monica, California. Presuming she had drowned, searchers combed the area. McPherson sightings were reported around the county, often many miles apart. The Temple received calls and letters claiming knowledge of McPherson, including ransom demands.

After weeks of unpromising leads, Mildred Kennedy believed her daughter was dead.

After the Temple's memorial service on June 23, Kennedy received a phone call from Douglas, Arizona. McPherson was alive in a Douglas hospital and relating her story to officials.

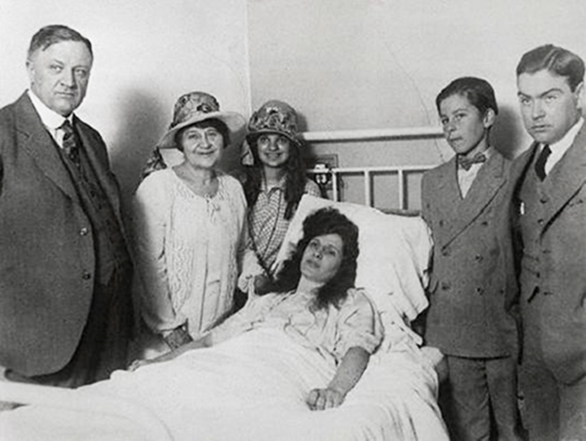
After emerging from the Mexican desert, McPherson convalesces in a hospital with her family in Douglas, Arizona, 1926. District Attorney Asa Keyes stands to the far left with Mildred Kennedy (mother) next to Roberta Star Semple, middle left (daughter). On the far right, Deputy District Attorney Joseph Ryan is alongside her son, Rolf McPherson.

McPherson said she had been approached at the beach by a couple who wanted her to pray over their sick child. After walking with them to their car, she was shoved inside. A cloth laced with chloroform was held against her face, causing her to pass out. Eventually, she was moved to a shack in the Mexican desert. When her captors were away, McPherson escaped out a window and traveled through the desert for 11–17 hours and an estimated 17–20 miles (27–32 km), reaching Agua Prieta, Sonora, a Mexican border town, at around 1:00 a.m. Collapsing near a house, the evangelist was taken by locals to adjacent Douglas.

Her return to Los Angeles was greeted by 30,000–50,000 people, a greater turnout than President Woodrow Wilson's 1919 visit to Los Angeles.

=== Grand jury's inquiries ===
Los Angeles prosecutors had varying theories of her disappearance, among them a publicity stunt, and finally contended that McPherson ran off with a former employee, Kenneth Ormiston, staying with him in a California resort town cottage he had rented. After leaving the cottage at the end of May, the pair traveled for the next three weeks and remained hidden. Around June 22, Ormiston drove McPherson to Mexico, dropping her off three miles outside nearby Agua Prieta, where she walked the remaining distance. In contrast, McPherson consistently maintained her kidnapping story, and defense witnesses corroborated her assertions.

Much of the evidence against McPherson came from reporters, who passed it on to police. The bulk of the investigation against her was funded by Los Angeles-area newspapers, at an estimated cost of $500,000. The secrecy of California's grand jury proceedings was ignored by both sides as the Los Angeles prosecution passed new developments to the press, while the evangelist used her radio station to broadcast her side of the story.

=== Dismissal and aftermath of the case ===
On November 3, the case was to be moved to a jury trial set for January 1927, charging McPherson, her mother, and other defendants with criminal conspiracy, perjury, and obstruction of justice. If convicted, McPherson faced a maximum prison time of 42 years but the prosecution's case developed credibility issues. Witnesses changed testimonies, and evidence often appeared to have suspicious origins or was mishandled and lost in custody. On January 2, Ormiston identified another woman as the companion who stayed with him at the cottage. All charges against McPherson and associated parties were dropped for lack of evidence on January 10. Still, months of unfavorable news reports produced enduring public belief in McPherson's wrongdoing.

== Claims of extramarital affairs ==
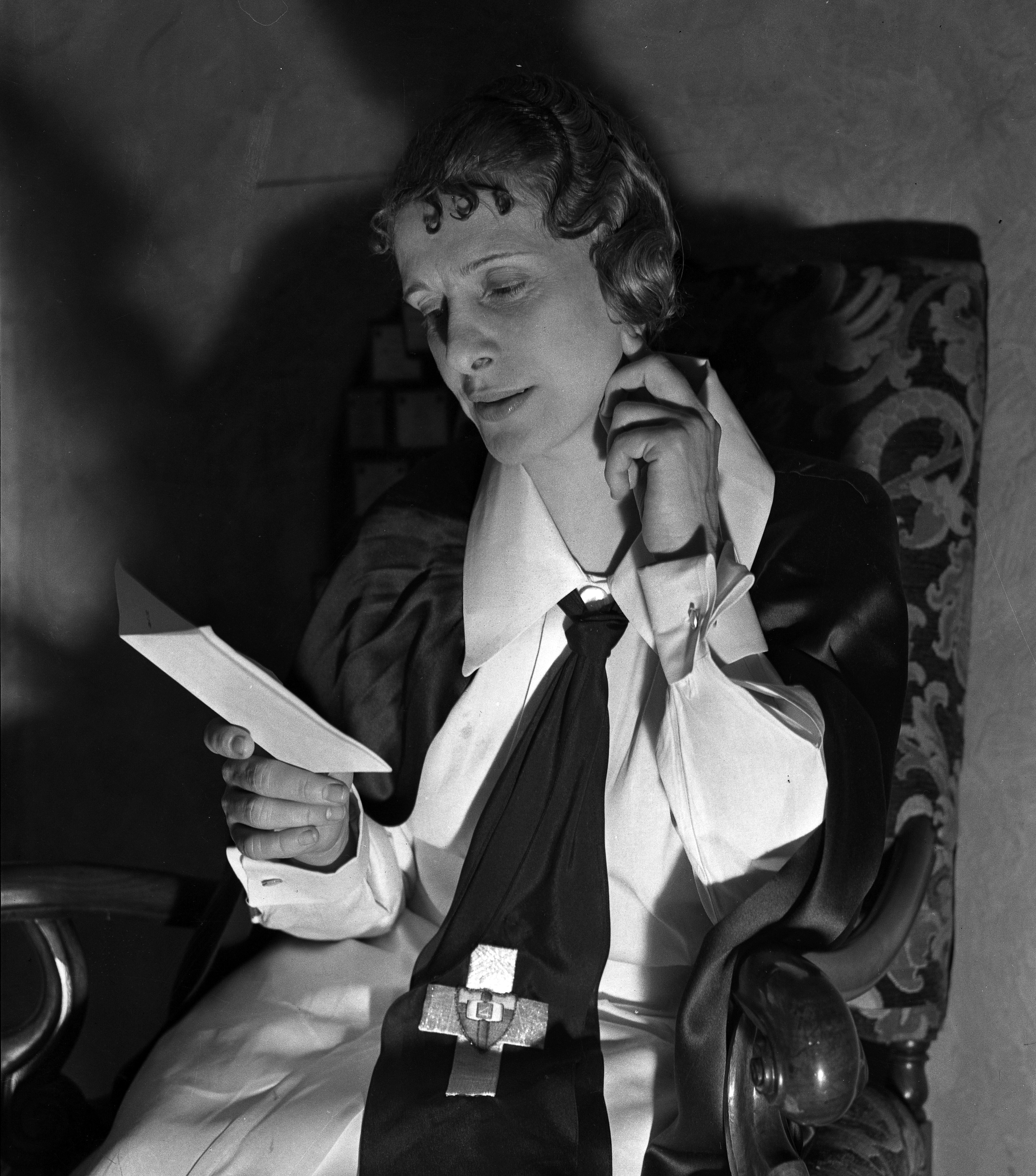
McPherson was the target of numerous unproven sexual allegations. This Los Angeles Times photograph from 1936 depicts the evangelist reading a note demanding $10,000 and threatening the release of nude motion pictures of her and a friend. McPherson stated that no such pictures were ever taken.

Allegations of love affairs directed against McPherson started during the 1926 kidnapping trial. Suspected lovers generally denied involvement. Alarmed by her style of dress and involvement with Hollywood, a Temple official hired detectives in 1929 to shadow McPherson. The detectives found no evidence of affairs. After McPherson's death, unsubstantiated allegations of affairs continued to emerge. Canadian journalist Gordon Sinclair claimed a 1934 affair in his autobiography. Another claim by comedian Milton Berle alleged a brief affair with the evangelist. Berle asserted that he met McPherson in Los Angeles where both were doing a charity show. Another book by Berle published during McPherson's life did not claim an affair. Biographer Matthew Sutton asserted that Berle's story of a crucifix in McPherson's bedroom was inconsistent with the frigidity of Pentecostal-Catholic relations during that era. Other contradictions in Milton Berle's story were noted as well. During that period, the evangelist's appearances and whereabouts could be traced almost every day from publications and church and travel records, and there was no record of the charity show Berle alleged; McPherson also had her own charities. Moreover, she was incapacitated with illness for five full months of that year. By 1931, McPherson kept herself chaperoned to guard against allegations.

== Later life and career ==
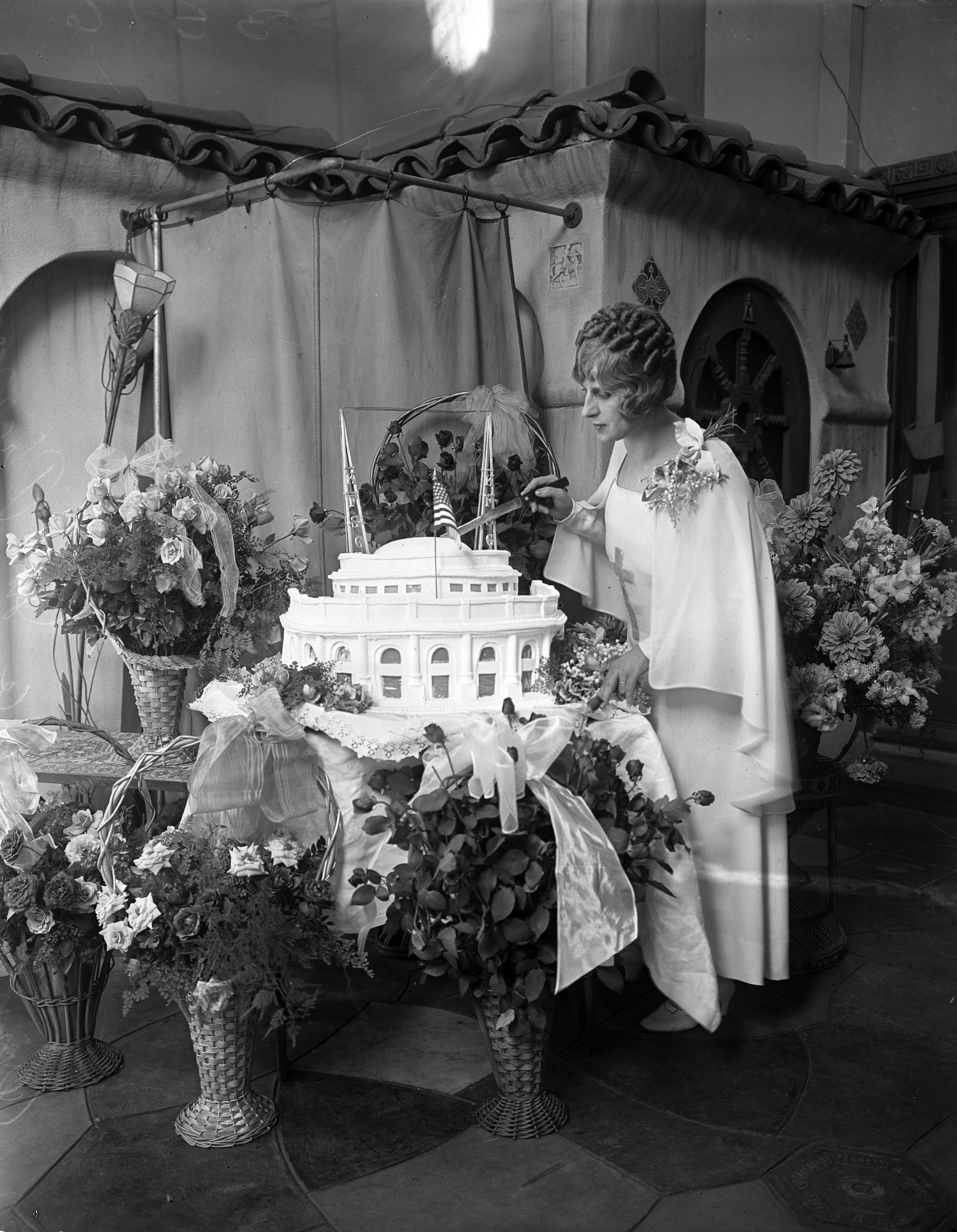
McPherson surrounded by flowers, cutting into Angelus Temple cake, 1929. She used her birthday, national holidays and other events as themes for church services and gala festivities.

=== Cinema ===
After the kidnapping, McPherson remained nationally famous and continued her ministry, but fell out of favor with the press. The media, which once dubbed her a "miracle worker", focused on disturbances in her household, including difficulties with her mother. Despite this, up to 10% of the population in Los Angeles held Temple membership, and movie studios competed to offer her contracts. Believing that film had the potential to transform Christianity, McPherson explored Hollywood culture and appeared in newsreels alongside Mary Pickford, Frances Perkins, and Franklin D. Roosevelt. She lost weight, cut and dyed her hair, began to wear makeup and jewelry, and became known for her stylish dress. This solicitation of fame was off-putting to some church members who preferred her former uniform of a navy cape over a white servant's dress.

In 1927, McPherson set out on a tour, taking advantage of the publicity from her kidnapping story to preach. She also traveled to England, Scotland, and Wales for five weeks of revival services. Press reports, depending upon the sources, described her audiences as either lacking enthusiasm or multitudes filling the altars anxiously awaiting a return visit. She even visited nightclubs, including Texas Guinan's speakeasy, where she addressed the crowd. Her visits to bars added to McPherson's notoriety: newspapers reported heavily on them, and rumors erroneously implied she was drinking, smoking, and dancing.

=== Problems with Mildred Kennedy ===
The cover of a prospectus for a Lake Tahoe land deal, an unsuccessful project. A subsequent lawsuit by investors drew unfavorable publicity and the attention of the district attorney's office.

Mildred Kennedy rejected McPherson's strategy of tearing down barriers between the secular and religious. In 1927, Kennedy left the Temple, along with other church members including 300 members of the choir. Attempting to curtail her daughter's influence, Kennedy initiated a staff-member confidence vote against McPherson but lost. The two had argued over management and McPherson's changing dress and appearance. Kennedy's administrative skills had been crucial to growing McPherson's ministry and maintaining Temple activities. A series of management staff replaced Kennedy, and the Temple became involved in various unsuccessful projects such as hotel building, cemetery plots, and land sales, plummeting into debt. In response to the difficulties, Kennedy returned in 1929, but because of continued disagreements with McPherson, resigned again in July 1930. The next month, McPherson had a physical and nervous breakdown. For 10 months, she was absent from the pulpit, diagnosed with acute acidosis.

=== Resurrection of her career ===
When McPherson returned, she introduced her "Attar of Roses" sermon, based on the Song of Solomon. In October 1931, she held a revival in Boston, a city with large Unitarian, Episcopalian, and Catholic populations, traditionally hostile to Pentecostal messages. On opening night, McPherson spoke to fewer than 5,000 in the 22,000-seat sports arena. The next day, her campaign's tone shifted and attendance climbed sharply. The final day of afternoon and evening services saw 40,000 attendees, exceeding the stadium venue's capacity and breaking attendance records.

McPherson's revival in New York City was less fruitful because of her sensationalistic reputation. McPherson went on to Washington, D.C., and Philadelphia and visited 21 states. A crew of musicians, scene designers, and costumers accompanied her. Her last national revival tour of 1933-1934 claimed two million persons heard 336 sermons.

The Boston Evening Traveller newspaper reported:

Aimee's religion is a religion of joy. There is happiness in it. Her voice is easy to listen to. She does not appeal to the brain and try to hammer religion into the heads of her audience... Fundamentally she takes the whole Bible literally, from cover to cover.

McPherson was not a radical literalist. She believed that the creation story in the Book of Genesis allowed great latitude of interpretation, and she did not insist on Young Earth creationism. In a meeting with students, McPherson heard an assertion that Christianity had outlived its usefulness. The encounter persuaded her to travel and gain new perspectives. In 1935, McPherson embarked on a six-month world tour, partly to study the women's movement in connection with India's independence struggle and to speak with Mahatma Gandhi, who gave her a sari made on his spinning wheel. Impressed by Gandhi, McPherson thought he might secretly lean toward Christianity. Other highlights included visiting Shwedagon Pagoda in Burma, hearing Benito Mussolini speak in Italy, and sitting on a wrecked military vehicle on a still-uncleared battlefield in Verdun, France.

In mid-1936, a delegation associated with the 1906 Azusa Street Revival, including African-American evangelist Emma Cotton, asked to use the Angelus Temple for its 30th anniversary celebration. Cotton and McPherson organized a series of meetings, also marking McPherson's re-identification with Pentecostalism. McPherson's experiments with celebrity had been less successful than she hoped, and alliances with other church groups were failing or defunct. Therefore, she looked to her spiritual origins and considered reintroducing Pentecostal elements into her public meetings. Temple officials were concerned that the Azusa people might bring "wildfire and Holy Rollerism".

Out of the Azusa Street Revival, African-American leaders and other minorities appeared on her pulpit, including African-American founder of the Churches of God in Christ Charles Harrison Mason, a significant Pentecostal leader. McPherson recommitted herself to the dissemination of "classic Pentecostalism", expressing concern that the Foursquare approach was in danger of becoming too "churchy". For the first time since the Temple opened, McPherson began to publicly speak in tongues.

=== Problems with the Temple ===
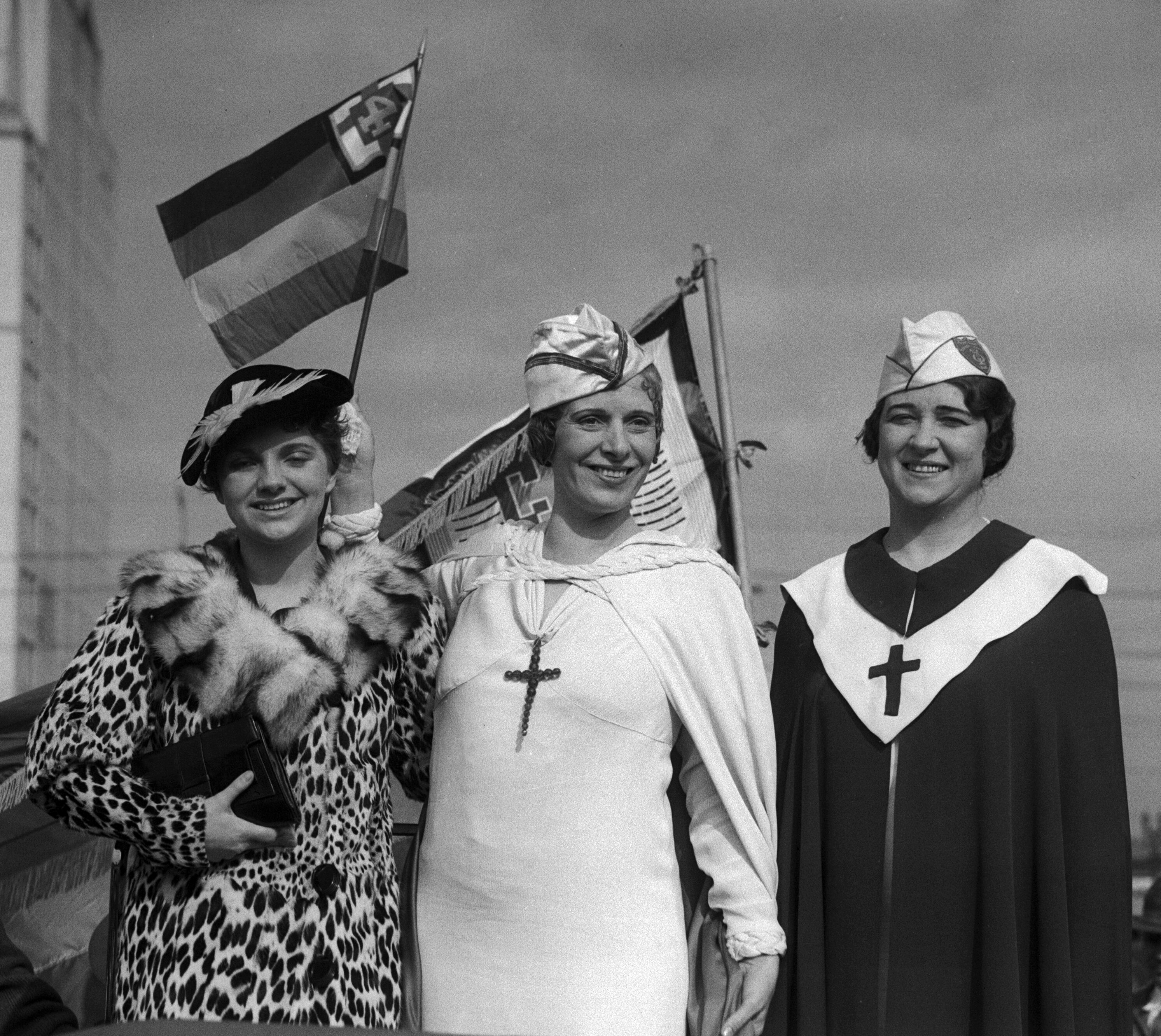
McPherson's daughter, Roberta Semple (left); McPherson (middle); and Rheba Crawford Splivalo, assistant pastor of Angelus Temple (right), at a parade in 1935

McPherson reassigned staff in an effort to address the Temple's financial difficulties. This worsened tensions among staff members. Rumors circulated that charismatic evangelist Rheba Crawford Splivalo, who had been working with McPherson for years, planned to take the Temple from her. McPherson asked Splivalo to "leave town". In the course of the staff controversy, McPherson's lawyer issued a strongly worded press release that upset Roberta Star Semple, McPherson's daughter, and led her to initiate a $150,000 slander lawsuit against him. Splivalo also sued McPherson for $1,080,000 because of alleged statements calling her a Jezebel and a Judas.

Semple's and Splivalo's lawsuits were unrelated, but McPherson saw both as part of the Temple takeover plot. Her mother sided with Roberta Semple, making unflattering statements about McPherson to the press. McPherson's defense in a public trial was dramatic and theatrical; she testified tearfully about how her daughter conspired against her. Her daughter's lawyer, meanwhile, mocked McPherson by imitating her mannerisms. The trial estranged McPherson from her daughter. The judge ruled for Semple, giving a $2,000 judgment in her favor, and she later relocated to New York. Splivalo and the Temple settled their suit out of court for the "cause of religion and the good of the community."

With Kennedy, Semple, and Splivalo gone, the Temple lost much of its leadership. McPherson found a new administrator in Giles Knight, who brought the Temple out of debt, disposed of 40 or so lawsuits, and eliminated spurious projects. He sequestered McPherson, allowed her to receive only a few personal visitors, and regulated her activities outside the Temple. This period was one of unprecedented creativity for McPherson: no longer distracted by reporters and lawsuits, she developed her illustrative sermon style. The irreligious Charlie Chaplin secretly attended her services, and she later consulted with Chaplin on ways to improve her presentations. McPherson's public image improved and previous critics praised her work. Robert P. Shuler, who had previously attacked McPherson, proclaimed that "Aimee's missionary work was the envy of Methodists". He also expressed his support of her Foursquare Church's 1943 application for admittance into the National Association of Evangelicals for United Action.

Her efforts toward interracial revival continued as she welcomed African-American people into the congregation and pulpit. While race riots burned Detroit in 1943, McPherson publicly converted former African-American heavyweight champion Jack Johnson on the Temple stage and embraced him.

== War years ==
In the 1930s, McPherson and the Foursquare Church espoused pacifism, a component of Pentecostalism. McPherson also espoused Gandhi's views on pacifism, and Clinton Howard, chairman of the World Peace Commission, was invited to speak at the Temple. In 1932, she advocated disarmament. Foursquare leaders, alarmed by rapid changes in military technology, drew up an amendment which was inclusive of varied opinions on military service. Two views were considered acceptable: the belief that people could bear arms in defense of a righteous cause and the belief that killing others, even during military service, would endanger people's souls. McPherson monitored international events leading up to the Second World War, believing that the apocalypse and the Second Coming of Christ were at hand.

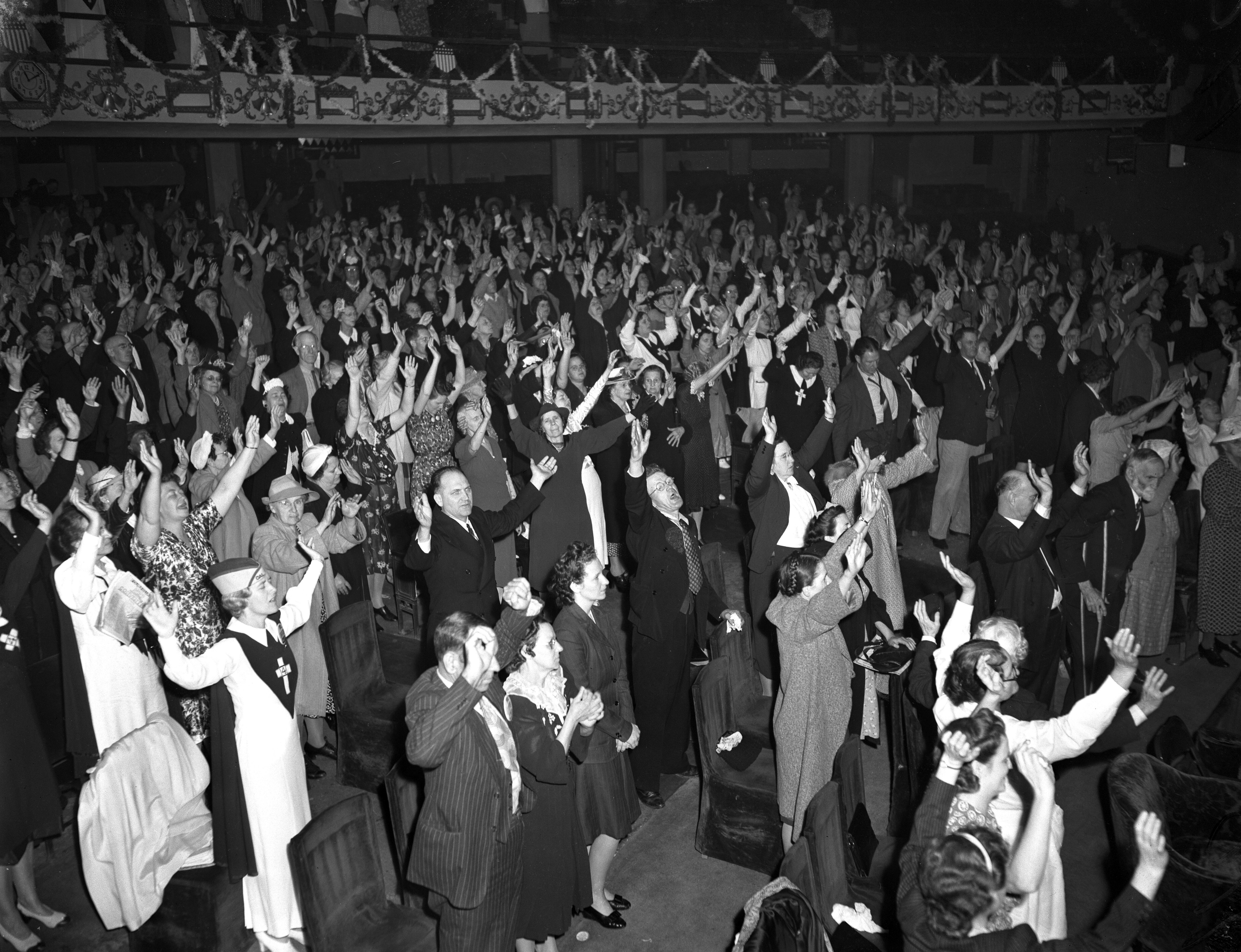
Congregation at Angelus Temple during fourteen-hour Holy Ghost service led by Aimee Semple McPherson, Los Angeles, Calif., 1942

All-night prayer meetings were held at the Temple starting in 1940 as Germany occupied Europe. She asked other Foursquare churches around the country to follow suit. She sent President Roosevelt's secretary, Stephen Early, an outline of her plans, and various officials expressed their appreciation, including the governor of California.

After the outbreak of World War II, McPherson rejected the Christian pacifism which was popular within the Pentecostal movement, saying, "It is the Bible against Mein Kampf. It is the cross against the swastika. It is God against the antichrist of Japan...This is no time for pacifism." The Temple became a symbol of homefront sacrifice for the war effort. Its white dome was painted black and its stained-glass windows covered in anticipation of air raids. To advertise the need to conserve gasoline and rubber, McPherson drove a horse and buggy to the Temple.

Rubber and other drives were organized, and unlimited airtime on her radio station was given to the Office of War Information. She asked listeners to donate two hours each day for such tasks as rolling bandages. Money was raised to provide military bases with comfortable furnishings and radios. Newsweek published a 1943 article about McPherson, "The World's Greatest Living Minister", noting that she had collected 2,800 pints of blood for the Red Cross; servicemen in her audience were honored, and she read the national anthem during services. McPherson gave visiting servicemen autographed Bibles. She wrote:

What a privilege it was to invite the servicemen present in every Sunday night meeting to come to the platform, where I greeted them, gave each one a New Testament, and knelt in prayer with them for their spiritual needs.

She insulted Adolf Hitler and Hideki Tōjō and she also became involved in war bond rallies. McPherson sold $150,000 worth of bonds in one hour in 1942, breaking previous records, then repeated the performance in 1944. The U.S. Treasury awarded her a special citation, and the U.S. Army made McPherson an honorary colonel. Her wartime activities included sermons linking the church and patriotism. She felt that if the Allies did not prevail, churches, homes, and everything dear to Christians would be destroyed.

McPherson's embrace of the United States' total war strategy left her open to some criticism. The belief that the church was monitoring the government by acting as an independent source of moral authority became blurred. She overlooked Japanese Americans' internment in relocation camps, and she refused to allow her denomination to support Christians who remained pacifist. Church members and Church leaders were expected to be willing to take up arms. In accordance with her proposal, the Foursquare Church eliminated the pacifist clause.

== Death ==
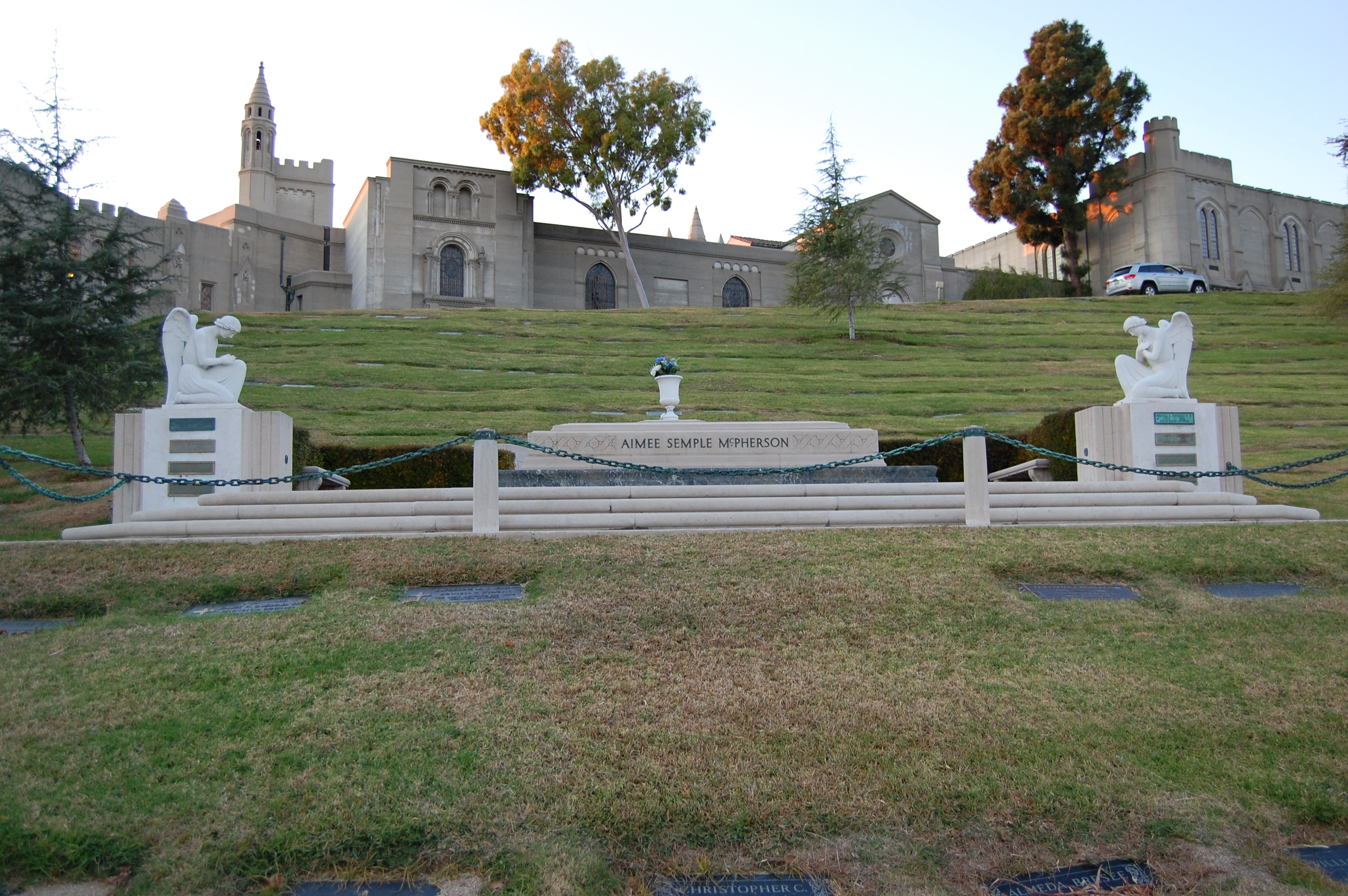
McPherson's grave

On September 26, 1944, McPherson went to Oakland, California, for a series of revivals, planning to preach her popular "Story of My Life" sermon. When her son went to her hotel room at 10:00 the next morning, he found her unconscious with pills and a half-empty bottle of capsules nearby. She was dead by 11:15. It was later discovered that she had called her doctor that morning complaining of feeling ill from the medicine, but he was in surgery. She then phoned another doctor who referred her to yet another physician. McPherson lost consciousness before the third physician could be contacted.

The autopsy revealed a heart attack likely caused by an overdose of sleeping pills, which she was taking following numerous health problems. Among the pills found in her room was the barbiturate secobarbital, a strong sedative that she had not been prescribed; it is unknown how she obtained the pills. Given the circumstances, there was speculation about suicide, but most sources generally agree the overdose was accidental.

Forty-five thousand people waited in long lines, some until 2 a.m., to file past the evangelist whose body lay in state for three days at the Temple. It later took 11 trucks to transport the $50,000 worth of flowers to the cemetery. Though they had left McPherson's employ on bad terms, her former assistant pastor Rheba Crawford Splivalo, McPherson's daughter Roberta, and her mother Mildred Kennedy also attended.

An observer, Marcus Bach, wrote:

A thousand ministers of the Foursquare Gospel paid their tearful tribute. The curious stood by impressed. The poor who had always been fed at Angelus were there, the lost who had been spirit-filled, the healed, the faithful here they were eager to immortalize the Ontario farm girl who loved the Lord.

Millions of dollars had passed through McPherson's hands during her life, but her personal estate amounted to only $10,000. Her daughter, Roberta, received $2,000; the remainder went to her son, Rolf. By contrast, her mother Mildred Kennedy had a 1927 severance settlement amounting to as much as $200,000 in cash and property; the Foursquare Church was worth $2.8 million.

McPherson is buried in Forest Lawn Memorial Park Cemetery in Glendale, California. Following her death, her son Rolf McPherson led the Foursquare Church denomination For 44 years.

== Legacy and influence ==
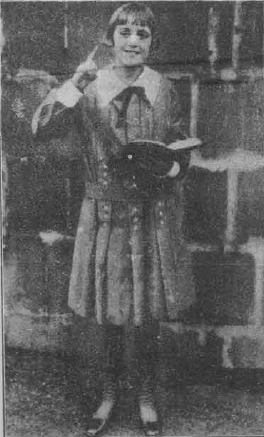
Uldine Utley, c. 1924

After her death, the largely negative aspect of her media image persisted and it also became the dominant factor which influenced much of the public's perception of McPherson. Shuler, whose caustic view of McPherson softened over the years, wrote that McPherson's flaws were many, yet she ultimately made a positive and lasting impact on Christianity. He recognized her appeal as a combination of identifying with average citizens and an ability to preach in simple terms. Her legacy continued through the thousands of ministers who she trained and the churches which they planted worldwide. McPherson contributed to the reshaping of evangelical Christianity, making it relevant to American culture and personally involving herself in the lives of listeners.

McPherson influenced later ministers such as the child preacher Uldine Utley and Edwin Louis Cole, who founded the Christian Men's Network. Biographer Matthew Sutton wrote that McPherson helped to forestall the replacement of traditional Protestantism by new scientific and philosophical ideas. Liberal Christianity, which was growing in the late 19th century, regarded Biblical miracles as superstition or metaphor. McPherson's faith-healing ministry promoted the idea that miraculous healings could occur in modern times.

McPherson's ecumenical approach was helpful to Pentecostals who attempted to share their faith by placing it in the context of historic church doctrine. Mainline churches were exposed to different beliefs about gifts of the Holy Spirit. They borrowed Pentecostal revival techniques, forerunning the Charismatic Movement.

McPherson challenged the expectations which American society had for women. Her gender and her divorces were particular sources of concern to many fundamentalist churches which she wanted to work with but the atheist Charles Lee Smith remarked that she had an extraordinary mind, "particularly for a woman".

Her continual work on church alliance-building bore posthumous fruit. Foursquare Gospel Church leaders joined the National Association of Evangelicals in 1952 and they also assisted in the organizing of the Pentecostal World Fellowship. Pentecostalism, which once advocated separatism and was on the fringes of Protestantism, became part of mainstream Christianity. The Foursquare church claimed a worldwide membership of over 7.9 million in 2019.

In 2019, Time created 89 new covers to celebrate women of the year starting from 1920; it chose McPherson for 1926.

== Portrayals ==
McPherson was the subject of or inspiration for numerous books, films, plays, and television shows. A musical titled AIMEE!, by Patrick Young and Bob Ashley, was produced in 1981 in Canada. Kathie Lee Gifford, David Friedman, and David Pomeranz wrote the biographical musical Scandalous: The Life and Trials of Aimee Semple McPherson, which was produced on Broadway in 2012, starring Carolee Carmello as McPherson. (An earlier version of this musical was titled Saving Aimee.) An Evangelist Drowns (2007), a one-woman play based on McPherson's life, includes fictionalized accounts of relationships with Charlie Chaplin and David Hutton. Spit Shine Glisten (2013), loosely based on the life of McPherson, was performed at the California Institute of the Arts in Valencia, Santa Clarita. The musical Vanishing Point, written by Rob Hartmann, Liv Cummins, and Scott Keys, intertwines the lives of evangelist McPherson, aviator Amelia Earhart, and mystery writer Agatha Christie. It was included in the 2010–2011 season at the Carnegie Mellon School of Drama in Pittsburgh.

A television film about the events surrounding McPherson's 1926 disappearance, The Disappearance of Aimee (1976), starred Faye Dunaway as McPherson and Bette Davis as her mother. Sister Aimee: The Aimee Semple McPherson Story, (2006), is a feature-length dramatic biographical film by Richard Rossi. The movie Sister Aimee (2019), starring Amy Hargreaves, is a fictional account of McPherson's disappearance. In 2020, two American television series featured characters based on McPherson: Sister Molly Finnister (Kerry Bishé) in Penny Dreadful: City of Angels and Sister Alice McKeegan (Tatiana Maslany) in Perry Mason.

Characters modeled on McPherson include Sharon Falconer in Sinclair Lewis's novel Elmer Gantry (played by Jean Simmons in the film adaptation), faith-healing evangelist Big Sister in Nathanael West's The Day of the Locust (played by Geraldine Page in the film adaptation) and corrupt small-town minister Eli Watkins in Upton Sinclair's novel Oil! (portrayed by Paul Dano in the novel's loose adaptation There Will Be Blood). The characters of Mrs. Melrose Ape in Evelyn Waugh's novel Vile Bodies and Reno Sweeney in Cole Porter's musical comedy Anything Goes are inspired by McPherson's habit of traveling with a troupe of young women who portrayed "angels" in her ministry events. Frank Capra's film The Miracle Woman (1931), starring Barbara Stanwyck, was based on John Meehan's play Bless You, Sister, which was reportedly inspired by McPherson's life.

The character of Edith Keeler portrayed by Joan Collins in the episode "The City on the Edge of Forever" from the television series Star Trek: The Original Series was inspired by McPherson. In their book These Are the Voyages: TOS, Season One, Marc Cushman and Susan Osborn note that Harlan Ellison (writer of "The City on the Edge of Forever") was reading a biography of McPherson while working on his script. This is backed up by Ellison himself, on page 77 of the published version of his original, unedited teleplay.

In 2025, the book Sister, Sinner, an exploration of McPherson's life by Claire Hoffman, was published. The book explores her life in two parts: before and after the purported kidnapping incident.

== Publications ==
- Declaration of Faith, The International Church of the Foursquare Gospel (1920)
- Aimee Semple McPherson (1921). The Second Coming of Christ: Is He Coming? How Is He Coming? When Is He Coming? For Whom Is He Coming?. A. McPherson. OCLC 8122641.
- Aimee Semple McPherson (1923) [1919]. This is That: Personal Experiences, Sermons and Writings of Aimee Semple McPherson, Evangelist. The Bridal Call Publishing House. OCLC 1053806.
- Aimee Semple McPherson (1927). In the Service of the King: The Story of My Life. Boni and Liveright. OCLC 513458.
- Perfection, Can a Christian Be Perfect?, Echo Park Evangelistic Association (1930)
- Aimee Semple McPherson (1936). Give Me My Own God. H. C. Kinsey & Company, Inc. OCLC 1910039.
- Aimee Semple McPherson (1951). The Story of My Life: In Memoriam, Echo Park Evangelistic Association, Los Angeles. OCLC 1596212.

== See also ==
- Elmer Gantry (film)
- List of kidnappings (1900–1949)
- List of solved missing person cases (pre-1950)
- Scandalous: The Life and Trials of Aimee Semple McPherson, a 2012 Broadway musical
