= Roberta Semple Salter =

American evangelist (1910–2007)

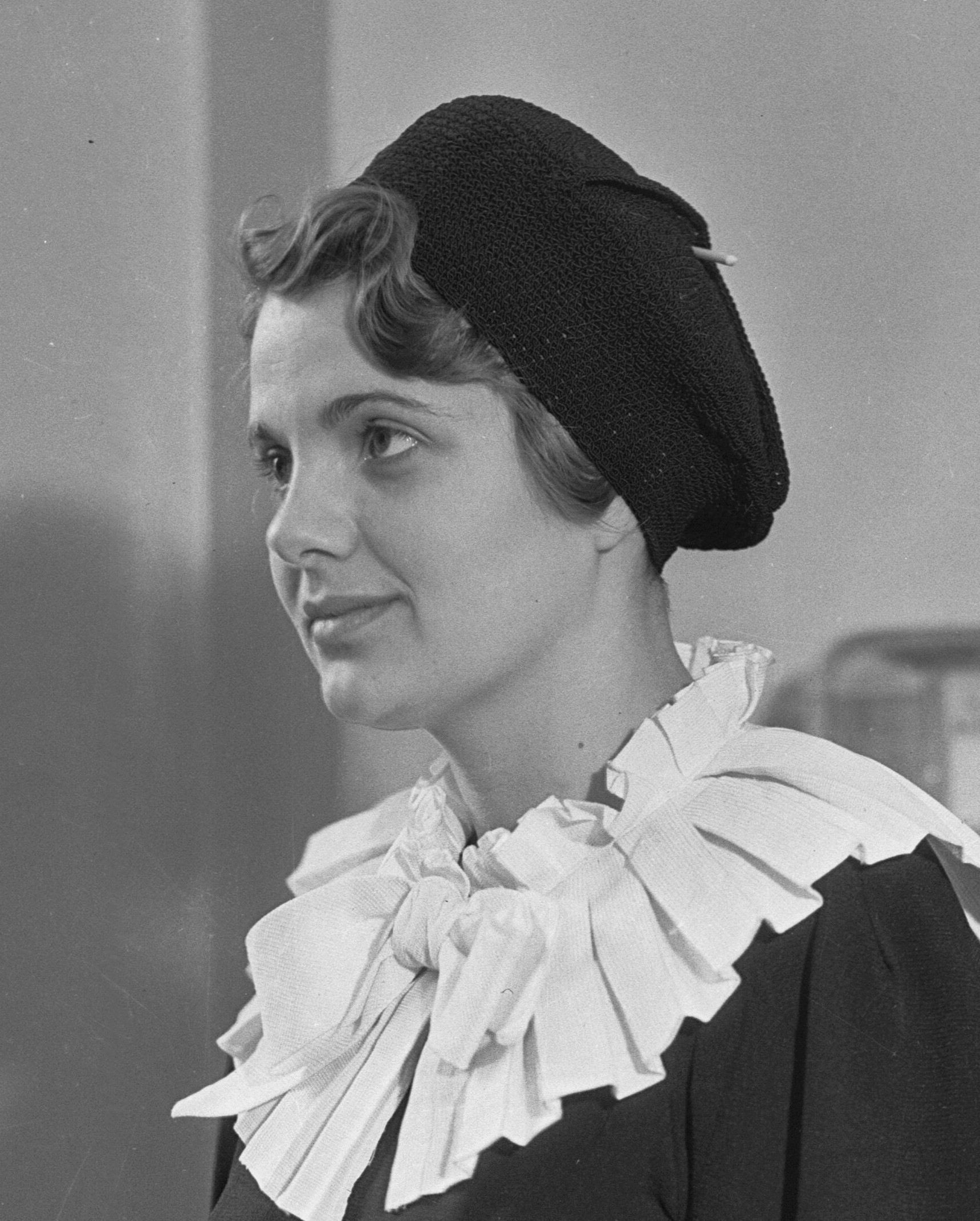
Salter in the 1930s.

Roberta Semple Salter (September 17, 1910 – January 25, 2007) was the daughter of evangelist Aimee Semple McPherson and half-sister to Aimee's other child, Rolf McPherson. Roberta was the original heir to her mother's ministry, which was later taken over by Rolf.

== Early life ==
Salter was born Roberta Star Semple at Matilda Hospital in Hong Kong, where her mother and father, Robert James Semple, were doing missionary work. Robert died of dysentery and malaria on August 19, 1910, 1 week after the couple's 2nd wedding anniversary; Roberta was born 29 days later. Her mother named her "Roberta" in her father's memory and "Star" because she had brightened what Aimee perceived to be a grim future.

After Roberta's birth, Aimee boarded a ship bound for the United States, reconnecting with her mother, Mildred, in New York City, who got her a job with the Salvation Army. Aimee met then married accountant Harold McPherson, who moved his new family to Providence, Rhode Island, where their son and Roberta's half-brother Rolf was born. Aimee ultimately left McPherson, taking the children with her to her native Canada, where she launched her ministry. After 7 years of traveling throughout North America, Aimee decided to settle in Los Angeles to give both the ministry a home base and Roberta and Rolf stability.

Roberta inherited her mother's "brilliant smile," biographer Daniel Mark Epstein noted in his 1993 book Sister Aimee. She led children's services at her mother's revivals. Roberta also hosted a radio program and wrote a youth column, "Aunt Birdie", for the church newspaper.

== Adulthood ==
At the age of 21, Roberta fell in love with a ship's purser while accompanying her mother on a crusade. The young couple married in Singapore, but the marriage only lasted three years.

By age 24, Roberta had become vice president of her mother's Church of the Foursquare Gospel. A few years later, she sued her mother's attorney for slander. The two-week trial ended with a ruling in the daughter's favor.

Roberta's status as her mother's heir ended when she was removed from the church's leadership in 1937.

Roberta's daughter said her mother and grandmother remained in contact following the legal battle, despite reports to the contrary. Roberta continued to provide financial support to the Church of the Foursquare Gospel, according to her daughter.

Roberta was prevented from attending her mother's funeral in 1944 by military priorities during World War II. She attempted to fly from New York to Los Angeles for the memorial service at Angelus Temple and Forest Lawn, but was bumped from the flight in Chicago when seats were appropriated for military personnel.

== Commercial broadcasting ==
Following the trial, Roberta was invited to be a guest on an NBC radio program, Hobby Lobby. She later was hired as researcher for the show, which featured celebrities and their hobbies.

In 1941, Roberta married Harry Salter, music director of Hobby Lobby, and the couple had a daughter. The two later developed radio and television game shows such as Stop the Music and Name That Tune.

== Death ==
Roberta died in New York City on January 25, 2007, at age 96. Her death was attributed to natural causes.
