= Emma Cotton =

Popular 20th-century evangelist (1877 – 1952)

Emma Cotton (1877 – December 27, 1952) was an evangelist and preacher born of Creole descent in the U.S. state of Louisiana. She first appeared in history in 1906 during the Azusa Street Revival. She was the founder of the Azusa Temple as well as other Pentecostal churches across the United States. Cotton's preaching and involvement in the Pentecostal circuit, as well as her friendship with famous evangelist, Aimee Semple McPherson, paved the way for women in church leadership in the 1900s.

== Life in Pentecostalism ==
=== Azusa Street Revival ===
Cotton was inspired by "the great awakening of the Spirit." At the revival, she stated she was healed of weak lungs and cancer that was found in her nose. After her conversion, Cotton frequently referred to herself as "a walking drug store" while many others called her "Sister Cotton". She soon met her husband, Henry C. Cotton, who worked as a railway cook on a run between Los Angeles and San Antonio While Henry was away on work, Cotton was available to participate in evangelistic work around California. Cotton and her husband returned to Louisiana for a period before she was appointed Assistant State Mother of California for her church by Lizzie Robinson. Returning to California, Sister Cotton held a variety of church services all across the state. She held divine healing services at the Pentecostal Assembly in San Jose in 1916 followed by the establishment of multiple Pentecostal churches in Bakersfield, Fresno, and Oakland.

=== Azusa Temple ===
By 1920, Cotton had stepped down from her role as Church Mother to become a full-time pastor for her own church, the Azusa Temple, in Los Angeles. Together, Emma and Henry co-pastored the church through the Church of God in Christ (COGIC) but remained independent as a church due to COGIC's decision to not ordain women. Today, the church is known as Crouch Memorial Church, named after one of Cotton's proteges, Samuel Crouch. To this day the church is an active congregation affiliated with COGIC.

== Friendship with Aimee Semple McPherson ==
During the 1930s, Cotton become close friends with Aimee Semple McPherson while holding many Pentecostal church services together. McPherson was frequently known to only allow a small number of women to preach at her church, the Angelus Temple. In 1936, Mother Cotton asked McPherson to host a 30th anniversary party to commemorate the Azusa Street beginnings. It was described in fliers as "a great getting together that we might be renewed in the old-time Spirit and power." Cotton was asked to speak at the gathering in order to address the crowds at the Angelus Temple. It was there that she encouraged the temple towards unity and warned against sectarian interests that were starting to rise. This gathering was considered a great success and eventually turned into a six-month event in which Cotton and her husband preached to their followers.

== Legacy ==
By April 1939, Cotton had edited and published a paper called "The Inside Story of the Outpouring of the Holy Spirit - Azusa Street - April 1906." Its only appearance was in a volume of Message of the Apostolic Faith, a newsletter written by Cotton that was meant to be the beginning of a regular series. This included detailed accounts of her eyewitness accounts of events surrounding the Azusa Street Revival as well as an emphasis on the role of women in the church. While many accounts focus on the prominence of men in leadership, Cotton wrote about the importance of Lucy Farrow and Julia Hutchins in the success of the revival.

Cotton is also credited with songwriting credits including a gospel favorite, "John Saw That Number." Some historians also credit her with authorship of the famous, "When the Saints Go Marching In," although that has never been fully corroborated.

Cotton's bout of cancer returned in 1950 after nearly half a century of reprieve. She died on December 27, 1952, followed by Henry in 1959. They are both buried in Lincoln Memorial Park in Compton, California.
