= Rheba Crawford =

American religious leader

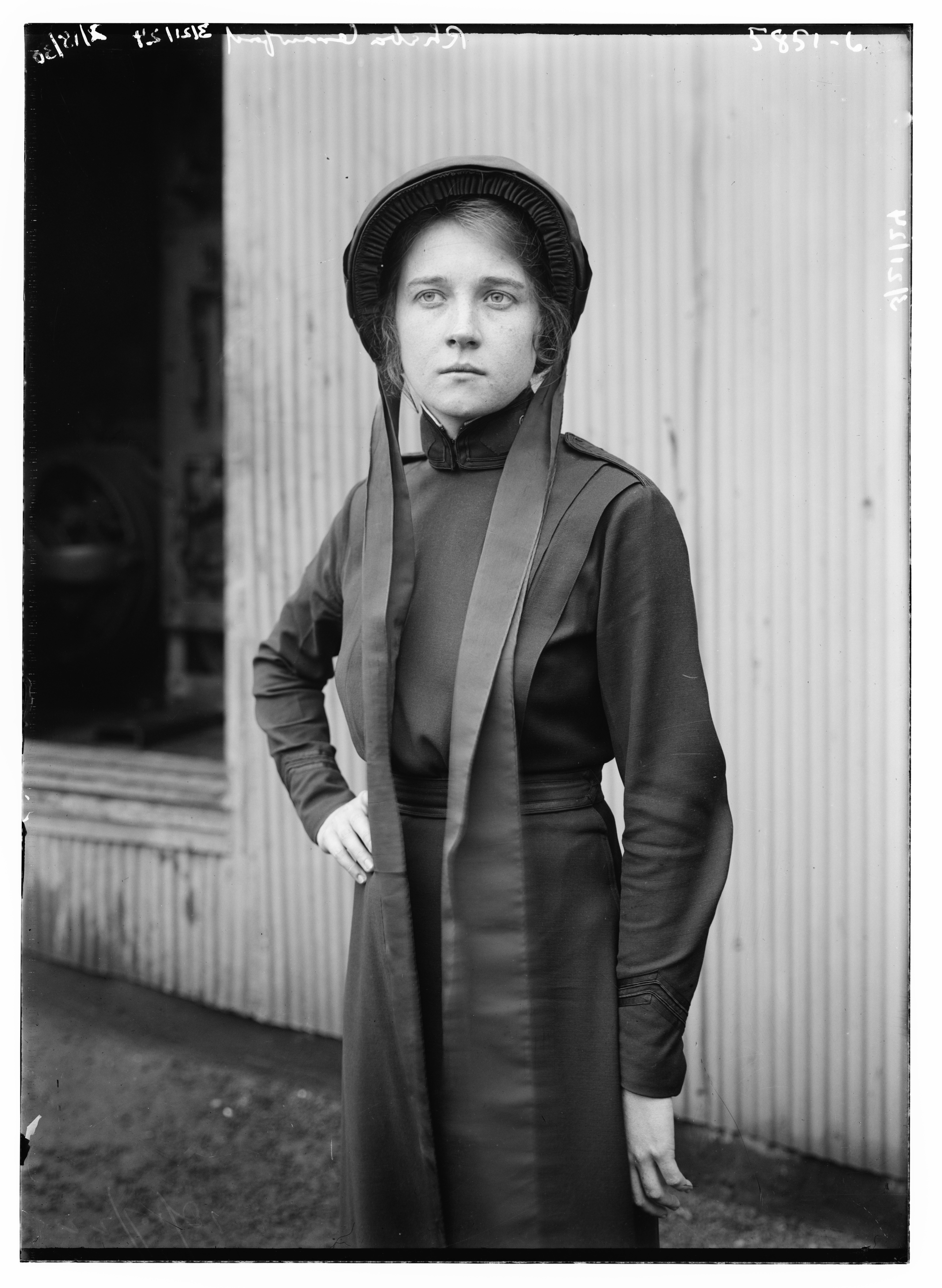
- Rheba Crawford, from the Library of Congress
- Born: Irene Rebecca Crawford; February 14, 1898; Milwaukee, Wisconsin
- Died: January 7, 1966 (aged 67); Los Angeles, California
- Occupations: Social worker, evangelist

Irene Rebecca "Rheba" Crawford (February 14, 1898 – January 7, 1966), known as "the Angel of Broadway", was an American Christian religious figure and social worker. She was associate pastor of the Angelus Temple in Los Angeles. Her romances and her bitter rivalry with head pastor Aimee Semple McPherson were covered in newspapers nationwide. "Publicity pursued her," commented a 1948 profile, "and she never ran away from it very fast."

== Early life ==
Crawford was born in Milwaukee, Wisconsin, the daughter of Andrew Crawford and Isabella Clark Crawford. Both parents were active in the Salvation Army, a Christian denomination aligned with the Wesleyan-holiness movement. Her mother died in 1903, and her father remarried. She was raised mainly in Georgia and California, and she attended school in Sacramento.

== Career ==
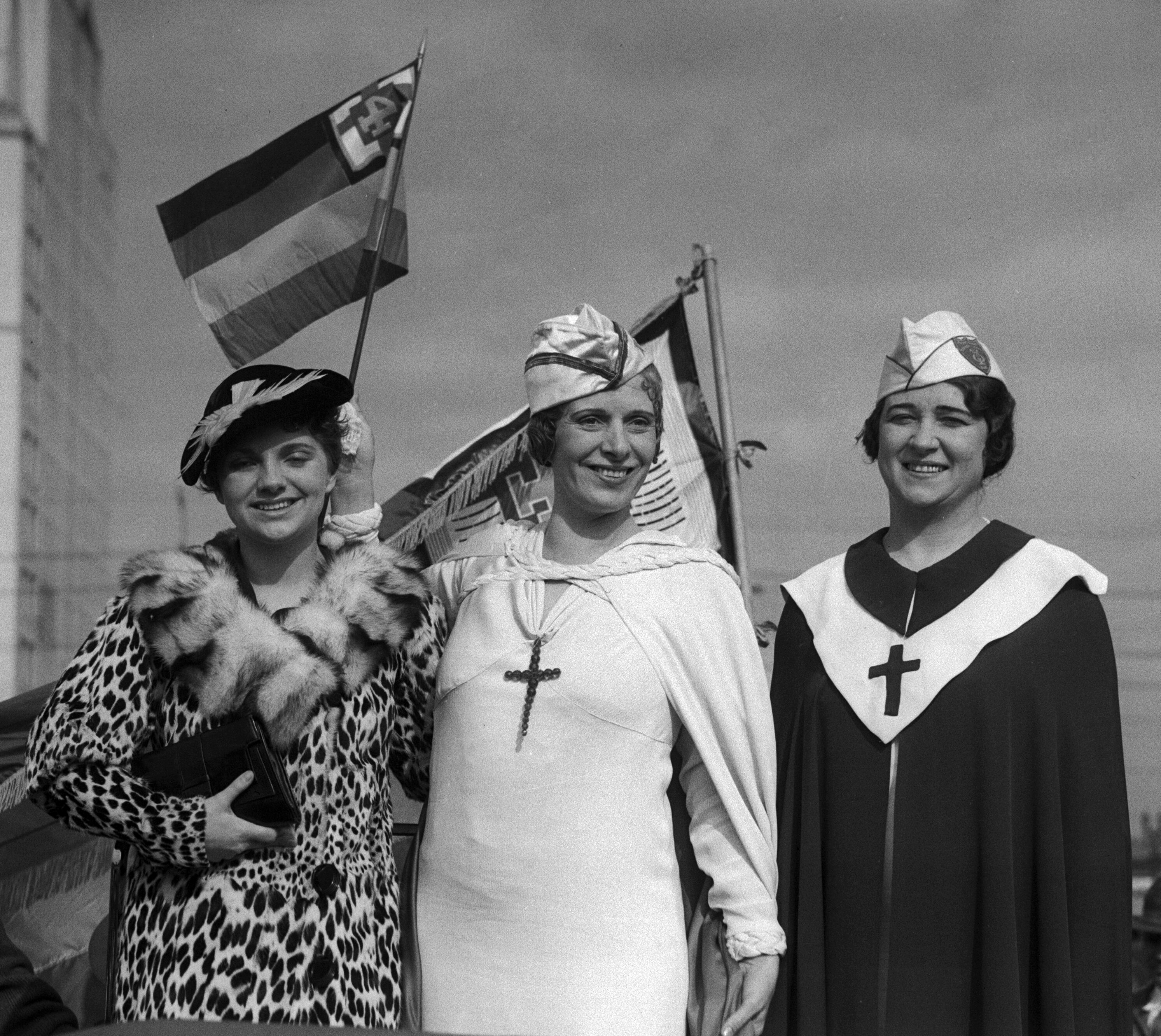
Roberta Semple, Aimee Semple McPherson, and Rheba Crawford in a 1935 parade

Crawford was briefly a reporter at the Atlanta Constitution as a young woman. In the 1920s, she edited the Salvation Army publication The Young Soldier, at the church's national headquarters in New York, and was called "the Angel of Broadway" because she was a constant and striking presence at prohibition and moral hygiene rallies in Times Square. After she was arrested in 1922 for blocking traffic, she resigned from Salvation Army work. The character of Sarah Brown in the 1950 musical Guys and Dolls is based in part on Crawford in these years.

Crawford was appointed director of the California State Department of Social Welfare in 1931, and held office until 1934, when she became assistant pastor at the Angelus Temple. She became a popular if controversial preacher from the Angelus pulpit, and gave "reckless, explosive" political sermons on local radio broadcasts. Her work supporting Angelus head pastor Aimee Semple McPherson soon became contentious, and by 1937 the pair exchanged multiple public accusations of libel, slander, blackmail and defamation, in what Time magazine called "an ugly squabble". McPherson settled with Crawford, out of court, for an undisclosed sum. Crawford founded a new church in 1936, with plans for expansion.

In her later years, Crawford worked with the Los Angeles County Department of Senior Citizens Affairs.

== Personal life ==
Crawford married three times. Her first husband was a newspaper publisher, John Harold Sommers; they married in 1924 and divorced in 1928. Her second husband was stockbroker Raymond Bachelder Splivalo; they married in 1930, and he died in 1937. Her third husband was rancher Arthur Lawrence Lambertz; they married in 1948. She died from meningitis in 1966, aged 67 years, in Los Angeles. Her grave is in Inglewood Park Cemetery in California.
