= Rolf McPherson =

Denominational leader; clergy (1913–2009)

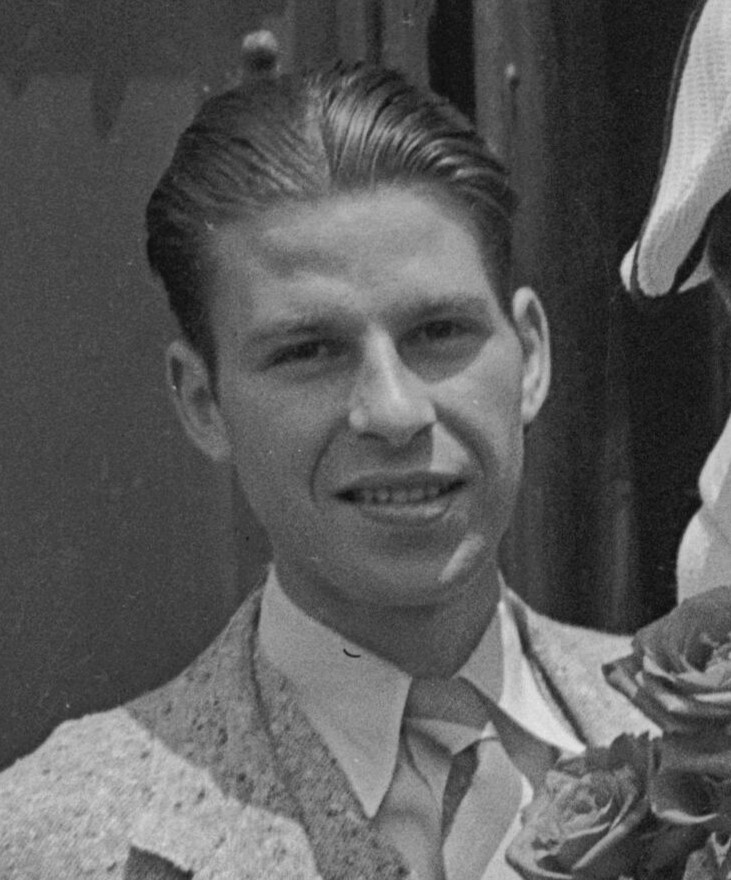
McPherson in 1935.

Rolf Potter Kennedy McPherson (March 23, 1913 – May 21, 2009) was the pastor of Angelus Temple and president of the International Church of the Foursquare Gospel, serving in that capacity from 1944 to 1988. By his retirement, the evangelical Pentecostal denomination had grown from 29,000 members in 410 churches to 1.2 million members in more than 19,000 churches located in 63 countries.

== Personal background ==
Rolf McPherson was born on March 23, 1913, in Providence, Rhode Island. He was the son of Harold Stewart McPherson and Aimee Semple McPherson, founder of the International Church of the Foursquare Gospel. He was the half-brother of Roberta Star Semple, the daughter of Aimee and her first husband Robert James Semple, who had died of malaria one month before the birth of his daughter. Rolf and his sister Roberta were part of many services and revivals when young. McPherson attended college, first studying engineering. He switched to religion in 1930 after his mother became ill, and also completed divinity school, earning a doctorate.

McPherson began his career as a preacher. His mother groomed him to take over Foursquare after a management dispute resulted in Roberta being ousted from church leadership. After his mother's death in 1944, and for the next 44 years, McPherson led the denomination, headquartered at Angelus Temple, and brought it into the evangelical mainstream, which supported its tremendous development in the United States and expansion internationally.

He retired in 1988. After retirement, he continued to attend church every week, serving in congregational ministry. He resigned from all church duties in 1997. He died on May 21, 2009, at his home in Los Feliz at age 96, having been predeceased by his first wife, Lorna Dee Smith McPherson. His second wife and widow, Evangeline Otto Carmichael, was the ex-wife of composer Ralph Carmichael.
