= Harry Salter =

American music director and orchestra conductor

- Born: 1899; New York, USA
- Died: March 5, 1984 (aged 85); Mamaroneck, New York
- Spouse: Roberta Semple Salter
- Children: 1
- Military career
- Allegiance: United States
- Branch: Special Services Division
- Rank: Captain
- Conflicts: World War II

Harry Salter (1899 – March 5, 1984) was an American music director and an orchestra conductor for radio and television programs. One of Salter's radio orchestras in the late 1920s had as members Tommy and Jimmy Dorsey, Artie Shaw, Gene Krupa and Jack Teagarden.

== Radio and television ==
Salter led the orchestra for Your Unseen Friend, Mr. District Attorney, Honolulu Bound, What's My Name?, Hobby Lobby, Pot o' Gold and Harry Salter and His Band Box Revue, a series of transcribed syndicated programs that were "placed on various stations."

Salter created Name That Tune and was co-producer of Stop the Music. (Another source credits Salter as being the creator of Stop the Music.)

He was the orchestra leader for such radio shows as the Hit Parade, Your Unseen Friend, Philco Show, Musical Grocery Store, and Hobby Lobby. He also conducted for performers such as Lanny Ross and Milton Berle.

Salter was also the creator, executive producer and orchestra conductor for the TV show Name That Tune from 1952 to 1959, and was the creator and musical director of Stop the Music on both radio and television, which was broadcast on radio from 1948 to 1949 and became a one-hour TV show on ABC from May 1949 to April 1952, then came back again as a half-hour show from September 7, 1954, to June 14, 1956.

== Military service ==
During World War II, Salter was a captain in the U.S. Army's Special Services Division. His responsibilities included being music director for the radio program The Army Service Forces Present, and later he headed the musical production section of the Special Service Forces.

== Personal life ==
Salter was born in New York. He had two brothers, Louis and Bert, and a sister named Sylvia Werner. He was married to Roberta Semple Salter. The two later developed many musical shows on television. The couple had one daughter, Victoria. He died in a nursing home in Mamaroneck, New York at the age of 85.
