= KFSG (Los Angeles) =

Radio station in Los Angeles, California (1924-1961)

KFSG was a Los Angeles AM radio station, founded in 1924. The station was non-commercial, and programming was primarily religious. It was deleted in July 1961, in order to allow its timeshare partner, KRKD, to expand to fulltime operation.

== History ==
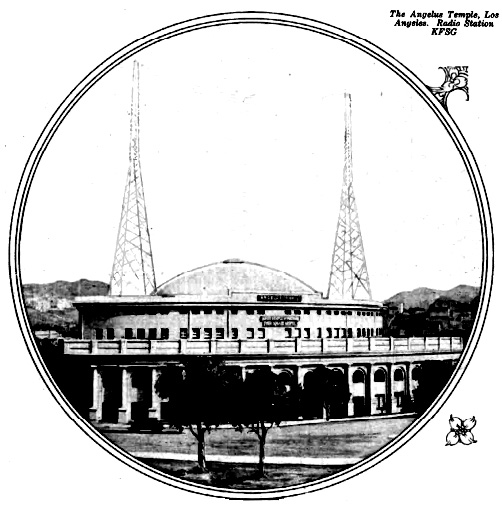
The station was originally located at the Angelus Temple, with the transmitting antenna strung between two towers constructed atop the building.

KFSG was first licensed in January 1924 to the Echo Park Evangelistic Association at 1100 Glendale Blvd., for 500 watts at 1080 kHz. The person responsible for its establishment was evangelist Aimee Semple McPherson. Although tentatively assigned the call letters KFNC from an alphabetical list, this was changed to KFSG, standing for "Kall Foursquare Gospel", at McPherson's request.

The station cost $25,000 to build, and featured a state-of-the-art 500 watt Western Electric transmitter. The transmitting antenna was strung between twin towers constructed on the roof of McPherson's Angelus Temple. A glass enclosed operating room, and Gray Room studio, were located beneath the towers on the building's top floor. KFSG made its debut broadcast on February 6.

In early 1925, KFSG was reassigned to 1090 kHz. This was changed to 1190 kHz in early 1928. With the November 11, 1928 implementation of the Federal Radio Commission's General Order 40, it was assigned to 1120 kHz, sharing this frequency with KMIC in Inglewood.

A 1931 review listed one of its slogans as the "Glory Station of the Pacific Coast", with a 41-hour weekly schedule. In March 1941, the North American Regional Broadcasting Agreement moved KFSG and its timesharing partner, now KRKD, to 1150 kHz. After McPherson's death in 1944, Dr. Harold Wesley Jeffries was placed in charge of the radio station.

In early 1961, ownership of KRKD was transferred to the International Church of the Foursquare Gospel. KFSG ceased operation and its broadcast license was cancelled July 1961, in order to allow full-time operation by KRKD.

== "Minions of Satan" telegram ==
Radio in the United States was regulated by the Department of Commerce from 1912 until the formation of the Federal Radio Commission in 1927. Herbert Hoover was the Commerce secretary from 1921 until 1928. In a section of his memoirs, published in 1952, he recounted an anecdote about a telegram which was said to have been sent by McPherson, which was quoted as saying "Please order your minions of Satan to leave my station alone. You cannot expect the Almighty to abide by your wavelength nonsense. When I offer my prayers to Him I must fit into His wave reception. Open this station at once."

However, the accuracy of this account has been questioned. Hoover's review does not include a copy of the telegram, and is undated. It states that McPherson's "small" station had a long history of operating outside of its assigned frequency, and the telegram was in response to the station being shut down by the local inspector. However, extensive research by Jim Hilliker was unable to verify any of Hoover's details, including no evidence that KFSG had ever operated outside of its assigned frequency, or had ever been shut down.
