= Uldine Utley =

American child preacher (1912–1995)

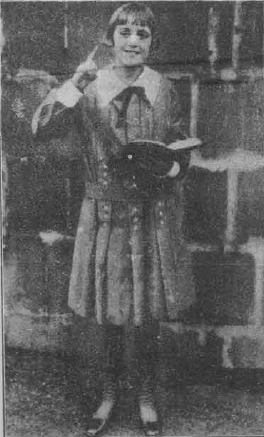
- Uldine Utley, from a 1924 publication
- Born: March 16, 1912; Durant, Oklahoma
- Died: October 31, 1995 (aged 83); San Bernardino, California
- Other names: Uldine Langkop

Uldine Mabelle Utley (March 16, 1912 – October 31, 1995) was an American Pentecostal child preacher.

== Early life ==
Utley was born in Durant, Oklahoma, the daughter of Azle Herbert Utley and Hattie Ellen Bray Utley. Her father was an electrician, and a farmer and postmaster while the family lived in Colorado.

== Preaching career ==
Utley had a conversion experience in 1921, inspired by the preaching of Aimee Semple McPherson while she was living in Fresno, California. Within two years Utley was preaching across the United States, and at the age of fourteen she preached to a crowd of 14,000 people at Madison Square Garden. During Utley's appearances at the Chicago World's Fair in 1933, during a heatwave, her program was promoted as having "cooled air" and comfortable seats.

In 1935, she was ordained by the Methodist Episcopal Church. Utley was called "the Joan of Arc of the modern religious world". She was also called a "second Billy Sunday" and, as a young woman, "the ingenue of evangelism" and "the Garbo of the pulpit".

== Later life ==
She married salesman Wilbur Eugene Langkop in 1938. Uldine was committed to a mental hospital shortly after her marriage, and they eventually divorced. Utley spent the rest of her life in and out of mental institutions. She died in 1995, at the age of 83, in San Bernardino, California. A biography of Utley was published in 2016.
