= Drive (charity) =

Charitable event for the donation of items

In charitable organizations, a drive is a collection of items for people who need them, such as clothing, used items, books, canned food, cars, etc. Some drives ask that people go through their inventory, bag the items up, and put them in a giveaway bin, or charitable organizations such as Big Brothers Big Sisters, The Salvation Army come to the house and pick them up. They then put the items in their thrift stores or, if they don't have any, sell them to thrift stores to raise money for their organization.

== Used clothing drives ==
A used clothing drive is philanthropic activity that requests clothing donations from community members or a network of individuals for the benefit of a non profit group or group of vulnerable people. There are many benefits to organizing a used clothing drive. Used clothing drives divert waste from landfills by giving people an alternative disposal method for unwanted, ripped or stained items. Only 15% of textiles are recycled. Nearly 95% of textiles worn or torn can be recycled. A used clothing drive can be a fundraising effort for organizations or groups that lack funding such as, Schools, Religious organizations, clubs, Sports Teams and Associations, neighborhoods and, communities. Donated Items can be given for free to the needy.

The most popular ways to organize a used clothing drive are: 1. To collect clothing for donation directly to people in need of the specific items. 2. To collect clothing for sale to non profit organization who will use the resale profits to benefit established community charity initiatives for people who are struggling with addiction, in need of food or shelter, education programs and work experience programs. This method can also be used as a group fundraising effort.

There are many resources on the internet to help groups and clubs organize used clothing drives. These resources provide tips tools and ideas for generating interest and engagement to ensure successful outcomes.
