= Angelus Temple =

Church in Los Angeles, California, US

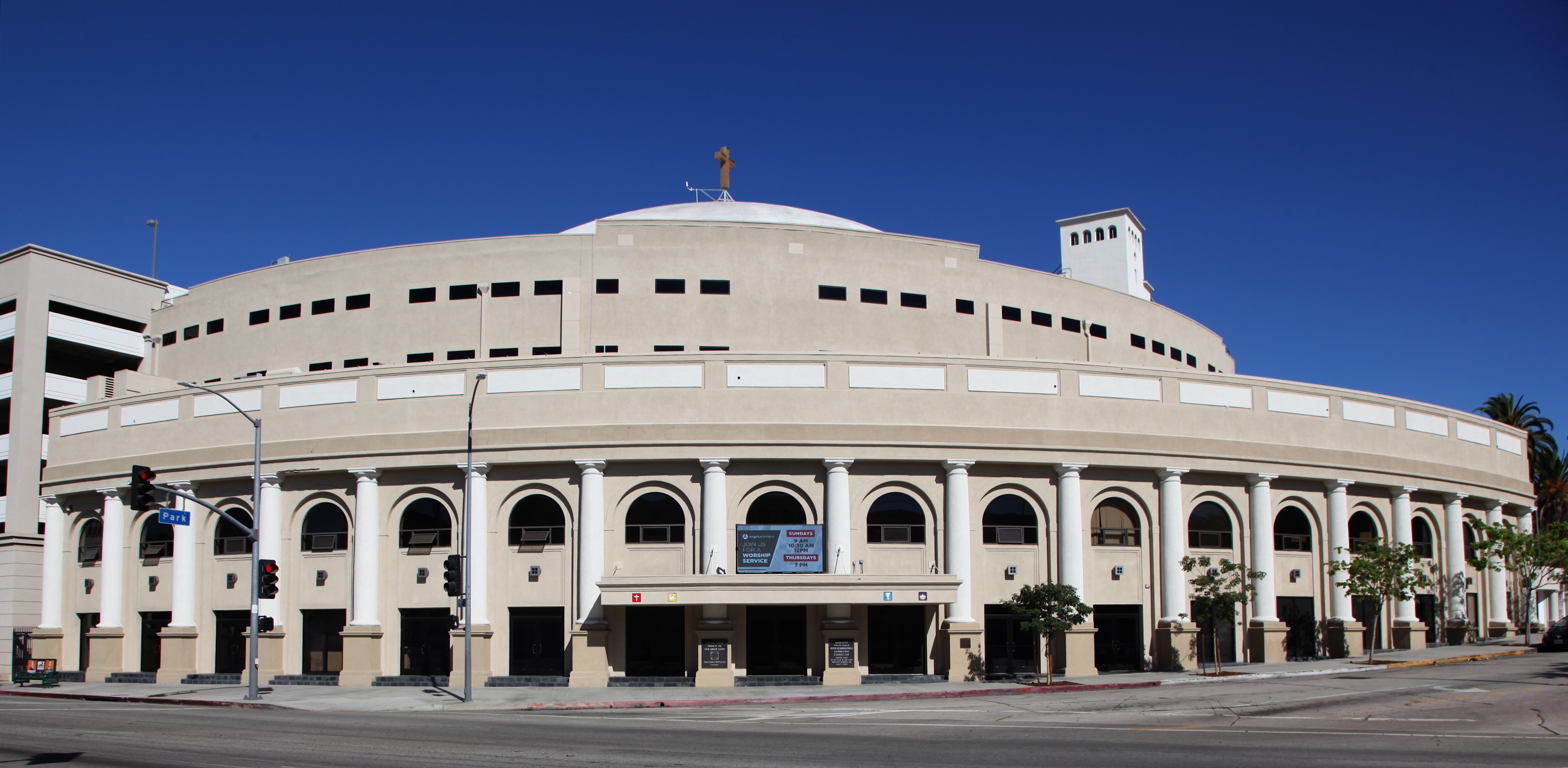
- Angelus Church in 2010
- Angelus Temple
- Location: Los Angeles, California
- Country: United States
- Denomination: Pentecostal
- Website: angelustemple.org

History
- Founded: 1923
- Founder: Aimee Semple McPherson
- Angelus Temple
- U.S. National Register of Historic Places
- U.S. National Historic Landmark
- Location within the Los Angeles metropolitan area Location within California
- Location: 1100 Glendale Blvd., Los Angeles, California
- Coordinates: 34°04′35″N 118°15′36″W
- Area: less than one acre
- Architect: Brook Hawkins
- Architectural style: Modern Movement
- NRHP reference No.: 92001875

Significant dates
- Added to NRHP: April 27, 1992
- Designated NHL: April 27, 1992

Angelus Temple is a Pentecostal megachurch in the Echo Park district of Los Angeles, California, United States. Founded by Aimee Semple McPherson in 1923, it is considered the first U.S. megachurch.

Today, it is affiliated with the Foursquare Church and led by Senior Pastors Brad and Stella Reed. In 2015, the weekly attendance was 8,975.

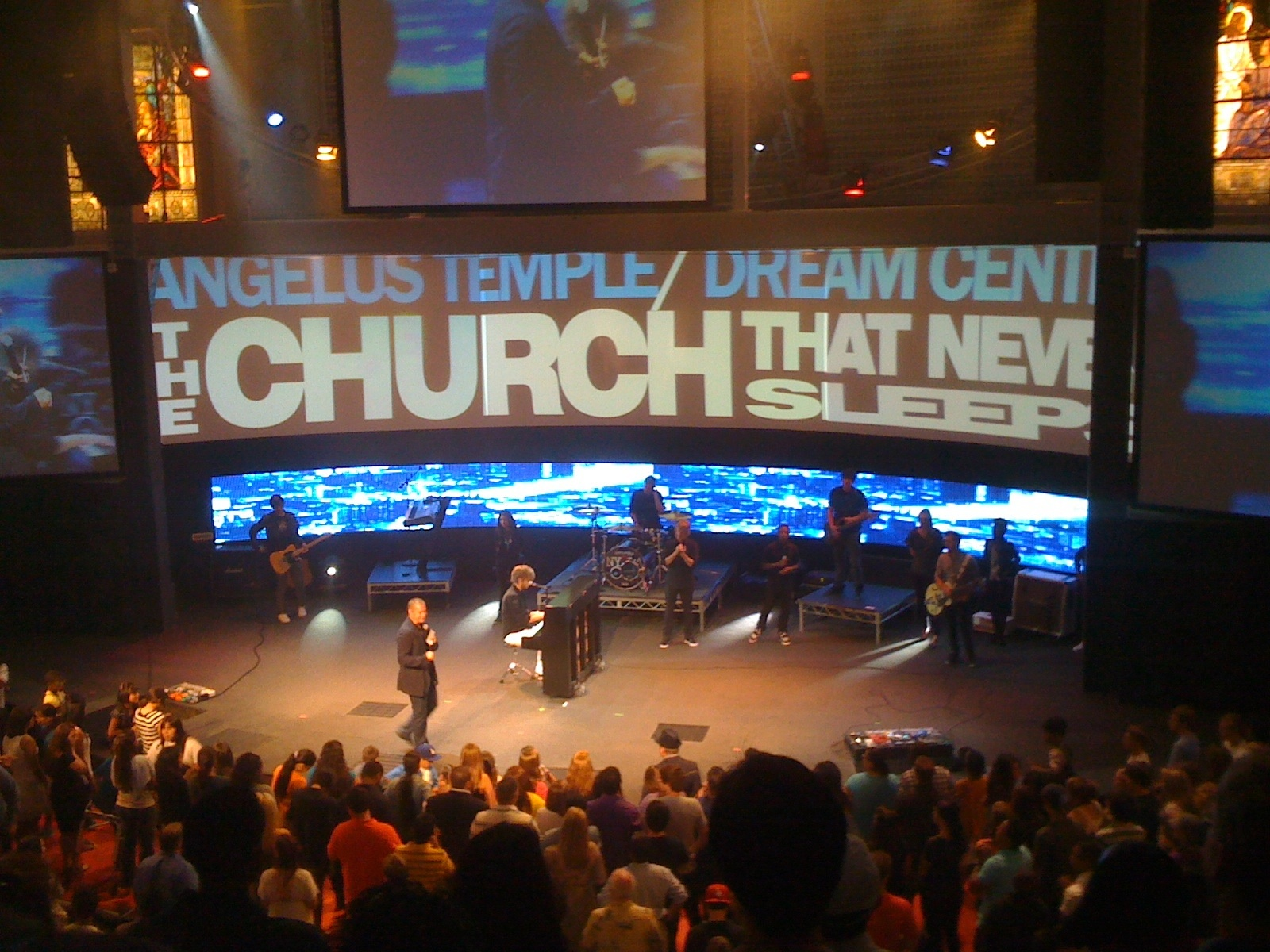
Service in 2010, then part of the Dream Center

== History ==
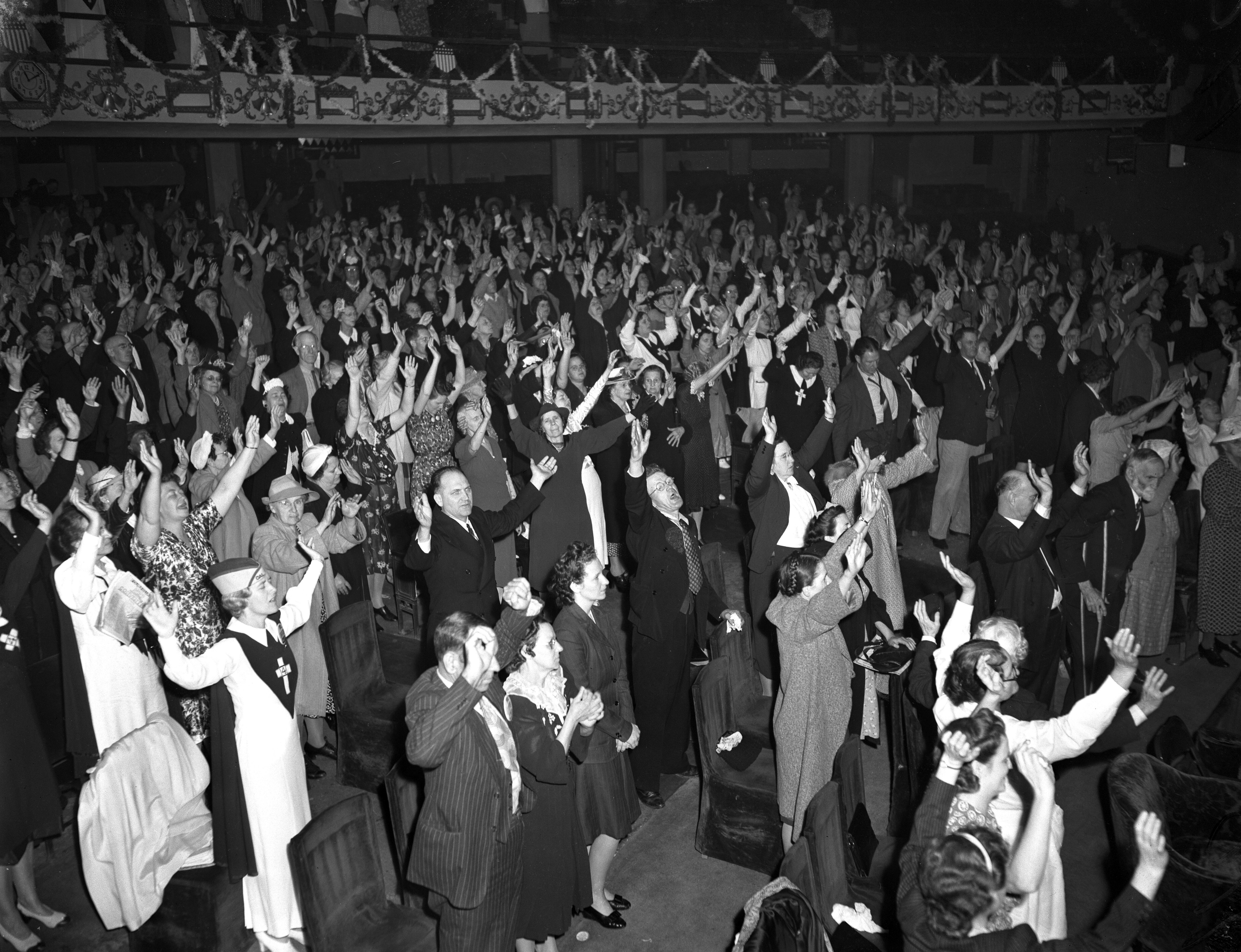
Congregation in 1942

The church was founded in 1923 by Aimee Semple McPherson. She chose Los Angeles as the location of the Temple after receiving a vision of the California dream, "a little home in Los Angeles," as she prayed beside her ill daughter, Roberta. When McPherson found the lot near Echo Lake, she paused silently and then said, "This is the place God would have us build."

McPherson hired Brook Hawkins from Winter Construction Company, the architect of the Culver Hotel, the Grauman's Metropolitan Theatre and the Pasadena Playhouse.

The Angelus Temple building, seating 5,300 people, was opened in Echo Park on January 1, 1923. On opening day, McPherson told a reporter, "Today is the happiest day of my entire life. I can hardly believe that this great temple has been built for me!" She managed to raise $250,000 from wealthy followers to finance the construction. The temple is considered to be the first megachurch built in the United States, and its 125-foot-wide dome was the largest in North America. Attendance in McPherson's day reached as much as 10,000 people.

In 1924, a radio station, KFSG, began operation from the site. Twin towers were constructed atop the building to support the station's transmitting antenna. In 1927, it opened a food bank and soup kitchen near the church distributing food, clothing and blankets.

According to church records, Angelus Temple received 40 million visitors within the first seven years. At first, McPherson preached every service, often in a dramatic scene she put together to attract audiences.

In 1972, the temple was renovated with a $500,000 budget.

In November 2001, Matthew Barnett became the senior pastor.

In 2015, the weekly attendance was 8,975.

== Social programs ==
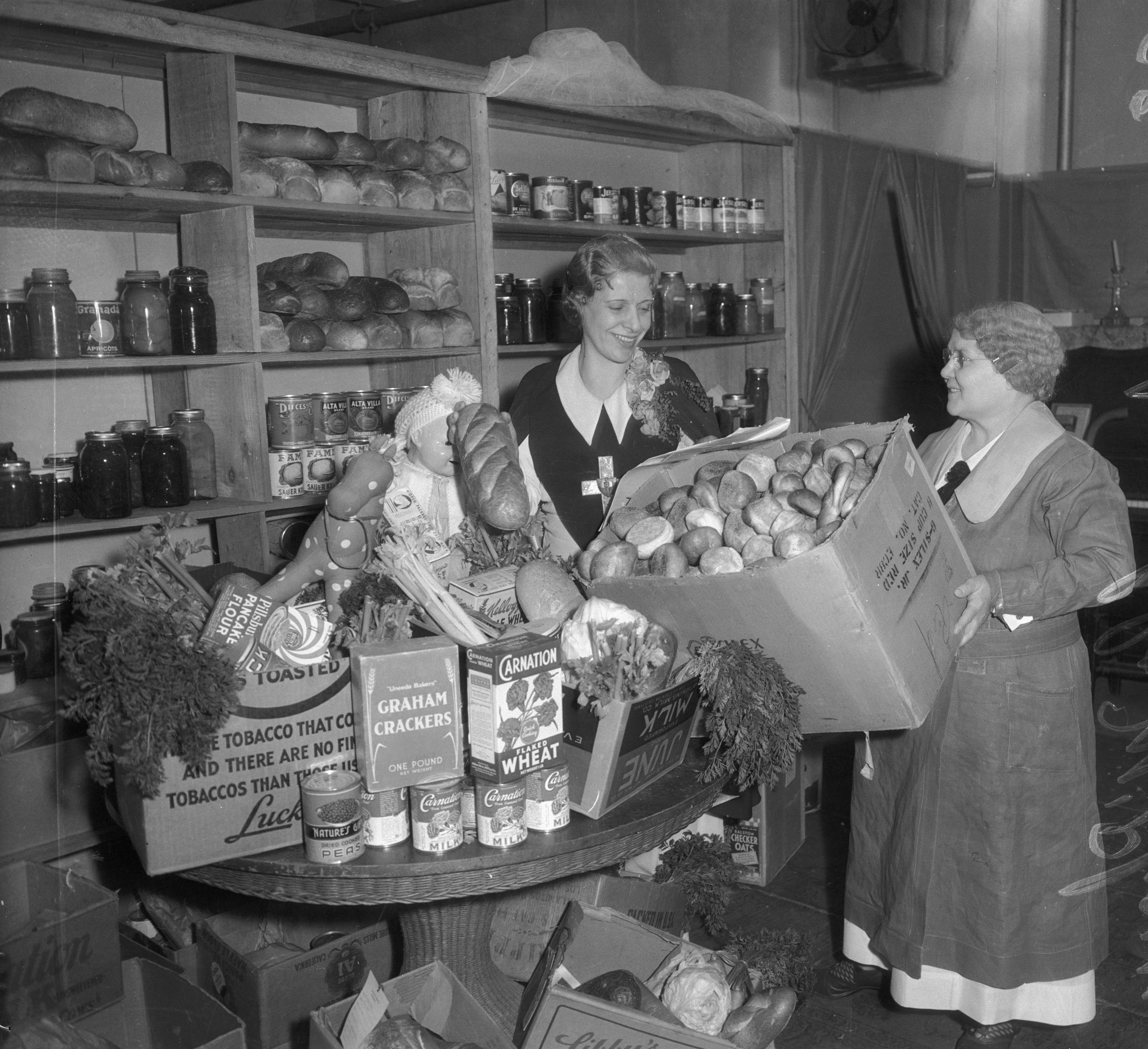
McPherson prepares Christmas baskets, 1935.

The former Queen of Angels Hospital is the base of operations for the Dream Center, an organization who offers a food bank, clothing and assistance programs for disaster victims, victims of domestic violence, drug addiction and trafficking in human beings and prisoners. In 2001, Pastor Matthew Barnett and the International Church of the Foursquare Gospel united the Dream Center with Angelus Temple.

== Buildings ==
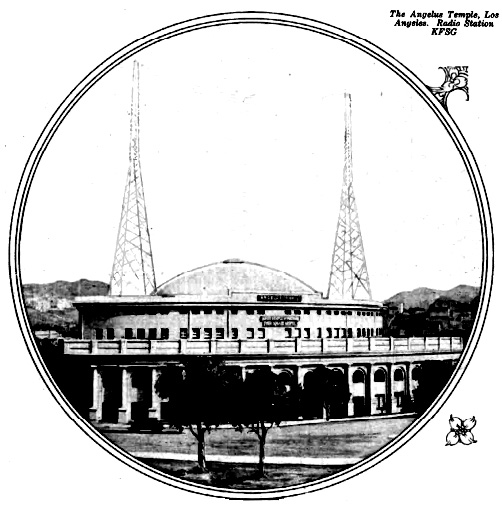
In 1924, radio station KFSG began operation, with the transmitting antenna strung between two towers constructed atop the building.

Angelus Temple was dedicated on January 1, 1923. The cornerstone of the building bears the inscription "Dedicated unto the cause of inter-denominational and worldwide evangelism".

The temple, located opposite Echo Park Lake, had an original seating capacity of 5,300. In 2002, a renovation left the temple with a capacity of 3,500. According to the United States Department of Labor's Consumer Price Index, Angelus Temple's construction would cost $3,245,964 in 2014.

Angelus Temple was the largest construction of its time in North America, rising "125 feet from the main floor". A panorama of clouds, the work of artist Anne Henneke, adorns the ceiling, and the temple has eight stained glass windows depicting the life of Jesus Christ, created by artist George Haskins. The building underwent renovations in 1972, while still retaining its original interior and exterior appearance. The lighted cross atop the temple's dome is a longstanding landmark. The entire temple was designated a National Historic Landmark in 1992.

The temple was a Class "A" fireproof building constructed of concrete and steel designed by Brook Hawkins. The structure's main architectural feature is its large, unsupported concrete dome coated with a mixture of ground abalone shells. The dome's interior was painted azure blue, with fleecy clouds, a reminder to "work while it's day" and "to look for His coming". McPherson insisted on a bright, joyous setting, avoiding any reminder of sin from either artwork or motto. In back of the pulpit was her theme verse from Hebrews 13:8: "Jesus Christ the same yesterday, and today and forever." She later said that she loved "every stone in Angelus Temple,...I love to touch its walls, its altar,...I look to its high vaulted dome...." but no part of the church pleased her more than the magnificent Kimball pipe organ which always soothed her and brought her peace of mind.

After the temple's dedication in 1923, the 5,300-seat auditorium was filled three times each day, seven days a week.

L.I.F.E. Bible College was founded in a building adjacent to Angelus Temple. This building is currently the home of the Angelus Temple Hispanic Church.

McPherson lived in the parsonage adjacent to the Temple; it is currently open to visitors.

== See also ==
- List of Registered Historic Places in Los Angeles
- List of the largest churches in the USA
- List of the largest evangelical churches
- List of the largest evangelical church auditoriums
