= List of Assemblies of God schools =

This is a list of postsecondary educational institutions affiliated with the Assemblies of God.

== North America ==
=== Bahamas ===
- Assemblies of God Bible College, Nassau, Bahamas

=== Canada ===
There are nine bible colleges affiliated with the Pentecostal Assemblies of Canada.

- Summit Pacific College, Abbotsford, British Columbia
- Vanguard College, Edmonton, Alberta
- Horizon College and Seminary, Saskatoon, Saskatchewan
- Master's College and Seminary, Peterborough, Ontario, Ontario
- Aboriginal Bible Academy, Deseronto, Ontario
- Global University Canada, Toronto, Ontario
- Institut biblique du Québec, Longueuil, Quebec

=== Jamaica ===
- Assemblies of God Bible College, Christiana, Jamaica

=== Puerto Rico ===
- Caribbean Theological College, Bayamón, Puerto Rico (A.A., B.A.)

=== United States ===
In the United States, AG schools are affiliated with the Assemblies of God USA.

==== Bible and theological ====
- Latin American Bible Institute, California, La Puente, California
- Christ Mission College (formerly Latin American Bible Institute) Texas, San Antonio, Texas
- Native American Bible College, Shannon, North Carolina (B.R.E.)
- Northpoint Bible College, Haverhill, Massachusetts (A.A., B.A., M.A.) (A.B.H.E., Professional Accreditation)
- Trinity Bible College & Graduate School, Ellendale, North Dakota (A.A., B.A., M.A., DCL, PhD) (North Central Association of Colleges and Schools; A.B.H.E., Professional Accreditation)
- Western Bible College, Phoenix, Arizona (A.A., B.A.)

==== Liberal arts ====
- American Indian College, Phoenix, Arizona (A.A., B.A.) (N.C.A.C.S., Regional Accreditation)
- Evangel University, Springfield, Missouri (A.A., B.A., B.B.A., B.F.A., B.M., B.S., B.S.W., M.A., M.Ed., M.S.) (N.C.A.C.S., Regional Accreditation)
- North Central University, Minneapolis, Minnesota (A.A., B.A., B.S., MA) (N.C.A.C.S., Regional Accreditation)
- Northwest University, Kirkland, Washington (A.A., B.A., B.F.A., B.M., B.S., M.A., M.B.A., MIT., M. ED., Psy. D.) (N.W.C.C.U., Regional Accreditation)
- Southeastern University, Lakeland, Florida (A.A., B.A., B.S., B.S.W., M.A., M.B.A., M.Ed., Ed.D., D.Min.) (S.A.C.S., Regional Accreditation)
- Nelson University (formerly Southwestern Assemblies of God University), Waxahachie, Texas (A.A., B.A., B.S., M.A., M.Div., M.Ed., M.S., D.Min.) (S.A.C.S., Regional Accreditation)
- Vanguard University of Southern California, Costa Mesa, California (B.A., B.S., M.A., M.B.A., M.S.) (W.A.S.C., Regional Accreditation)

==== Distance education ====
- Global University, Springfield, Missouri (A.A., B.A., M.A., M.Div., D.Min.) (N.C.A.C.S., Regional Accreditation)
- Nelson University, Waxahachie, Texas (A.A., B.A., B.S., M.A., M.Div., M.Ed., M.S.) (S.A.C.S., Regional Accreditation)
- Vanguard University of Southern California, Costa Mesa, California (B.A., B.S., M.A., M.B.A., M.S.) (W.A.S.C., Regional Accreditation)

==== Seminary ====
- Assemblies of God Theological Seminary, Springfield, Missouri (M.A., MATS, M.Div., Th.M., D.Min., DAIS, PhD) (N.C.A.C.S., Regional Accreditation; A.T.S., Professional Accreditation)

==== Student ministry ====
- Chi Alpha Campus Ministries

== South America ==
=== Brazil ===
- Instituto Bíblico das Assembleias de Deus (IBAD), Pindamonhangaba, São Paulo

=== Venezuela ===
- Seminario Evangélico Pentecostal de las Asambleas de Dios – SEPAD (antes Instituto Bíblico Central – IBC), Barquisimeto, Estado Lara.

== Asia ==
=== India ===
- Bethel Bible College, Punalur, Kerala
- Southern Asia Bible College, Bangalore, Karnataka
- Assemblies of God Tamil Nadu Bible College, Madurai, Tamil Nadu
- Antioch Biblical Seminary and College, , Pondicherry

=== Indonesia ===
- Sekolah Tinggi Teologi Satyabhakti, Malang, Indonesia
- Sekolah Pekerja Kristus-SPK, Surabaya, Indonesia
- Pusat Pelatihan Misi Waisango, Halmahera Timur, Indonesia

=== Japan ===
- Central Bible College, Tokyo, Japan

=== Hong Kong ===
- Ecclesia Bible College, Hong Kong, China
- Ecclesia Theological Seminary, Hong Kong, China
- Synergy Institute of Leadership, Hong Kong, China

=== Taiwan ===
- Assemblies of God School of Theology, Taichung, Taiwan

=== Malaysia ===
- Bible College of Malaysia, Petaling Jaya, Malaysia
- Malaysia Tamil Bible Institute, Nilai, Negeri Sembilan, Malaysia

=== Philippines ===
- Asia Pacific Theological Seminary, Baguio, Philippines
- Assemblies of God School of Ministry, Cainta, Rizal, Philippines
- Bethel Bible College, Valenzuela, Philippines
- Evangel Bible College, Daraga, Albay, Philippines
- Luzon Bible College, Binalonan, Pangasinan, Philippines
- Immanuel Bible College, Cebu City, Philippines

=== Singapore ===
- Assemblies of God Bible College, Singapore
- TCA College, Singapore

=== Myanmar ===
- Immanuel Bible College, Pyin Oo Lwin Myo, Myanmar

== Australia ==
Schools affiliated with the Australian Christian Churches, the Assemblies of God in Australia:

- Alphacrucis, Sydney, New South Wales
- Harvest Bible College, Melbourne, Victoria
- Hillsong International Leadership College, Sydney, New South Wales
- Planetshakers College, Melbourne, Victoria
- Brisbane Christian College, Brisbane, Queensland
- Northside Christian College, Brisbane, Queensland
- Calvary Christian College, Townsville, Queensland

== Europe ==
=== Belgium ===
- Continental Theological Seminary, Sint-Pieters-Leeuw, Belgium

=== Portugal ===
- Monte Esperança Instituto Bíblico das Assembleias de Deus, Loures, Portugal

=== France ===
- L'Institut de Théologie Biblique des Assemblées de Dieu de France
- Global University France

=== United Kingdom ===
- Mattersey Hall, Mattersey, United Kingdom

== Africa ==
=== Kenya ===
- KAG EAST

==== University ====
- , Nairobi

Kenya Assemblies of God East Africa School of Theology University (KAG EAST University)

==== Bible School ====
- Kenya Assemblies of God Extension (KAGE), Most part of the country

=== Nigeria ===
==== Bible and Theological ====
- Assemblies of God Divinity School, Old Umuahia
- Western Bible College, Iperu

==== Seminary ====
- Bethel Seminary, Nekede, Owerri
- Assemblies of God Seminary, Igoli, Ogoja

==== University ====
- Evangel University, Akaeze

=== Togo ===
==== Bible and Theological ====
- West Africa Advanced School of Theology, Lomé

=== Congo Democratic ===
==== Bible ====
[Institut Biblique et Théologique des Assemblées de Dieu, IBTAD], Kinshasa

==== Theological ====
- [Faculté Théologique des Assemblées de Dieu, FATAD], Kinshasa

=== Tanzania Republic ===
==== Bible and Theological ====
- African Continent Theological Seminary, Dodoma
- Central Bible College, Dodoma
- Global Harvest Bible College, Dar es salaam
