= William D. Morrow =

Former Pentecostal Denominational Leader

William D. Morrow is a retired Pastor, District Superintendent for the Western Ontario District, General Superintendent of the Pentecostal Assemblies of Canada (PAOC), and President of Master's College and Seminary (MCS), a PAOC degree-granting institution. In partial retirement, he subsequently served as an Associate Pastor, Discipleship and Leadership at Evangel Pentecostal Church in Montreal until January 2016.

MCS lists Morrow's CV as a diploma from Eastern Pentecostal Bible College (now MCS, Peterborough, ON); a B.A. from Concordia University (Montreal, PQ); a M.P.St. from Saint Paul University (Ottawa, ON); and a D.Min. from United Theological Seminary (Dayton, OH) in their 2012-2013 college catalogue

Morrow is a past executive committee member of the Pentecostal World Fellowship, executive board member of the Pentecostal/Charismatic Churches of North America (PCCNA), and executive council member of the World Assemblies of God Fellowship.

Dr. Morrow's ministry history includes three pastoral charges (including Montreal & Smith Falls), professor and dean of students at Eastern Pentecostal Bible College (presently Master's College and Seminary), six years as District Superintendent of the Western Ontario District (1991–1996). From January 1997 to 2008, Dr. Morrow served as the General Superintendent of The Pentecostal Assemblies of Canada, a fellowship of approximately 1000 self-governing churches as well as many missionary works around the world. Intending to retire following his resignation, Morrow was then asked to serve as the President of the then-struggling Master's College and Seminary, a position he then held from late 2008 until the spring of 2013.

== General Superintendent ==
"Bill" came into office during a time of social and cultural change. Problems with the missionary funding structure, financial difficulties at the national office due to real estate downturns, and the need for technological updates were only a few of the major challenges facing the PAOC. The restructuring of the International Office, as the fellowship's headquarters is called, was given top priority, a new way to support overseas missions ("shared funding") was instituted whereby individual churches agreed to support specific missionaries; reaching "restricted access nations" became a major missions goal; and General Conferences became a time of spiritual impute first and business second. "Priority One" missions was initiated which included "Mission Canada" (the idea that missions is done wherever people don't have adequate indigenous access to Christian witness). Mission Canada focuses on reaching Canadians with the Gospel in five key areas - The Next Generation (children, youth, university/college campuses), Quebec & Francophone Canada, Cultural Language Groups, Urban Centres, and Aboriginal Canadians. Morrow was followed by Rev. David Wells, the present General Superintendent at the 2008 General Conference in Toronto on May 6, 2008.

== President of Master's College and Seminary ==
Under Morrow's leadership, Master's College and Seminary once again became one of Eastern Canada's most desired learning institutions among aspiring PAOC leaders. A new mission statement was put in place to help clarify the purpose and identity of the college. During his years of leadership, MCS saw a move back to Peterborough, Ontario from Toronto, Ontario, which led to an increase of enrollment in the years leading to his retirement. Morrow also initiated a campaign to pay down the debt and bring financial stability to the institution. Morrow helped MCS through some of the most difficult years in its history to date. He was succeeded by Rev. Richard Janes as president in 2013.
