= Nazarene Bible College =

Bible college in Colorado Springs, Colorado

- Motto: "Christian Education for those Called to Serve"
- Type: Bible College
- Established: 1967
- Religious affiliation: Nazarene
- President: John C. Bowling
- Students: 1400
- Location: Colorado Springs, Colorado, United States; 38.813760°N 104.753080°W
- Campus: City
- Colors: Navy and Silver
- Website: www.nbc.edu

Nazarene Bible College (NBC) is a private Nazarene Bible college in Colorado Springs, Colorado, United States. It was founded in 1964, chartered in 1967, and approved by the Colorado Department of Education to grant degrees in 1970. NBC has a 7:1 student-to-faculty ratio. Although the college is accredited by the Higher Learning Commission, it was placed on probation in November 2025 for not meeting HLC criteria related to financial resources.

== Academics ==
Nazarene Bible College is a baccalaureate granting institution affiliated with the Church of the Nazarene. All the degree programs (except Christian counseling) are offered through the online delivery system.

NBC has been accredited by the Higher Learning Commission (HLC) of the North Central Association of Colleges and Schools since 2006, and the Commission on Accreditation of the Association for Biblical Higher Education (ABHE) since 1976. NBC is also approved by the United States Department of Education (USDE), the Colorado Commission on Higher Education (CCHE), and the Association of Christian Schools International (ACSI).

NBC has collaborated with several institutions, including Caribbean Nazarene College, Nazarene Higher Education Consortium, Nazarene Theological College, The Salvation Army and South Pacific Nazarene Theological College.

In 2017, the college announced its intention to close its physical campus in Colorado Springs and switch to online-only instruction, citing declining enrollment for in-person offerings with just 73 students in 2016. The property was sold for redevelopment, with the bell tower and circular chapel building to be retained in the housing complex that was built on the site.

== Presidents ==
- Charles H. Strickland: 1967–1972
- Leonard S. Oliver: 1972–1984
- Jerry D. Lambert: 1984–1994
- Hiram E. Sanders: 1994–2006
- Harold B. Graves Jr.: 2006–2021
- Scott J. Sherwood: 2021-2025
- John C. Bowling: 2025–present

== See also ==
- DCourseWeb
- List of Church of the Nazarene schools
