= Delta Epsilon Chi =

Delta Epsilon Chi may refer to:

- the former name of DECA's college division
- an honor society sponsored by the Association for Biblical Higher Education
