= Charles Strickland =

Charles Strickland may refer to:

- Sir Charles Strickland, 8th Baronet (1819–1909), barrister and rower
- Charles H. Strickland (1916–1988), general superintendent in the Church of the Nazarene
- Charles Strickland (town planner) (fl. 1860), local agent and town planner in County Mayo for Lord Dillon
- The main character in the 1919 novel by William Somerset Maugham, The Moon and Sixpence

== See also ==
- Charles Stickland (born 1968), senior Royal Marines officer
