= Summit Pacific College =

Canadian Bible college

- Former name: 1941-1961 British Columbia Bible Institute 1962-2003 Western Pentecostal Bible College
- Motto: Educate. Equip. Enrich.
- Type: Private undergraduate and Postgraduate seminary, or Bible college,
- Established: 1941 as British Columbia Bible Institute 1962 as Western Pentecostal Bible College 2003 as Summit Pacific College
- Accreditation: ABHE; CHEA; ACSI
- Affiliations: PAOC; EFC
- President: Dr. Andrew Evans
- Students: ca. 200
- Location: 35235 Straiton Road, Abbotsford, Abbotsford, B.C., Canada; 49.0545°N 122.3280°W
- Campus: 76-acre (31 ha) Rural
- Website: www.summitpacific.ca

Summit Pacific College (formerly Western Pentecostal Bible College) is an undergraduate and postgraduate Bible college and seminary, on a foothill of Sumas Mountain in Abbotsford, British Columbia, Canada. It is accredited by the Association for Biblical Higher Education and is the theological college of the BC & Yukon District of the Pentecostal Assemblies of Canada.

== History ==
Summit Pacific College (originally British Columbia Bible Institute) was established in 1941 following a meeting of the ministers from the British Columbia and Yukon District of the Pentecostal Assemblies of Canada. The ministers were greatly concerned for the need of young people who were seeking to answer God's call to the Christian ministry. A suitable college for the training of such youth was seen to be an urgent need. Thus, the invitation by the official board of Glad Tidings Tabernacle of Victoria was gladly accepted, and within the facilities of that church, the British Columbia Bible Institute opened its doors in the fall of 1941. The founder and first President was Rev. Ernie W. Robinson.

As the years passed the growing college felt the need for its own campus and residences. Thus, in 1951, it moved to a residential campus in North Vancouver (city). In 1962 British Columbia Bible Institute was renamed Western Pentecostal Bible College. A program to add buildings and facilities saw a steady upgrading of the original plant. Nevertheless, it became evident that future requirements called for larger accommodations outside of urban restrictions. As early as 1966 there was a preliminary land purchase, but it was not until 1971 that the present site was acquired.

New campus construction began in 1973, and the college took occupation in the fall of 1974. The three original buildings (the Eric A. Hornby Memorial Academic Building, the William J. Friesen Residence, and the Ernie W. Robinson Dormitory) were augmented by the Vernon Morrison Residence in 1977 and the P.S. Jones Memorial Auditorium in 1979.

In 1983, the governing bodies of the college made public the plans for new buildings on campus. This new project was titled the “Nehemiah Project”. The new proposed buildings were The Mary Ellen Anderson Memorial Chapel (1986), The Lorne Philip Hudson Memorial Library (1988), and a proposed new dormitory. It is stated that the need for these new buildings was not to enlarge the college but to complete the campus. Unfortunately, not enough money was raised for a new dormitory and the college would not see their new dormitory until 2001.

In 1999, a proposal was put forward for a new residence building on campus. The existing Ernie W. Robinson Dormitory (1974) was only capable of housing 100 students while the proposed new building would house 140 students. The L. T. Holdcroft Residence was completed in 2001 and is still in use today.

In 2004, The Phil and Jennie Gaglardi Memorial Auditorium (2004) was built and replaced the P.S. Jones Memorial Auditorium (1979). The P.S. Jones Memorial Auditorium was eventually sold to Christian Life Community Church and would be used as their church building.

In 2010, the Eric A. Hornby Memorial Academic Building saw a significant revitalization, as well as a new academic wing, called the Revival and Learning Centre.

During the last decade, all of the college buildings have been carefully maintained for safety and optimum learning conditions.

In 2023, The college ended its direct affiliation with Trinity Western University in Langley, BC in favour of developing its own teaching faculty and independence.

== Programs and majors ==
Summit Pacific College offers undergraduate degree programs in Biblical Theology, Pastoral Theology, Child and Family Leadership, Music Leadership, Youth Leadership, Non-Profit Global Leadership, and Counselling Foundations. Summit also offers one and two-year concentrated certificates as well as in these areas. SPC is accredited by the ABHE and chartered by the government of British Columbia. Additionally, Summit Pacific College is affiliated with Trinity Western University of Langley, British Columbia. Summit Pacific College offers its graduates Certificates, Diplomas and bachelor's degrees. The bachelor's degrees are; Bachelor of Arts In Religion and Bachelor of Theology (B.Th.).

A popular program at Summit Pacific College is the one-year Certificate program, OMEGA. The OMEGA program has an academic and service emphasis for 2 semesters and ends with a 3-week overseas mission trip in May. OMEGA has a strong focus on the Biblical idea of personal discipleship, emphasized by mentoring with professors, academic study and Christian ministry outreach with small group involvement.

Summit Pacific College recently added graduate-level studies with the introduction of School of Graduate Studies. Being strongly committed to the future development of its curriculum, The School of Graduate Studies currently offers courses from five core areas related to Pentecostal Assemblies of Canada credentials. These areas of study are Hermeneutics, Homiletics, Pentecostal Theology/Distinctives, Pentecostal History, and Pastoral Theology. In 2022 the college launched a Master of Arts degree in Theology and Spiritual Leadership and a Master of Arts degree in Youth Ministry. Completion of five certificate courses may be transferred into the MA degrees. The Dean of Graduate Studies is Dr. Riku P. Tuppurainen.

== Campus and Facilities ==
=== R. J. Stronstad Learning Center ===
This building houses several campus facilities: the majority of the college's administrative and faculty offices, including the President, Dean of Education, dean of students, Business Administrator, Omega Global, and Enrolment Services; seven classrooms; the college bookstore; and a student lounge. The main wing of the building is named "The Eric A. Hornby Memorial Academic Building"

In the spring of 2010, the college completed a building program that added the Revival and Learning Centre to the newly renovated Academic Building providing new classrooms and faculty offices.

In January 2023, Summit's Board of Governors approved renaming our Academic Building in honour of Dr. Roger Stronstad. While the names of the two wings of the building remained the same, the entire facility is now known as the “R. J. Stronstad Academic Center”.

=== The Lorne Philip Hudson Memorial Library ===
Constructed in 1988, the library houses a collection that now totals more than 100,000 items, including books, CDs, newspapers, magazines journals, musical scores and DVDs. The library also has an extensive archival collection of items pertaining to the college and the Pentecostal Assemblies of Canada. The library includes a digital database of its collection, with remote access, and several public access computers. The Library hosts its own website (www.summitpacific.net), including access to the library database and to electronic books, journals, newsletters, audio recordings, videos and reference websites. The library exterior was completely refurbished in 2013 along with extensive renovations to the interior.

=== The Mary Ellen Anderson Memorial Chapel ===
Constructed in 1986, the 350-seat chapel features a stained glass window. The chapel contains storage rooms adjacent to the platform and a sound room. The basement houses faculty offices, a classroom seating forty, a music lab, a recording studio and seven music practice rooms. The chapel was completely refurbished in 2010.

=== The William J. Friesen Residence ===
This four-suite apartment contains three three-bedroom apartments, one two-bedroom apartment and a common laundry room. Depending on individual needs either married or single students may be housed in the suites.

=== The Vernon R. Morrison Residence ===
This sixteen-unit apartment contains nine one-bedroom and seven two-bedroom suites. Although smaller than the standard size, the second bedroom in the two-bedroom suite is adequate as a child's room or as a study. The building also has a lounge, a laundry room and individual storage lockers. Depending on individual needs, either married or single students may be housed in the suites.

=== The Phil and Jennie Gaglardi Memorial Gymnasium ===
This building doubles as a college size gymnasium with room for spectators and an auditorium seating up to 600 people. College banquets are held in the gym at Christmas and Graduation. It also houses an exercise/weight room and washroom/shower facilities. Significant upgrades were completed in 2013.

During major social events, the gymnasium is often converted into an auditorium and is used for graduation reception dinners, Christmas functions, and the like. The building is named after the former British Columbia Minister of Highways, Phil Gaglardi and his wife.

== Student life ==
Campus life is a large part of Summit Pacific College's and students are required to be in dormitories, with some exceptions, notably in the case of off-campus family and married students. The College has three housing facilities. The L.T. Holdcroft building is the largest and newest building, while the Morrison building is an older building, holding married students and overflow students from the L.T. Holdcroft. The third housing building is the Friesen building, a for married couples and their families. Both professors and students occupy the Friesen and Morrison buildings.

=== Student Leadership ===
Summit Pacific College employs selected students to take on the responsibilities of Resident Assistant, who answer to the Resident Supervisor, who is responsible to answer to the dean of students. In the a typical school year, there are two Supervisors and ten Assistants.

The Student Council consists of the Student Body President, vice-president, Secretary, Treasurer, Sports Coordinator, Missions Coordinator, Commuter Students Coordinator, and Married Students Coordinator.

== Presidents ==
- Ernie W. Robinson, 1941–1956
- Tom Johnstone, 1956–1958
- Vernon R. Morrison, 1959–1968
- Dr. L. Thomas Holdcroft, 1968–1987
- Dr. James G. Richards, 1987–2006
- Dr. Dave L. Demchuk, 2006 -2026
- Andrew Evans, 2025–present

== Spirituality ==
Summit Pacific College is a Christian college/seminary, training pastors, ministers, administrators and other workers for full-time ministry, church vocation or the not-for-profit sector. The college is strictly defined as Christian Protestant Evangelical Pentecostal in belief, structure and theology. Since the college is Pentecostal, the work of the Holy Spirit is stressed as a personal way in which God works to use and disciple the individual.
