= NABC =

NABC is an initialism that may refer to any of the following:

- North American Bridge Championships, North American contract bridge tournaments
- National Association of Basketball Coaches, an American trade association of men's college basketball coaches
- Native American Bible College, an American bible college located in Shannon, North Carolina
- North American Boxing Council, a North American sanctioning body for boxing
- North American Baptist Conference, a North American association of Baptist Congregations of German ethnic heritage.
- North American Bengali Conference, a Bengali cultural organisation
- New Albanian Brewing Company, an American microbrewery located in New Albany, Indiana
