= Evangel Bible College =

Bible college in Albay, Philippines

Coordinates: 13°09′19″N 123°42′48″E

Evangel Bible College, formerly South Central Bible Institute, is located at 1744 Lakandula Drive, Daraga, Albay, Philippines. This is a Bible college of the Philippines General Council of the Assemblies of God, Valenzuela City. The school is a member of the Asia Pacific Theological Association.

Debbie Johnson was its president from 2007 to 2009. The current president is Nelly Fulgencio.

== See also ==
- List of Assemblies of God schools
