= FaithWay Baptist College of Canada =

Theological college in Ontario, Canada

- Motto: Training servants for the Master
- Type: Private Bible college
- Established: 1991
- Affiliations: Baptist
- President: Pastor Eric Léveillé
- Faculty: 15
- Location: Ajax, Ontario, Canada; 43°53′51″N 79°01′52″W
- Campus: Urban
- Colours: Red and black
- Website: www.fbccanada.org

FaithWay Baptist College of Canada is a private Baptist Bible college in Ajax, Ontario, Canada.

== History ==
It was founded in 1983 by Dr. Robert D. Kirkland and Dr. James O. Phillips, and officially recognized by the province of Ontario as a private university under the FaithWay Baptist College of Canada Act, 1991.

== Status ==
In 1991, the Ontario legislature officially recognized the seminary as a degree-granting institution through the passage of "An Act to Incorporate FaithWay Baptist College of Canada Act, 1991".

== Governance ==
The seminary is governed by a board of trustees, roughly half of which is made up of members and officials of the FaithWay Baptist Church, and a Senate composed of the faculty, school administrators and several trustees.

== Academic programs ==
Programs include:

- Certificate of Biblical Studies
- Graduate of Theology Diploma
- Bachelor of Theology Degree – Church Administration
- Bachelor of Theology Degree – Missions
- Bachelor of Religious Education Degree – Church Administration
- Bachelor of Religious Education Degree – Missions
- Bachelor of Religious Education Degree – Church Ministries
- Bachelor of Religious Education Degree – Music
- Bachelor of Religious Education Degree – Christian Day School
- Bachelor of Sacred Music Degree
