= DCourseWeb =

dCourseWeb is an Internet-based application designed by Nazarene Bible College (NBC) to manage online education programs. It includes a course or learning management system, along with an advising utility for advising and scheduling both students and instructors. The system maintains historical information on instructors, students, and courses for use by administrators, instructors, and advisors. The application is both an administrative tool and an instructional tool.

NBC developed dCourseWeb and offers access to other schools. Currently, a few other institutions are using dCourseWeb for online classes (including The Salvation Army, Welch College, The Institute for Ministry Enrichment, and Caribbean Nazarene College).

NBC is dual accredited by both the Higher Learning Commission (HLC), a commission of the North Central Association of Colleges and Schools, and the Association for Biblical Higher Education (ABHE). Along with accreditation, both organizations approve NBC’s online program delivery system. In fact, ABHE uses the dCourseWeb platform to deliver instruction courses for their site visit team member’s, and instruction courses for others on acquiring and maintaining accreditation.

== Background ==
In 1998, Nazarene Bible College began their online education program using Convene technology (also known as CLiP). However, each time Convene updated their technology, it required NBC to re-enter the online education material making it extremely inconvenient. Nevertheless, NBC used Convene until the company disbanded. After many in-house discussions, NBC decided they wanted a better place for content and began working with Prometheus. Prometheus was developed by George Washington University and was used at NBC until they sold out to Blackboard in 2002. Shortly after, Blackboard increased costs to use their technology, which led to NBC’s decision to write their own platform in-house and possess control.

NBC’s directive was to write a program where it was necessary to enter the online education material once and did not require re-entering the information when updates or changes occurred. Therefore, dCourse launched in 2002 as a windows application that managed all students’ discussion access with a Web piece to deliver class information. At that time, spreadsheets were used to manage scheduling and advising. Shortly after its creation, other organizations wanted to employ dCourse, but because its access with limited to inside of NBC, it could not support multiple institutions. As a result, NBC re-wrote dCourse with a Web interface so that NBC could host online education for other like-minded institutions. The re-write also eliminated the need of spreadsheets by incorporating an advising and scheduling module. Therefore, dCourse received an updated name, and dCourseWeb officially launched in 2003. As a hosted solution, running dCourseWeb through NBC’s datacenter has kept prices down for other institutions that could not afford high-profile solutions, or deploy their own solution.

== Features ==
=== Administrative Tool ===
As an administrative tool, dCourseWeb provides extensive scheduling options, faculty management, and student management and communication.

- Advising Utility aids in maintaining student information, i.e. schedules and registration status
- Built-in intervention processes monitor student attendance, activity, and grades, providing advisors and instructors with daily and weekly information to better serve the students
- Secure discussion or classroom environment with a web-access interface that provides a newsgroup like format
- Extensive Help Items provide easy to understand answers to common questions
- Student Center/Chapel area for students and instructors to share prayer requests and services

All information is entered into data tables and then accessed by various applications so that it is easy to update information. Extensive program options enable the system to be customized to look and operate in a way that best fits the needs of the institution. Multiple reports are available to provide detailed information for administrative and assessment purposes.

The program is housed on servers at NBC, so all hardware and software are maintained and managed by NBC. With proper authentication, schools can access the program from any computer with Internet access. This includes remote features like Live Chat.

=== Instructional Tool ===
As an instructional tool, the system is similar to that used by the University of Phoenix. It includes two components: 1) a web-based area for content and resources, and 2) a “store and retrieve” interface for class discussion. Students can access the class content with a browser (Firefox, Chrome, Edge, Internet Explorer, Opera, Safari, and Brave are currently supported) and the threaded discussion application within dCourseWeb called Scribe.

- All forms of media can be built into the program, providing unlimited ability to include materials
- Web-based course content generated using basic XHTML allows added creativity in course design
- Lectures in written, video, and audio formats
- Course content sharing gives Administrators and Instructors a head start in building new courses
- Quiz/exam generating program allows professors to design tests in a variety of formats
- Customizable grade book for instructors - unique to each class
- Project area that supports linear multimedia comments from the instructor or classmates if desired
- Student video projects that will passively encode into the class and allow the student to share it outside of the class
- Areas for instructor information, class roster, and syllabus
- Secure instant messaging feature that is built into the program to enable synchronous conversation with individuals or groups

The course content is stored in data fields and can be used for a single class or shared by multiple classes during the same session. Once course content is created, it is available for use again simply by scheduling the class with a new start date and instructor. When it is time for the class to begin, the system builds the class from the data files and customizes it to fit the instructor and date. The same content can be used by multiple instructors at the same time, with each class built to show the proper instructor. Classes can also utilize joined discussion when desired and class sizes permit.

=== Future Development ===
NBC plans to write a new highly technological quiz/testing module for dCourseweb. This module will have the ability to employ common question formats and be able to mix, and randomize test questions and answers as well as manually or automatically pull from a pool of appropriate questions/answers. It will allow instructors and institutions to share their database of questions and answers with others if desired. With the exception of grading essays, it will have an even stronger ability to grade the tests automatically, and post grades into the class grade book, making it extremely user friendly. This new module will be highly customizable and convenient for its users.

In addition, NBC has plans to integrate an e-portfolio module for assessment and provide tighter integration with the Turnitin services NBC utilizes.

== Integration with other services ==
Through special licensing, the Learning Center includes access to Turnitin, RefWorks, Refaware, and an in-house wiki technology.

== Similar software systems ==
- University of Phoenix

== See also ==
- Learning management system
- Nazarene Bible College
- ABHE
- The Higher Learning Commission
