= Vanguard College =

Coordinates: 53°34′35″N 113°29′52″W

- Former names: Canadian Northwest Bible Institute (1946-1964); Northwest Bible College (1964-2004)
- Motto: Equipping Tomorrow's Ministry Leaders
- Type: Private
- Established: 1946
- Affiliations: Pentecostal Assemblies of Canada, Association for Biblical Higher Education
- President: Mark MacKnight
- Academic staff: +20
- Students: +200
- Location: 12140 103 Street NW; Edmonton, Alberta, Canada; T5G 2J9
- Campus: urban small
- Website: www.vanguardcollege.com

Vanguard College is a Pentecostal theological institute, located in Edmonton, Alberta, Canada. It is affiliated with the Pentecostal Assemblies of Canada.

== History ==
Vanguard College was founded in 1946 as Canadian Northwest Bible Institute (CNBI) by D.N. Buntain. The first classes, towards a three-year Bible diploma program, in the original Central Pentecostal Tabernacle building in Edmonton enrolled forty students and employed six part-time staff. The Canadian Northwest Bible Institute was renamed Northwest Bible College (NBC) in 1964. Northwest Bible College became Vanguard College in May 2004.

== Program ==
To prepare its graduates for ministry, the school offers one- to four-year programs in a variety of disciplines. Students may pursue a Bachelor of Theology (BTh), and select from several specializations, including Next Generation Ministry, Pastoral Care & Counselling, Global Pastoral Ministry, and Worship Arts Ministry. Vanguard also offers a one-year Biblical Foundations Certificate, as well as an After-Degree program for students coming in with a college or university degree (subject to courses transferring). Students are required to do field education, or practical ministry, each academic year. Distance Education courses are also available for online study.

== Partnerships ==
It is affiliated with the Pentecostal Assemblies of Canada and accredited through the Association for Biblical Higher Education (ABHE).

== Residences ==
Although Vanguard College is a non-resident campus, Student Housing is offered to first year students. Student Housing consists of fully furnished apartments in the neighbourhood of the college that are sub-leased to students throughout the school year. In addition, Vanguard can help students locate possible apartments and/or roommates.
