= West Africa Advanced School of Theology =

Bible college in Lomé, Togo

- Type: Private
- Established: 1971
- Affiliations: Assemblies of God
- Location: Lomé, Togo; 6.2009°N 1.1857°E
- Campus: Urban
- Website: www.waast.org

West Africa Advanced School of Theology or WAAST (French: Faculté de théologie des Assemblées de Dieu), located in Lomé, Togo, is a Pentecostal Bible college. It is affiliated with the Assemblies of God.

== History ==
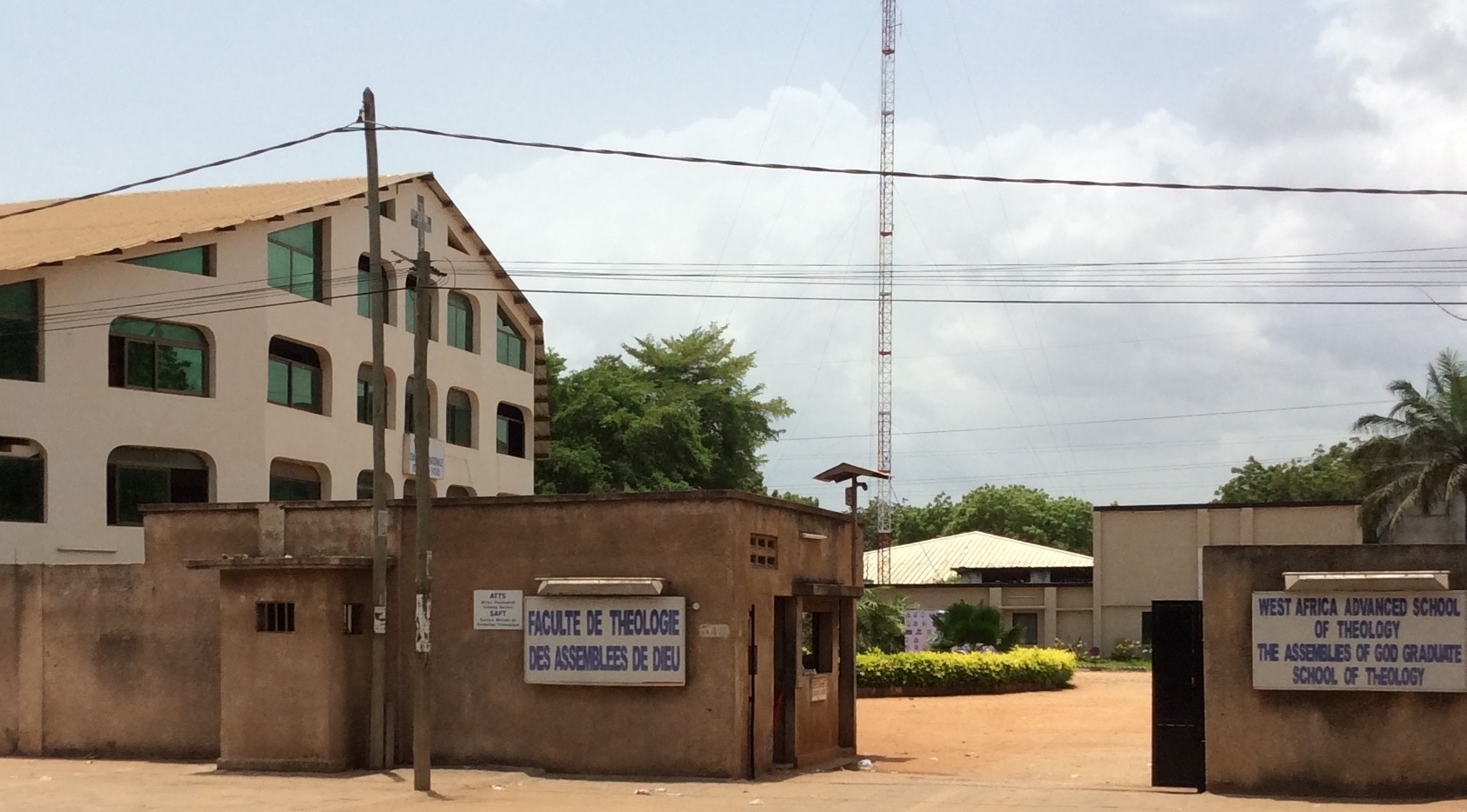
West Africa Advanced School of Theology, in 2018, in Lomé

The school was founded in 1971 under the name of CSTAO by the Assemblies of God. In 2009, a partnership is established with the University of Lomé. . In 2010, Mary Ballenger becomes the president of the school.

== Programs ==
The school offers programs in evangelical Christian theology, whose licentiate and master
