= Ecclesia Theological Seminary =

The Ecclesia Theological Seminary (simplified Chinese: 神召神学院; traditional Chinese: 神召神學院; pinyin: Shénzhào Shénxuéyuàn) is a Christian Protestant seminary in Hong Kong. It was founded in 1947 in Guangzhou by J. Elmor Morrison, a missionary of the Assemblies of God from Canada. Its mission is to train Pentecostal leaders for tomorrow. Ecclesia Theological Seminary is an accredited school of the Asia Pacific Theological Association and an associate member of Asia Theological Association.

== History ==
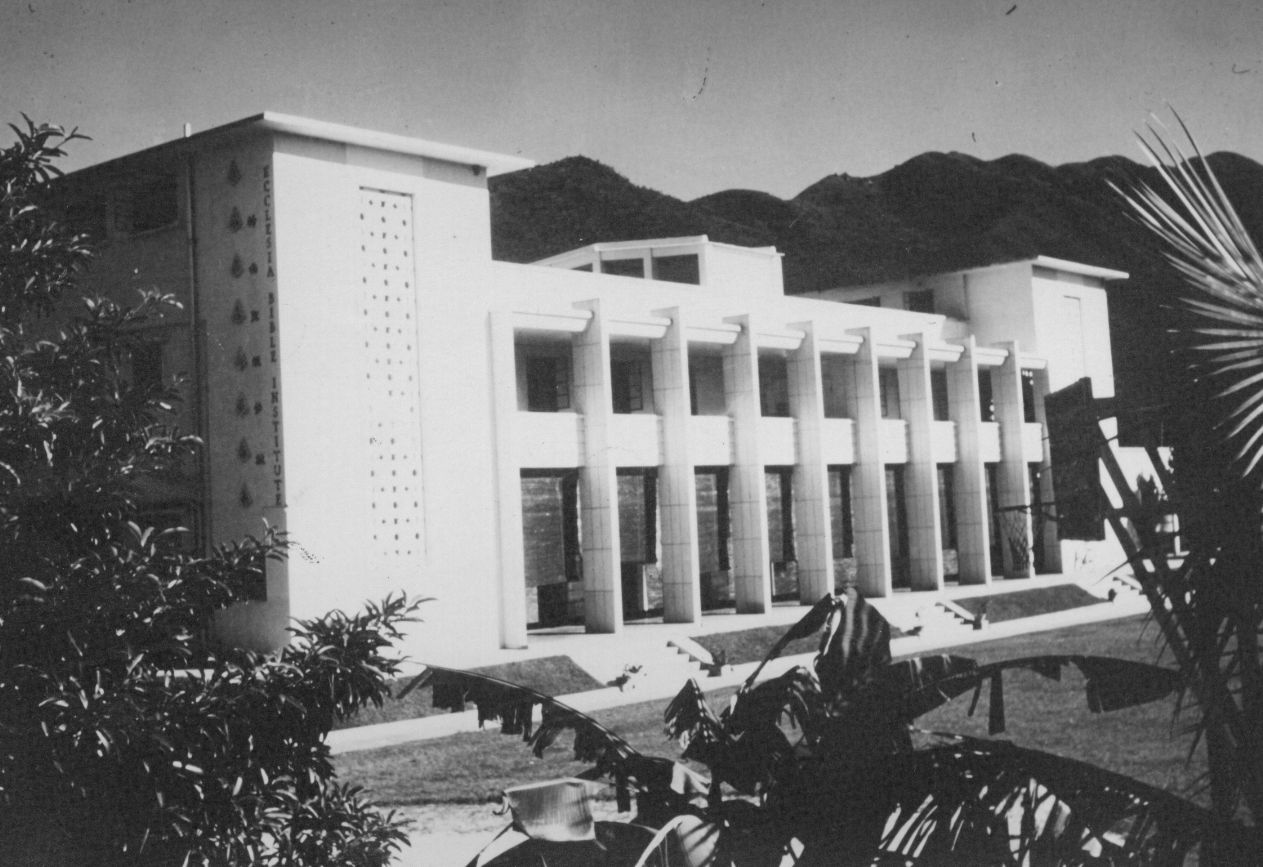
Ecclesia Bible Institute Shatin campus, 1954

The predecessor of the Ecclesia Theological Seminary was the "Ecclesia Bible Institute", founded in Yile Village, Guangzhou, China in 1947 by Rev. J. Elmor Morrison, a missionary of the Assemblies of God from Canada. He was the first president of the institute.

In 1949, due to the change of political situation in China, the school relocated to Cheung Chau, Hong Kong.

In 1953, the school purchased a land of 13 mu in Shatin for the construction of its campus, which opened the following year.

In 1983, the three-year Bible School was transformed into a four-year college offering degree courses and was renamed "Ecclesia Bible College".

In 1990, the college joined the Asia Pacific Theological Association. In 1997, it became an accredited member of the Association.

In 1997, the college started to offer master's degree programs.

In January 2002, the Ecclesia Ministries Limited was established, which then officially took over the ownership and management of the college from the two Assemblies of God missions in the United States and Canada. In the same year, the original school site in Shatin was acquired by Hang Lung Group, which in exchange built the current new campus in Fu Tei, Tuen Mun for the school.

In 2006, the college launched the Doctor of Ministry program, and became the first globally recognized Pentecostal seminary to offer a Doctor of Ministry program in Chinese.

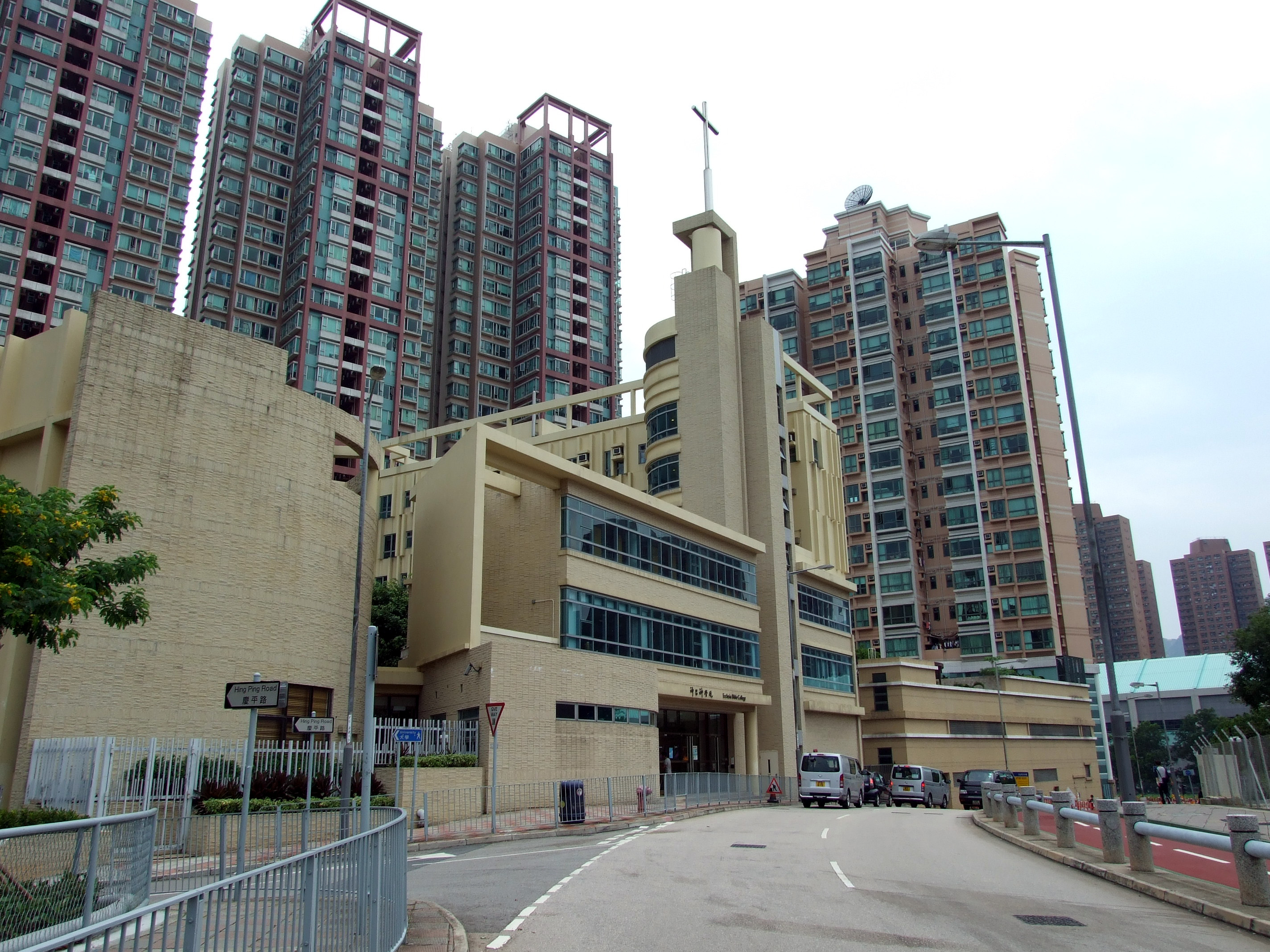
Ecclesia Theological Seminary Tuen Mun New Campus

In 2015, the college changed its English name to "Ecclesia Theological Seminary", while the Chinese name (神召神學院) remained unchanged. The college offered associate, bachelor, master and doctoral degree programs, and had approximately 100 students.

== Programs ==
The college has launched various theological training programs, including Associate of Christian Ministry (A.C.M.), Bachelor of Theology (B.Th.), Master of Christian Ministry (M.C.M.), Master of Divinity (M.Div.), Master of Ministry (M.M.), Master of Pentecostal Charismatic Studies (M. P. C. S) and Doctor of Ministry (D.Min.), and provides online theology courses.

== Current Status ==
The New Campus of the Ecclesia Theological Seminary is located at 22 Tuen Foo Road, Tuen Mun, Hong Kong, adjacent to Siu Hong Station and Tuen Mun Highway. In addition to the auditorium, classrooms, dining hall and dormitory, it also has a baptismal pool and a multi-purpose recording studio. The entire second floor is a library with a collection of over 25,000 books, half in Chinese and half in English, and there is the Pentecostal Resource Centre.

The school's mission is to train Pentecostal leaders for tomorrow. The faculty includes three core lecturers and a number of adjunct lecturers. The current president is Rev. Dr. Yee Tham Wan.

== Academic Recognition ==
Ecclesia Theological Seminary is an accredited institution of the Asia Pacific Theological Association, which is a member of the World Alliance of Pentecostal Theological Education (WAPTE). The school is also an associate member of Asia Theological Association.

== See also ==
- List of Assemblies of God schools
- List of evangelical seminaries and theological colleges
