= Pentecostal Assemblies of Canada =

Pentecostal Christian denomination

The Pentecostal Assemblies of Canada
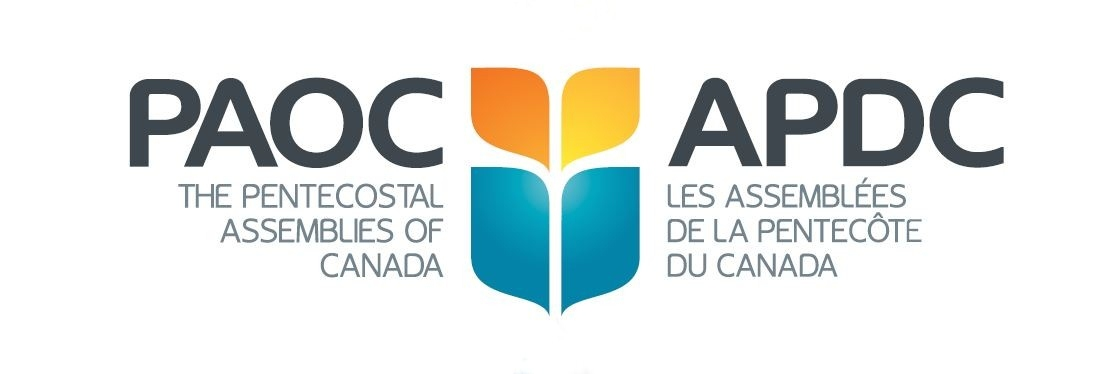
- Classification: Protestant
- Orientation: Pentecostal, Evangelical
- Theology: Finished Work Pentecostalism
- Associations: Evangelical Fellowship of Canada, World Assemblies of God Fellowship, Pentecostal/Charismatic Churches of North America
- Region: Canada
- Headquarters: Mississauga, Ontario
- Origin: 1919
- Separations: Apostolic Church of Pentecost 1921
- Congregations: 1,047
- Members: 271,893
- Seminaries: 8
- Official website: www.paoc.org

The Pentecostal Assemblies of Canada (PAOC) (French: Les Assemblées de la Pentecôte du Canada) is a Finished Work Pentecostal denomination of Christianity and the largest evangelical church in Canada. Its headquarters is located in Mississauga, Ontario. The PAOC is theologically evangelical and Pentecostal, emphasizing the baptism with the Holy Spirit with the evidence of speaking in tongues. It historically has had strong connections with the Assemblies of God in the United States. It is affiliated with the Evangelical Fellowship of Canada and the World Assemblies of God Fellowship.

== History ==
=== Early history (1906-1925) ===
The association has its origins in the adoption of Pentecostal beliefs by various churches in the Ottawa Valley (Ontario), notably through the preaching of Canadian Methodist pastor Robert Edward McAllister who visited the Azusa Street Revival of 1906. McAllister, whose parents were member of the Scottish Presbyterian Holiness movement in Ontario, enrolled at God's Bible School and College in response to his call to ministry. He is viewed by many as the father of Canadian Pentecostalism.

A majority of Pentecostals were found in the prairie provinces due in part to the large numbers of United States immigrants who brought their faith with them. Because of these influences, Canadian Pentecostals maintained close ties to their American counterparts. A 1909 attempt to organize the Pentecostal Movement in the East failed because of opposition against institutionalization. In 1918, however, a decision was made to form the Pentecostal Assemblies of Canada. The association was officially founded in 1919 by 33 churches. At the time, the PAOC adhered to the non-Trinitarian Oneness doctrine and there were plans to join the Pentecostal Assemblies of the World (PAW), another Oneness Pentecostal denomination based in the U.S. However, those plans never materialized, and the Canadian body remained an independent organization with no formal US ties. Around the same time that eastern Pentecostals were creating the PAOC, Pentecostals in Saskatchewan and Alberta were joining the US based Assemblies of God instead.

In 1920, the PAOC chose to affiliate with the Assemblies of God. Pentecostals in the West were incorporated into the PAOC, which continued to function as a distinct sub-division of the Assemblies of God. As a result, the PAOC united most Canadian Pentecostals in one denomination. The Assemblies of God, however, was a Trinitarian fellowship, and the PAOC was required to repudiate the Oneness doctrine and embrace the doctrine of the Trinity. This action resulted in the first major split within Canadian Pentecostalism and the creation of the Apostolic Church of Pentecost in 1921 by former PAOC members. However, a large portion of the Apostolic Church of Pentecost in the east later joined the United Pentecostal Church International.

For the next five years, the PAOC experienced growth. It began a national paper, The Pentecostal Testimony, in 1920 and established a centralized overseas missionary policy for improved effectiveness. In 1925, the PAOC asked to be released from the Assemblies of God over differences in missionary vision. This was granted and was an amiable parting, and the two groups have continued to maintain close ties.

=== Growth (1926-1974) ===
As the movement expanded, the Pentecostal Assemblies of Canada began to include members from across Canadian society, and larger congregations resulted. For example, in 1928 Calvary Temple in Winnipeg, Manitoba, bought the First Baptist Church which seated 1,500 people. In 1935, the PAOC opened Bethel Bible Institute (now known as Horizon College & Seminary) in Winnipeg, Manitoba, which was the first of several Pentecostal institutions dedicated to theological education. As time went on, the PAOC established a stronger financial base allowing for the construction of new buildings. Notably, Central Tabernacle in Edmonton, Alberta (now known as North Pointe) was built in 1972, and Winnipeg's Calvary Temple completed in 1974.

=== Recent history (1979-present) ===
Facing the same challenge of many Canadian churches in the latter years of the 20th century, the PAOC worked hard to continue its growth. Under the leadership of General Superintendent James MacKnight (1983-1996), 102 additional churches were added to the PAOC. A greater emphasis on international missions work since that time has led to growth overseas. According to Statistics Canada, Pentecostal growth has varied (statistics Canada does not collect data specific to the PAOC, but as by far the largest Pentecostal group in Canada, it is likely to reflect the statistics regarding Canadian Pentecostals). The 1991 census showed a 29% increase. Between 1991 and 2001, the census reported a 15% decline to 369,480 adherents (Extrapolating the percentage growth indicates approximately 435,000 +/-2,500 adherents in 1991).

While self-reported statistics from the PAOC show plateaued growth, the 2011 census indicates 478,705 adherents - a 29% increase over 2001, and 10% increase over 1991 census data. The Evangelical Fellowship of Canada has pointed out that changes to choices available on census forms over the years brings into question the accuracy and usefulness of Statistics Canada data on evangelical denominations, so it is likely PAOC data is a more accurate measure. The PAOC had "fewer than 225,000 members and adherents as of 1994". According to a census of the association of churches in 2022, it would have 1,047 churches and 271,893 members.

== Beliefs ==
In 2022 the PAOC revised its essential doctrines in a "Statement of Essential Truths". This statement removed remaining traces of dispensationalism in the PAOC's doctrine, most notably removing the denomination's belief in the pre-tribulation rapture of the Church (individual congregants and ministers may still hold this doctrine, but it is no longer an essential doctrine of the denomination).

The PAOC is trinitarian, finished-work, and pentecostal. As such, the denomination's beliefs are in line with the pentecostal tradition, and the much broader tradition of protestant Christianity.

The PAOC affirms the doctrine of the Trinity, and that the Bible, both Old and New Testaments, is the written revelation of God’s character and saving purposes for humanity and for all creation. The Bible is the full and final authority for all Christian doctrine.

The PAOC teaches that on the Day of Pentecost, Jesus poured out the promised Holy Spirit on the church. Jesus continues to baptize in the Holy Spirit those who are believers, as his return approaches. This empowers the church to continue its work of proclaiming with speech and action the good news of the arrival and coming of the kingdom of God. This experience is available for everyone, male and female, of every age, status, and ethnicity. The sign of speaking in tongues indicates that believers have been baptized with the Holy Spirit and signifies the nature of Spirit baptism as empowering our communication, to be his witnesses with speech and action as we continue to pray in the Spirit.

The PAOC's stated eschatology consists of a "great hope" for the imminent return of Christ in the air to receive his own, both the living who will be transformed, and the dead in Christ who will be resurrected bodily. Christ will complete at his second coming the restoration begun when he initiated God's kingdom at his first coming. Christ will liberate creation from the curse, fulfil God's covenant to Israel, and defeat all powers that oppose God. Every knee will bow and every tongue will confess that Jesus Christ is Lord, to the glory of God the Father.

The PAOC ordains both men and women, believing that all followers of Christ may be empowered by the Holy Spirit for ministry and witness regardless of any external barriers including gender, age, ethnicity, etc.

== Structure ==
=== Local churches ===
The Pentecostal Assemblies of Canada is organized as a "cooperative fellowship". At the local level, Pentecostal Assemblies adhere to congregational polity. Congregations appoint pastors, elect governing boards, and manage their own local affairs.

=== Districts and branches ===
Local churches are organized into geographical middle judicatories called districts. A district is governed by a biennial conference, a representative body composed of credential holders with voting privileges and local church delegates. Districts examine and recommend credentials for ministers and elect their own officers. District executives have oversight over all activities of the PAOC within district borders. A branch is a non-geographical administrative unit equivalent to a district; however, a branch's activities are confined to certain ethnic or language groups.

== District Offices ==
- British Columbia & Yukon District
- Alberta & Northwest Territories District
- Saskatchewan District
- Manitoba & Northwestern Ontario District
- Western Ontario District
- Eastern Ontario & Nunavut District
- Quebec District
- Maritime District

=== General Conference ===
The governing body of the Pentecostal Assemblies of Canada is the General Conference which meets regularly every two years. It includes all ordained ministers, other credential holders, credentialed missionaries, and some ex officio members serving in official capacities. Each local church is entitled to appoint one lay delegate to the General Conference, and churches with more than 200 members are entitled to send one additional lay delegate per every 100 members.

The General Executive consists of the Executive Officers, district superintendents, the regional directors of international missions program, five additional credential holders elected by the General Conference, and three lay persons elected by the General Conference. The executive officers include the general superintendent, the assistant general superintendent for fellowship services, and the assistant general superintendent for international missions, all of which are elected by the General Conference.

=== General Superintendents ===
- George A. Chambers (1919-1920)
- Hugh M. Cadwalder (1920-1923)
- George A. Chambers (1924-1934)
- James Swanson (1935-1936)
- Daniel N. Buntain (1937-1944)
- Campbell B. Smith (1945-1952)
- Walter E. McAlister (1953-1962)
- Tom Johnstone (1963-1968)
- Robert W. Taitinger (1969-1982)
- James M. MacKnight (1983-1996)
- William D. Morrow (1997-2008)
- David R. Wells (2008-)

== Education ==
It has 8 Bible colleges.

- Summit Pacific College, Abbotsford, British Columbia which includes a Graduate School, formerly a separate institution named Canadian Pentecostal Seminary.
- Pentecostal Sub-Arctic Leadership Training (S.A.L.T.) College, Fort Smith, Northwest Territories, Northwest Territories
- Vanguard College, Edmonton, Alberta
- Horizon College and Seminary, Saskatoon, Saskatchewan
- Master's College and Seminary, Peterborough, Ontario
- Aboriginal Bible Academy, Deseronto, Ontario
- Global University Canada, Toronto, Ontario
- Quebec Bible Institute, Longueuil, Quebec
