= North Pointe Community Church =

Coordinates: 53.6271°N 113.5645°W

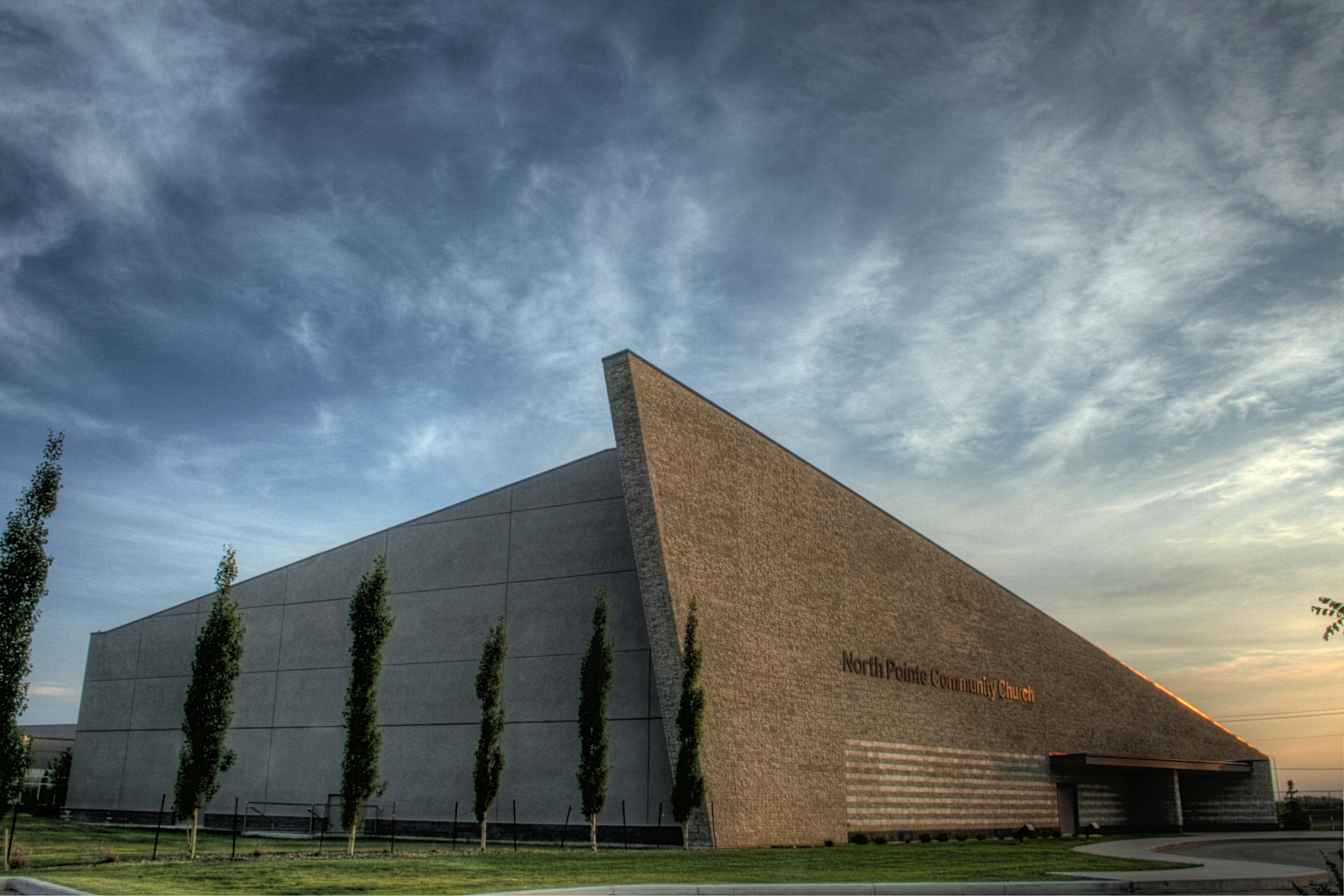
- North Pointe Community Church building
- North Pointe Community Church
- Location: Edmonton
- Country: Canada
- Denomination: Pentecostal
- Churchmanship: Evangelicalism, Pentecostalism
- Website: np.church

History
- Founded: 1917
- Founder: John McAlister

North Pointe Community Church is an evangelical pentecostal church affiliated with the Pentecostal Assemblies of Canada, in Edmonton, Alberta, Canada. Its senior pastor is Mike Voll.

== History ==
The church was founded in 1917 by Pastor John McAlister under the name of Bethel Pentecostal Assembly. In 1933, the church was renamed Edmonton Pentecostal Tabernacle and a new building was inaugurated. In 1963, the church was renamed Edmonton Central Pentecostal Tabernacle. A new building (the “Square building”) with a seating capacity of 1,000 people was designed by Peter Hemingway and dedicated on October 4, 1964. In 1972, the “Pyramid building”, with a seating capacity of 1,800 was inaugurated. In 1985, the attendance was 1,249 people. In 2006, the “Square building” and the “Pyramid building” were sold, and the church opened a new building in the north of Edmonton.
