= Peter Hemingway =

British architect

- Born: 1929; Minster, Kent
- Died: 15 May 1995 (aged 65–66); Edmonton, Alberta
- Education: Rochester Technical College
- Occupation: Architect
- Awards: Massey medal, Prix du XXe siecle
- Buildings: Yellowknife Courthouse
- Projects: Muttart Conservatory
- Design: Central Pentecostal Tabernacle

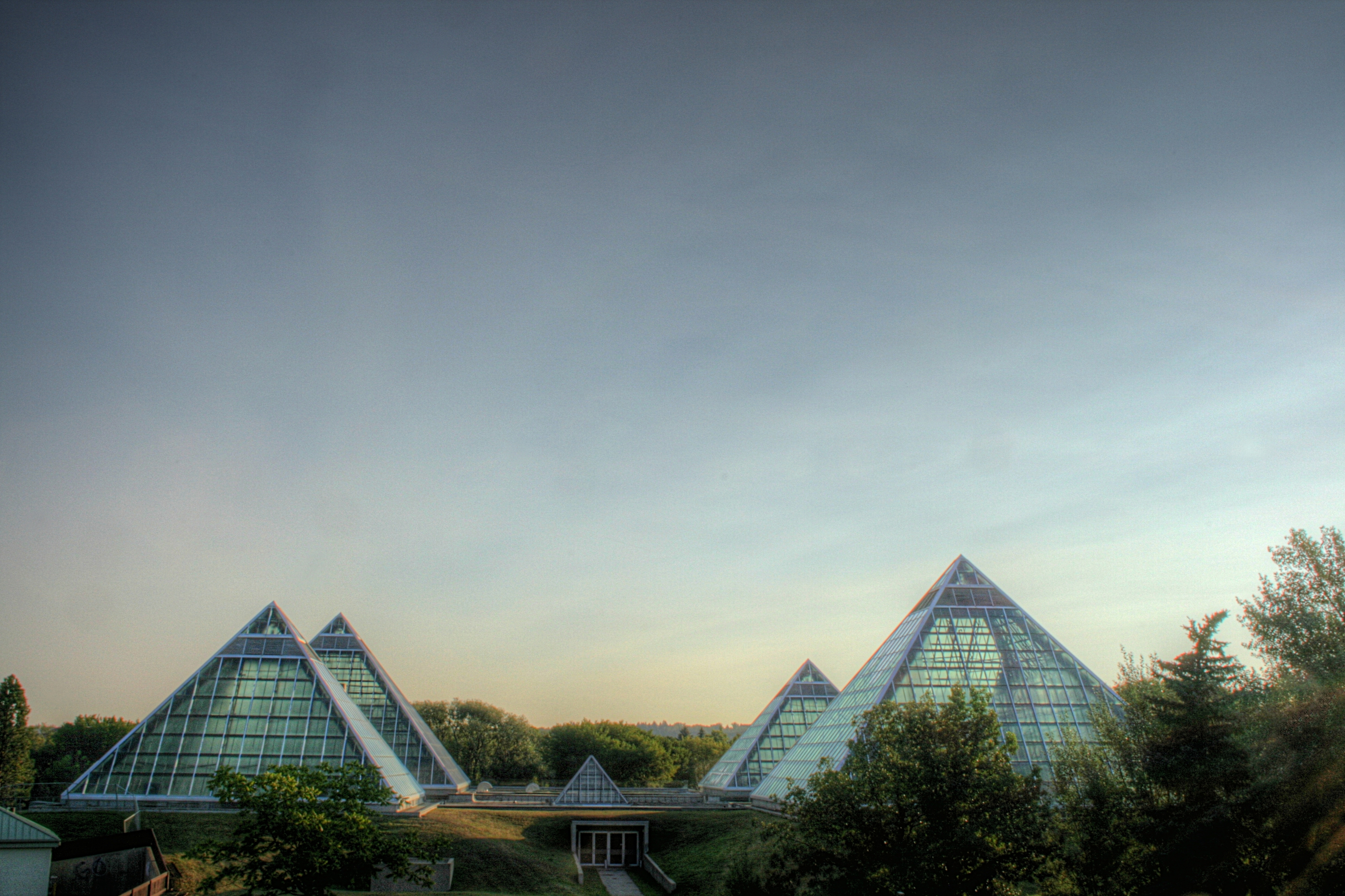
Muttart Conservatories in the North Saskatchewan River valley of Edmonton, Alberta

Peter George Hemingway (1929 – 15 May 1995) was a British architect who practiced mainly in Canada and designed many public works, including the Muttart Conservatory and the Central Pentecostal Tabernacle.

== Biography ==
Hemingway was born in Minster, Kent. After gaining a diploma from Rochester Technical College, he immigrated to Canada in 1955. Serving briefly in the Alberta Department of Public Works, Hemingway founded his own practice in 1956. Hemingway won the Massey medal twice for his architecture projects. He died on 15 May 1995.

== Projects ==
Hemingway designed and was awarded the Massey Medal for the Stanley Engineering Building (1968) and the Peter Hemingway Fitness and Leisure Centre (1968-1970), which was formerly known as Coronation Pool and renamed after the architect in 2007. However, his most well-known and recognizable building is probably the Muttart Conservatory, a group of pyramid-shaped greenhouses in the Edmonton river valley. He was also the architect of the Central Pentecostal Tabernacle in Central Edmonton which was demolished in 2007 despite attempts for it to be given protective status. In 1982 he served as President of the Alberta Association of Architects. He was a frequent contributor to professional publications.

Projects include:

- Stanley Engineering Building (1968)
- Coronation Pool (1970); now Peter Hemingway Aquatic Centre
- Central Pentecostal Tabernacle (1972)
- Strathcona County Fire Department Station 1 (1975)
- Muttart Conservatory (1976)
- Yellowknife Court House
- St. Peter Evangelical Lutheran Church
- RCMP building or Hemingway Centre
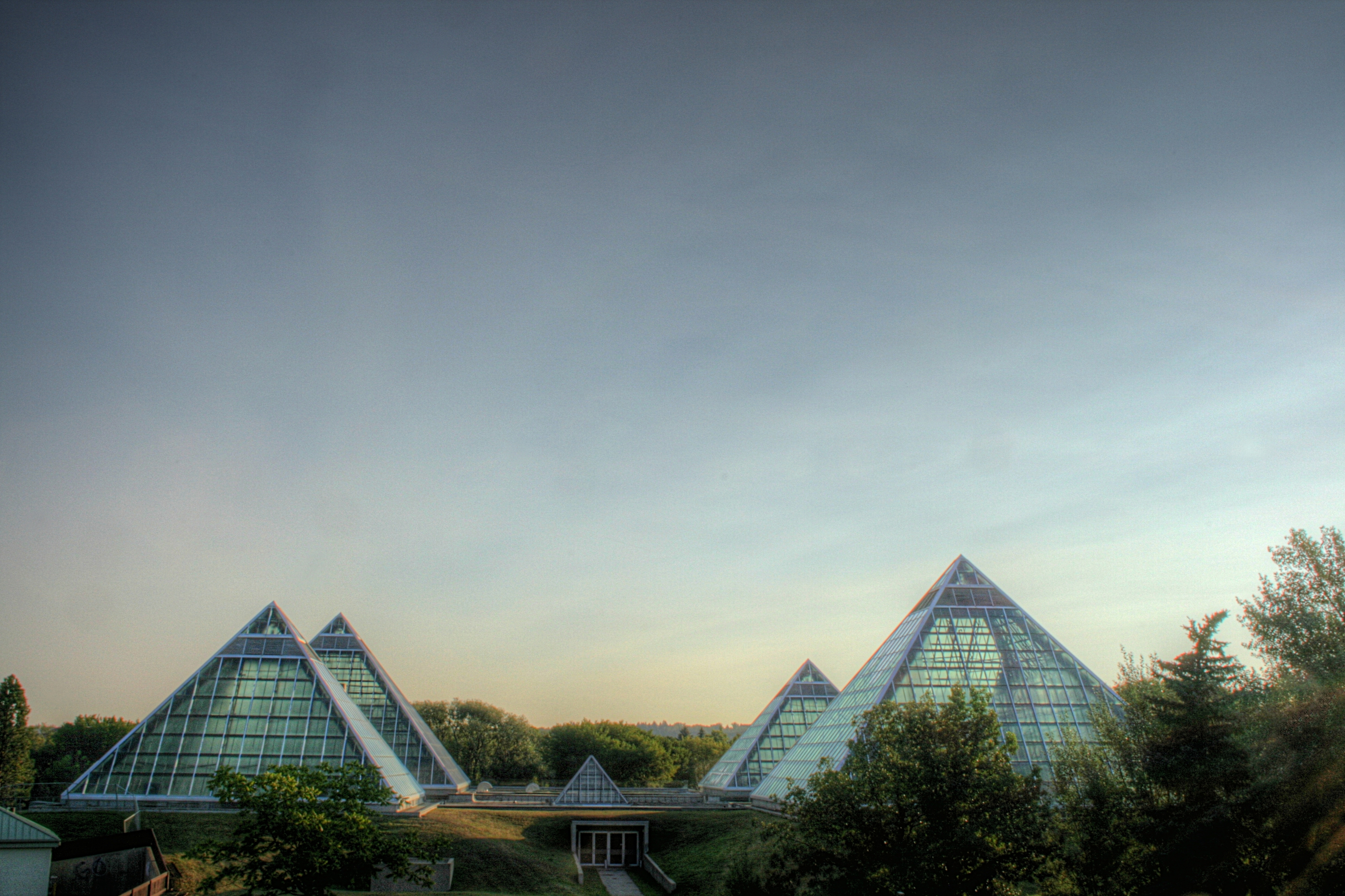
Muttart Conservatories

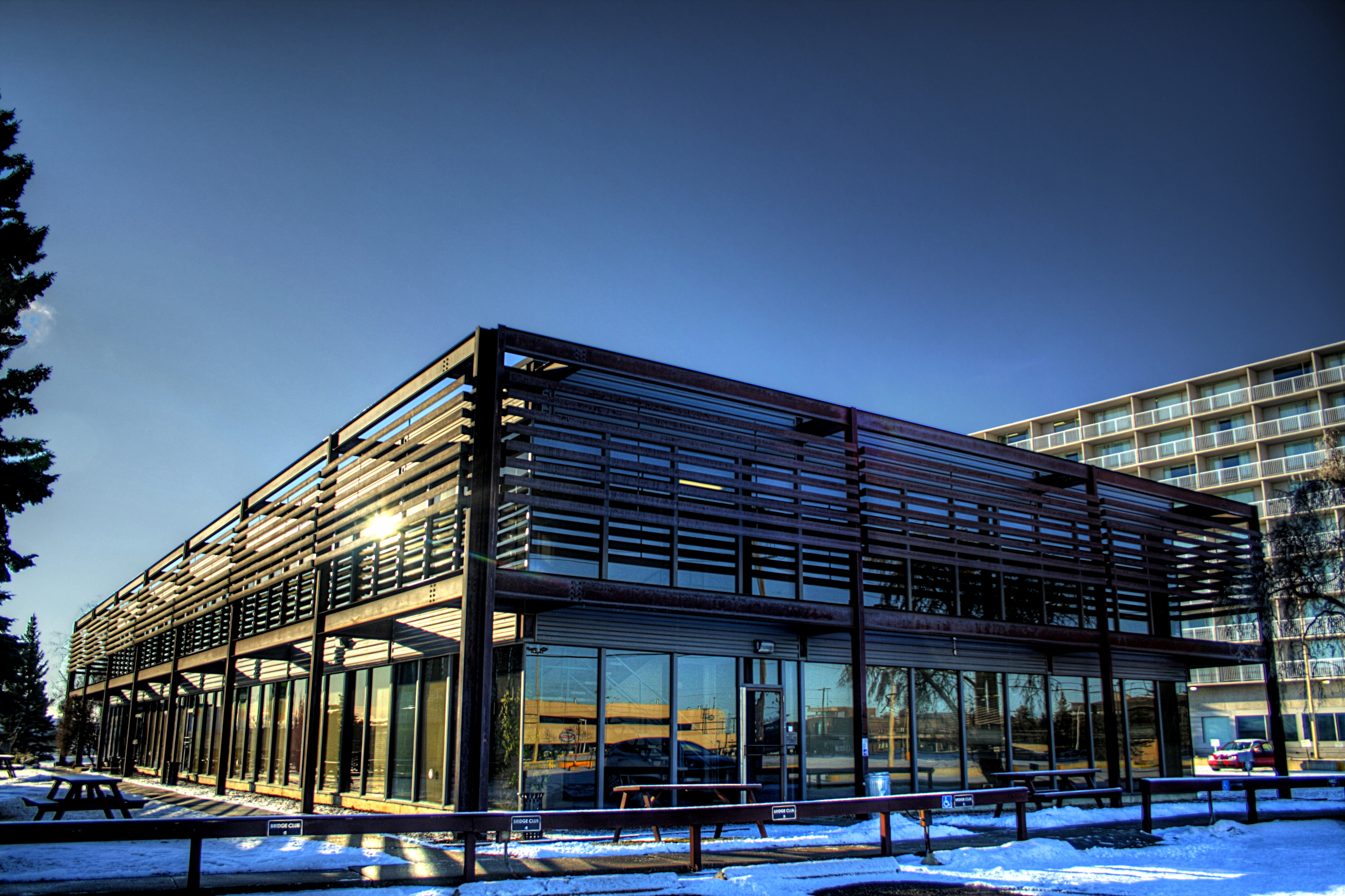
Stanley Engineering Building

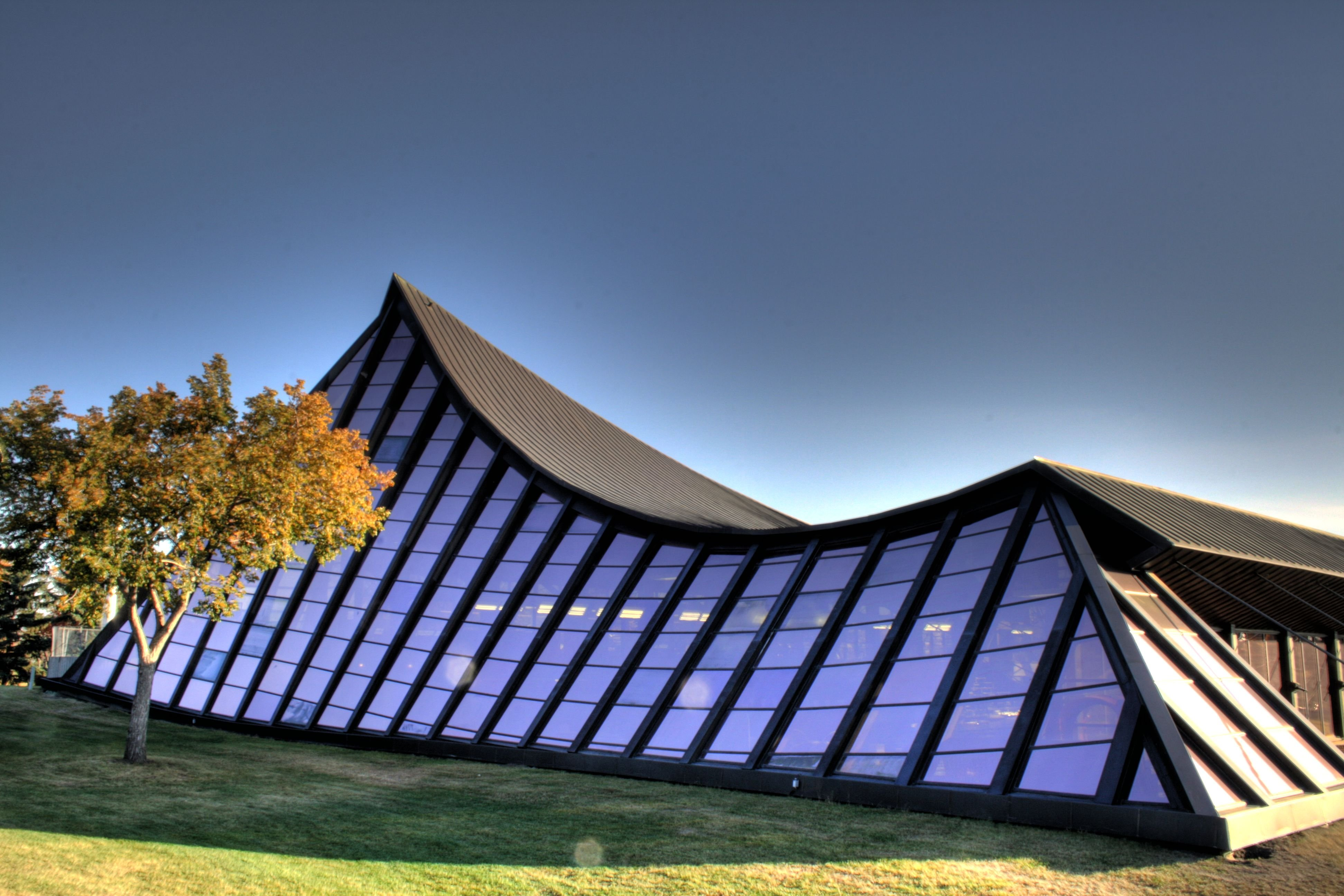
Peter Hemingway Fitness and Leisure Centre
