= Master's College and Seminary =

Theological institute in Ontario, Canada

Coordinates: 44.32145°N 78.3197°W

- Motto: We Picture Change
- Type: Private Bible college and seminary
- Established: 1939 as Ontario Pentecostal Bible College; 1948 name changed to Eastern Pentecostal Bible College; 1996 Canadian Pentecostal Seminary began 2001, merger
- Affiliations: Pentecostal Assemblies of Canada, Association for Biblical Higher Education, CHEC
- Academic affiliations: Tyndale University
- President: Dr. Jeromey Martini
- Academic staff: 5 core and 25 adjuncts 1 Dean and various adjuncts (seminary)
- Students: 250
- Location: Mississauga and Toronto, Ontario, Canada
- Campus: Urban
- Colours: Grey and burgundy
- Website: www.mcs.edu

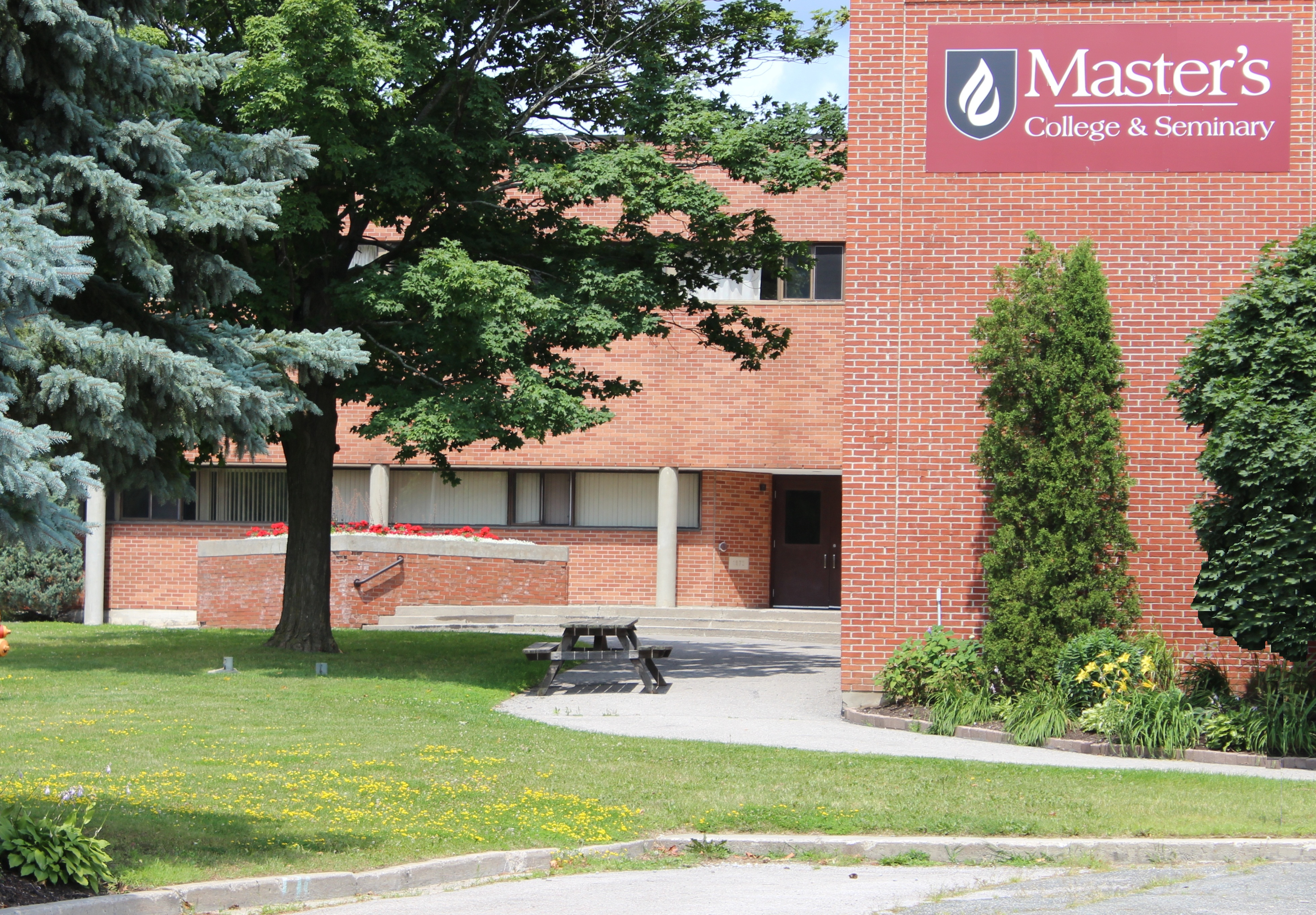
MCS administration building

Master's College and Seminary (MCS) is Pentecostal theological institute in Mississauga and Toronto, Ontario, that consists of a residential Bible college, a church-based seminary in Toronto affiliated with Tyndale Seminary at Tyndale University, and the Pentecostal Assemblies of Canada.

== History ==
The creation of Master's College and Seminary brought together the two primary Pentecostal Assemblies of Canada (PAOC) schools in Eastern Canada. The college began as Ontario Pentecostal Bible School in 1939 in Toronto, Ontario.

In 1948, to reflect the expansion of the school's constituency to include the Maritime District of the Pentecostal Assemblies of Canada as well as the PAONL, the name was changed to Eastern Pentecostal Bible College. In 1951, the Board of Directors authorized the purchase of Nicholls Hospital in Peterborough and relocated the college to Peterborough, where it became a residential institution.

In 1981, the Nicholls Hospital was torn down and was replaced by a new dorm residence for men and women. In 1984, EPBC launched a Bachelor of Theology degree program.

Master's Seminary originated in 1996 as Canadian Pentecostal Seminary (CPS), which was an initiative of the national office of the PAOC to provide training within a Pentecostal context for those with a university degree who were preparing for ministry.

In partnership with Tyndale Seminary (formerly Ontario Theological Seminary), an expansion campus was established in British Columbia in association with the ACTS consortium at Trinity Western University. The original campus became known as CPS East, while the new campus was named CPS West.

By affiliating with local seminaries, the two CPS campuses were able to offer accredited courses and programs under the auspices of established schools without the cost associated with building a self-standing seminary. However, this model would not last long due to disagreement about whether campuses should be governed nationally or regionally. In 1999, governance of the two campuses were formally separated. CPS East serviced a district from Ontario to the Maritimes. CPS West serviced a district from Manitoba to British Columbia.

In 2000, Eastern Pentecostal Bible College was merged with Canadian Pentecostal Seminary/East. The merged institution was renamed Master's College and Seminary on June 29, 2001. Soon after, all operations were consolidated in Toronto. The former property in Peterborough was eventually sold.

In the summer of 2010, MCS moved back to Peterborough, becoming the anchor tenant in the same buildings which had previously been sold. Classes commenced there in fall 2010.

In 2021, they celebrated its 25th anniversary as a seminary under the direction of the Dean, Dr. Van Johnson.

== See also ==
- Higher education in Ontario
