= Horizon College and Seminary =

Coordinates: 52.11319°N 106.63291°W

- Former names: Central Pentecostal College, Bethel Bible Institute
- Motto: "Advancing God’s Kingdom by preparing competent Christian leaders for Spirit-empowered life and ministry"
- Type: Private Christian college
- Established: 1935
- Affiliations: Association for Biblical Higher Education Association of Theological Schools
- Academic affiliations: University of Saskatchewan
- President: Jeromey Martini
- Administrative staff: Susan Wendel, Dean of Seminary; Andrew Gabriel, VP Academics
- Location: 604 Webster Street, Saskatoon, Saskatchewan, Canada
- Campus: Urban
- Website: www.horizon.edu

Horizon College and Seminary is a multi-denominational Evangelical Christian College in Saskatoon, Saskatchewan, Canada.

== History ==
Horizon College and Seminary originated as a small school known as Bethel Bible Institute, that George Hawtin began in Star City, Saskatchewan, in 1935. George Hawtin, the local pastor, moved the school to Avenue A and 29th Street Saskatoon in 1937. In 1945, the college became the property of the Pentecostal Assemblies of Canada. In 1947, the college came under the direction of the Saskatchewan District of the Pentecostal Assemblies of Canada. In 1962, its name was changed to Central Pentecostal College, under the joint sponsorship of the Manitoba & Northwestern Ontario and Saskatchewan Districts of the Pentecostal Assemblies of Canada.

From 1963 to 1974, the college purchased the former Lutheran Theological Seminary building and some land just off 8th Street East. A new residence was erected in 1969 which can house seventy-two students. From 1974 to 1984 a 150-seat lecture theatre, an expanded library, and a new office complex were added to the existing education building. Central Pentecostal College was granted Affiliate College status by the University of Saskatchewan on July 1, 1983.

On May 1, 2007, the college changed its name from Central Pentecostal College to Horizon College and Seminary as it began offering some graduate courses toward the ATS-accredited Master of Divinity, Master of Arts in Christian Studies, and Master of Arts in Theological Studies degree programs at Providence Theological Seminary. Significant improvements have been made under President Martini. At the 2014 fundraising gala events in Winnipeg and Saskatoon, the College announced it would be switching its curriculum to a competency-based curriculum in Fall 2015, naming the campaign Horizon 8.0. The impetus behind the shift to CBE (competency-based education) was ensuring that students graduate having demonstrated their abilities according to six competencies that ministry practitioners have identified as necessary for success in Christian life and ministry. These include biblical and theological literacy, ministry development, leadership and administration, spiritual maturity, skilled communication, and contextual awareness.

== Affiliations ==
Horizon College and Seminary is affiliated with the University of Saskatchewan in Saskatoon, Saskatchewan, Canada. Therefore, its students have access to the University of Saskatchewan campus. In addition, the college is a theological college of The Pentecostal Assemblies of Canada. Horizon has also had a longstanding agreement in partnership with Lutheran Theological Seminary (LTS) and the Saskatoon Theological Union (STU) to take courses at Horizon towards the Master of Divinity degree at Lutheran Seminary.

Although Horizon was exclusively affiliated with the Pentecostal Assemblies of Canada, the school recently began to seek partnerships with other denominations. Between 2018 and 2019, Horizon became officially affiliated with the Canadian Conference of Mennonite Brethren Churches, the Church of God in Western Canada, and the Christian and Missionary Alliance. This allows Horizon to offer multi-denominational programming, including credential tracks, in four different denominational streams.

Horizon College and Seminary is accredited by the Association for Biblical Higher Education. More recently, the school has also gained status as an associate member of the Association of Theological Schools (ATS) in the United States and Canada and is currently pursuing full accreditation with this association.

== Campus ==
Previously, Horizon College and Seminary was located in a quiet residential neighborhood at the corner of Jackson Avenue and 7th Street East in Saskatoon, Saskatchewan. The campus included men's and women's residences, prayer chapels, a dining room, lounges, and laundry facilities, classrooms, lecture theater, offices, a bookstore, and the college chapel.

In 2021, HCS moved to a new facility located at 604 Webster Street, just off Attridge Drive in northeast Saskatoon. The move has located the school in closer proximity to its partner institutions like the University of Saskatchewan and Saskatchewan Polytechnic. The new campus does not have dorms, but accommodates out-of-town students by connecting them with a list of close-by rental properties.

== Notable alumni ==
- Scott Gillingham, mayor of Winnipeg
