= Muttart Conservatory =

Botanical garden in Edmonton, Alberta, Canada

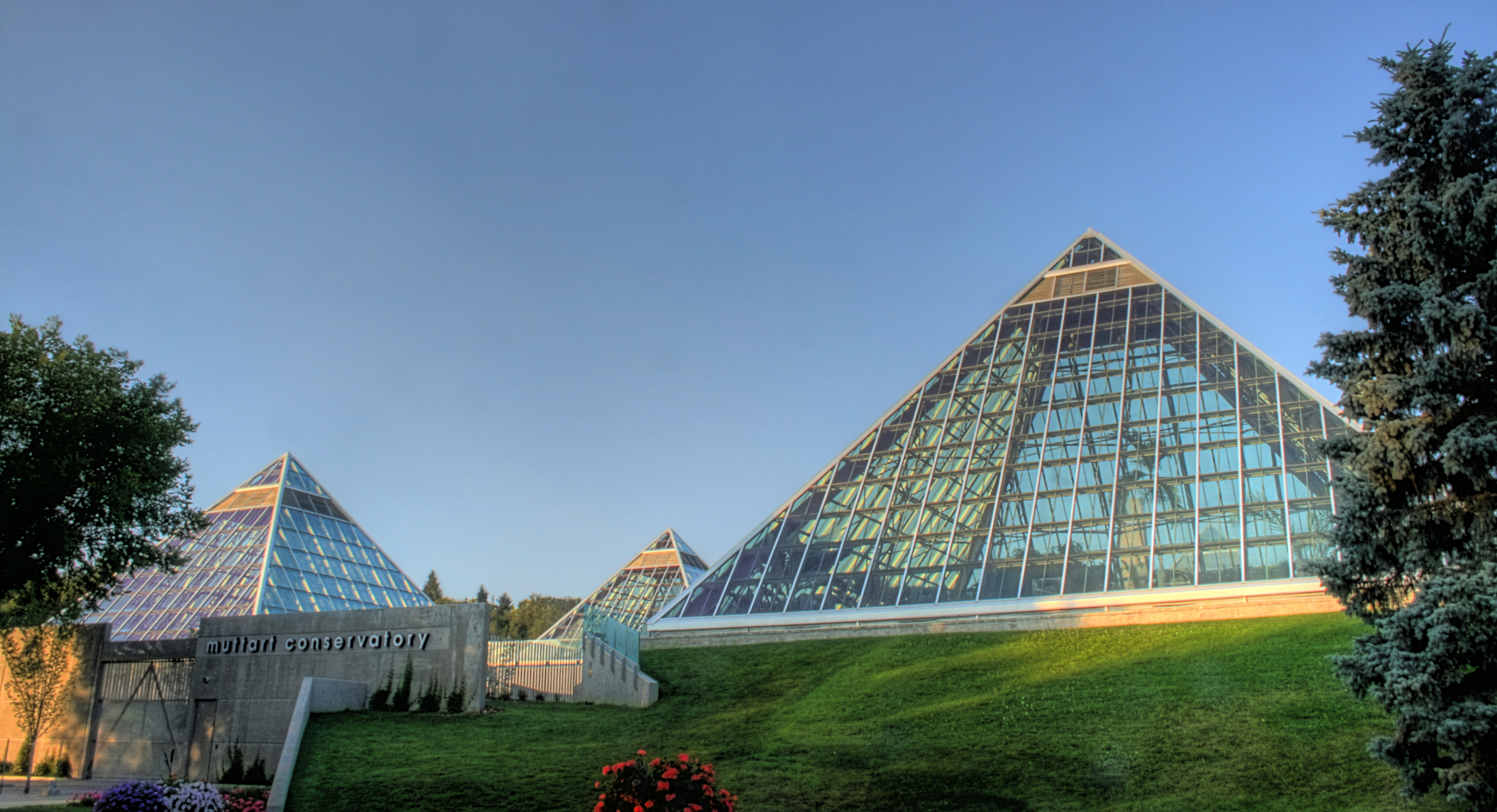
- Muttart Conservatories entrance in August 2009

- Location in Edmonton
- Established: 1976; 50 years ago
- Location: 9626 96A Street NW, Edmonton, Alberta
- Coordinates: 53.53522°N 113.47650°W
- Type: Botanical garden
- Visitors: 100,000
- Architect: Peter Hemingway
- Owner: City of Edmonton
- Public transit access: Muttart stop
- Parking: On site (no charge)
- Website: Muttart Conservatory

The Muttart Conservatory (/məˈtɑːrt/) is a botanical garden in the North Saskatchewan River valley, across from the downtown core in Edmonton, Alberta, Canada. One of the best-known landmarks of Edmonton, the conservatory consists of three city-operated greenhouses, public gardens, as well as four feature pyramids for display of plant species found across three biomes, with the fourth pyramid hosting a seasonal display. A fifth minor skylight pyramid lights up the central foyer.

A donation from the Gladys and Merrill Muttart Foundation provided momentum for the conservatory's construction, with the remaining funding supplied by the Government of Alberta and the City of Edmonton. The conservatory is staffed and operated by the Edmonton Parks and Recreation Department.

== Architecture ==
The conservatory's unusual structure, designed by architect Peter Hemingway, is composed of four glassed pyramids built around a central service core. The two larger pyramids are 660 square metres (7,100 ft^{2}) in area, and the two medium-sized ones are 410 square metres (4,400 ft^{2}) in size. Three of the pyramids are devoted to displays of plants from the tropical, temperate, and arid regions respectively, the fourth being used for shows that change with the seasons and which feature massed displays of ornamental flowering plants.

== Biomes ==
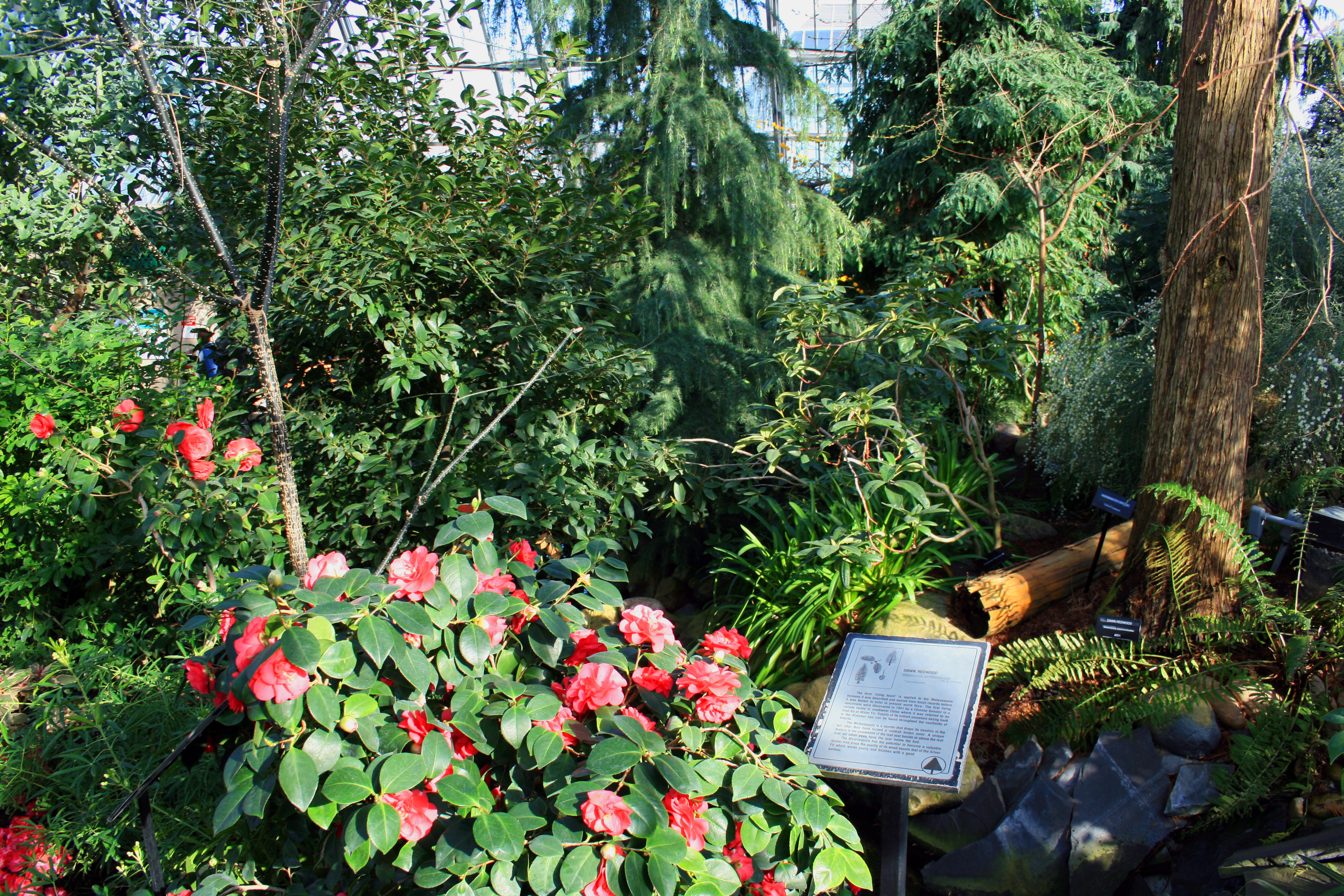
Plants and shrubs of tropics inside of Muttart Conservatory

The Temperate pyramid houses plants typical of temperate climates, from such zones as the southern Great Lakes, Australia, and even the mountainous areas of Asia. Near the entrance and fed by a stream is a bog area, with white water lilies and parrot's feather. The bog merges into a woodland with mostly eastern deciduous trees and low shrubs but including redwoods, cedars, and pampas grass. Eucalyptus trees and flowering shrubs complement the Australian section. In the woodland floor and alpine section are many tiny flowering plants, some native to Alberta and others from all over the world. Carefully controlled environmental conditions allow the plants to go dormant in winter and burst into spring growth of green leaves and colourful blooms. The plants from the Arid pyramid come from hot and cold dry areas spanning five continents. They share an ability to thrive in environments with dry air, irregular moisture and wide day/night temperature fluctuations. In spring 2013, the Arid Pyramid featured an Agave Americana plant bloom which reached a height of 30 feet before reaching the top of the pyramid. This plant was planted a year after the Muttart Conservatory first opened.

The Tropical pyramid provides an enormous diversity of species; under a canopy of tall palms, banana and weeping fig are orchids, various hibiscus and the bird of paradise. The plants come from tropical rainforests, evergreen forests or grasslands, and are often showy and bright. A waterfall cascades into the centre of the pyramid where small fish and water lilies make their home. This pyramid has also been home in the past to a kiwi bird and a sloth. On March 11, 2013, the bud to an imported Amorphophallus titanum plant (commonly known as the corpse flower) budded and bloomed here on April 22.

The Feature pyramid offers seasonal displays that change several times per year, focusing on themed displays and seasonal celebrations.

Other amenities at the facility are an outdoor gazebo, gift shop, and the Culina Muttart Café. The café serves several menu items made with locally sourced ingredients, including herbs and salad greens grown on-site at the greenhouse.

The facility, owned and operated by the City of Edmonton, is also a popular site for special events, such as weddings. The conservatory underwent a $6.3 million renovation that was completed in June 2009.

== See also ==
- List of botanical gardens in Canada

== Picture gallery ==
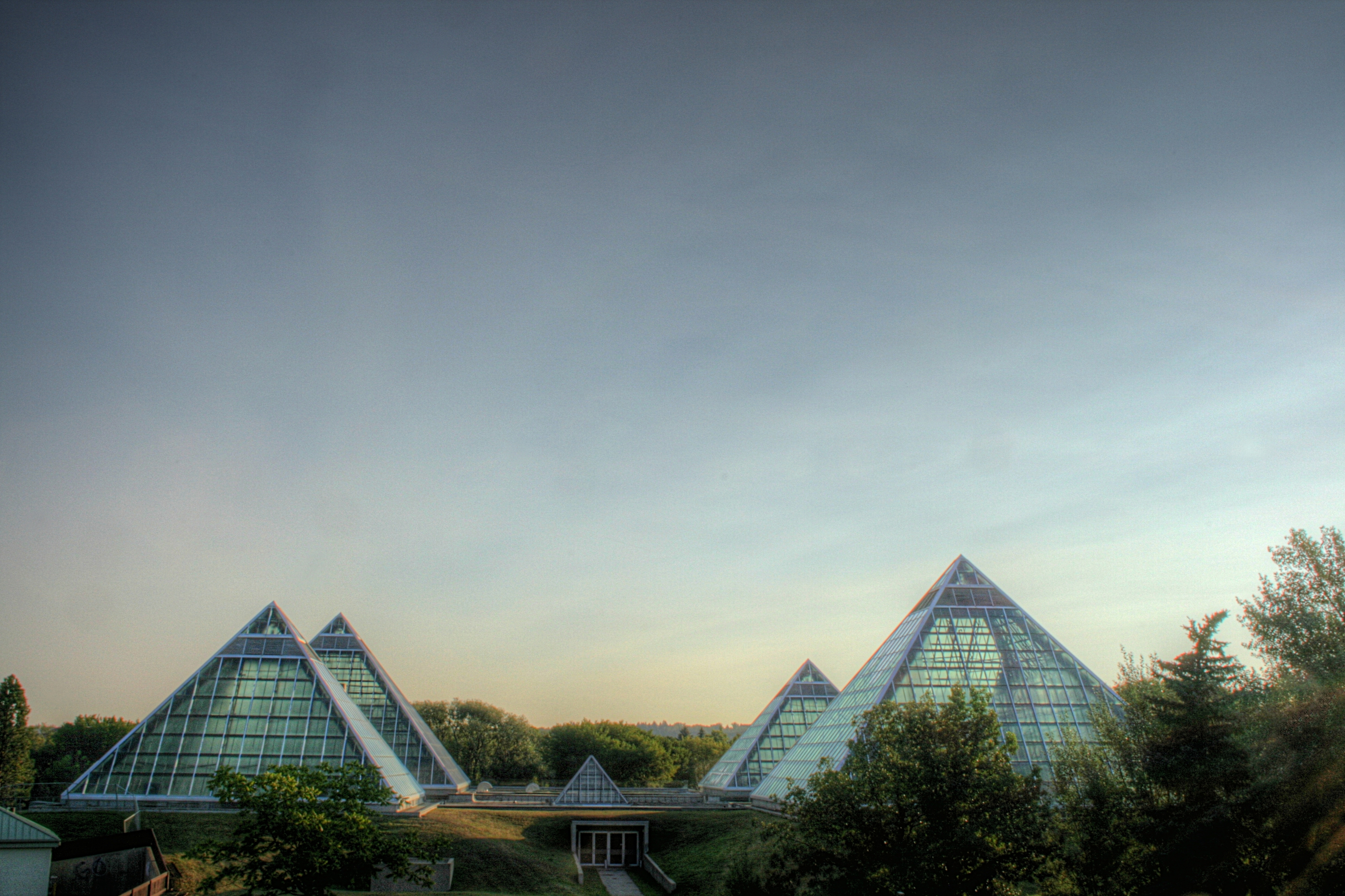
Dawn at the Muttart Conservatory

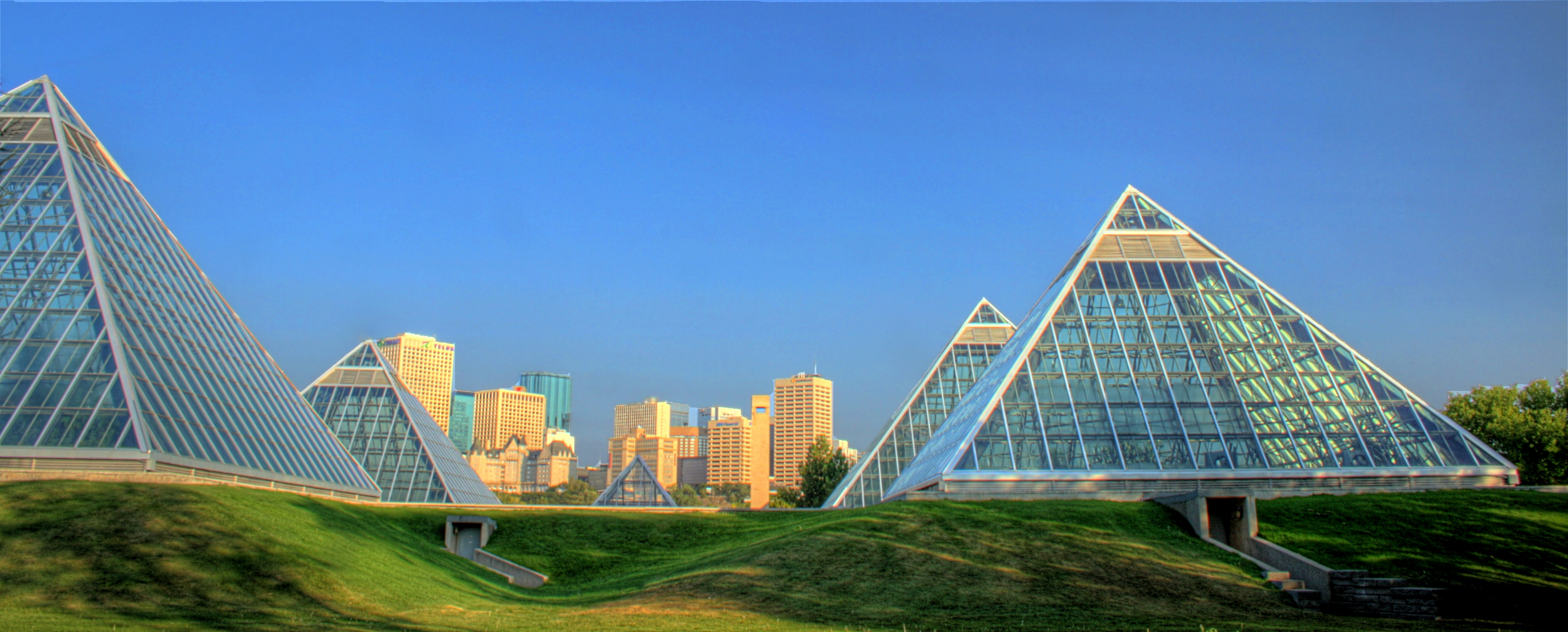
Muttart Conservatory with downtown Edmonton in distance

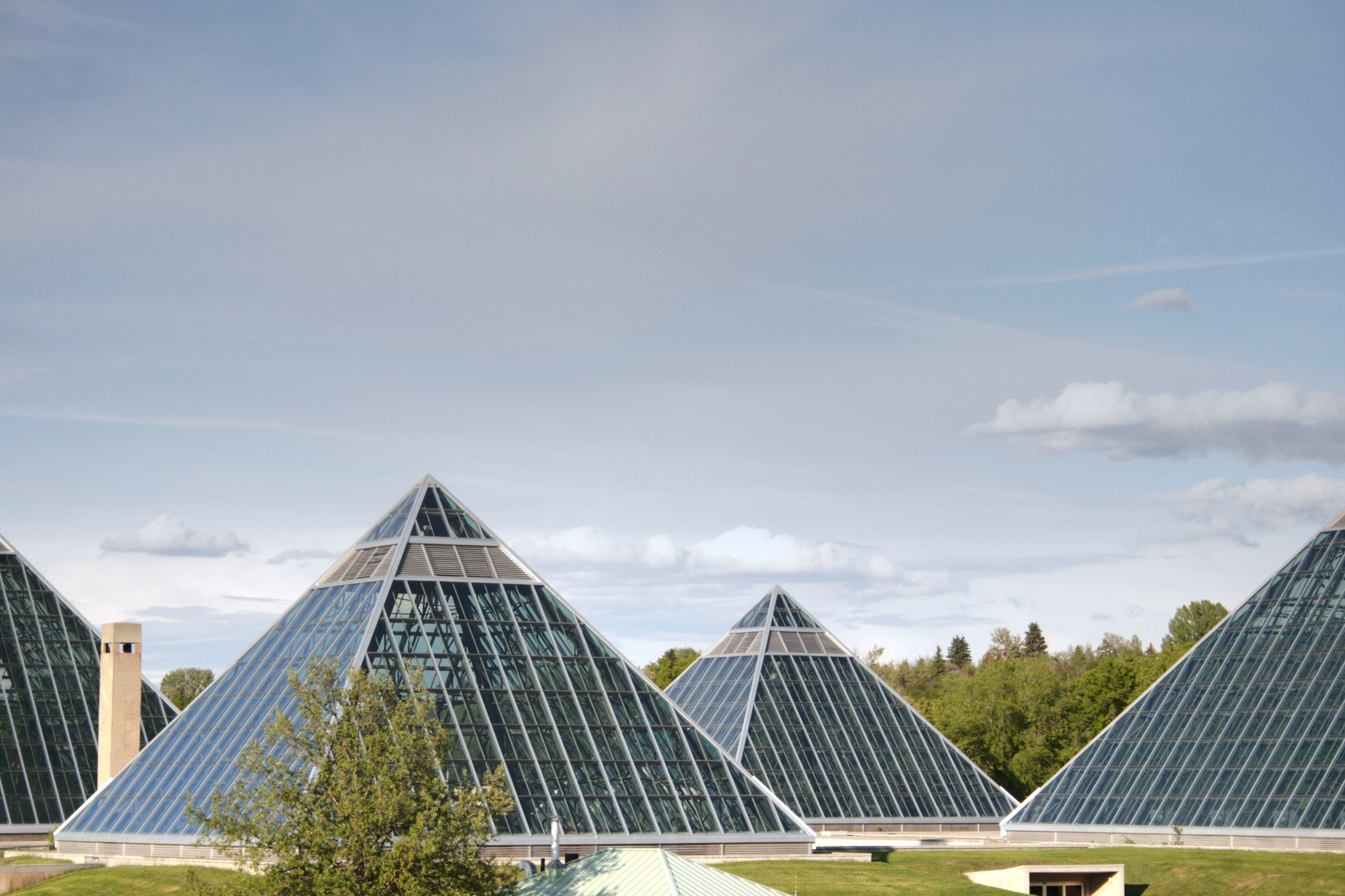
Pyramid buildings of the Muttart Conservatory

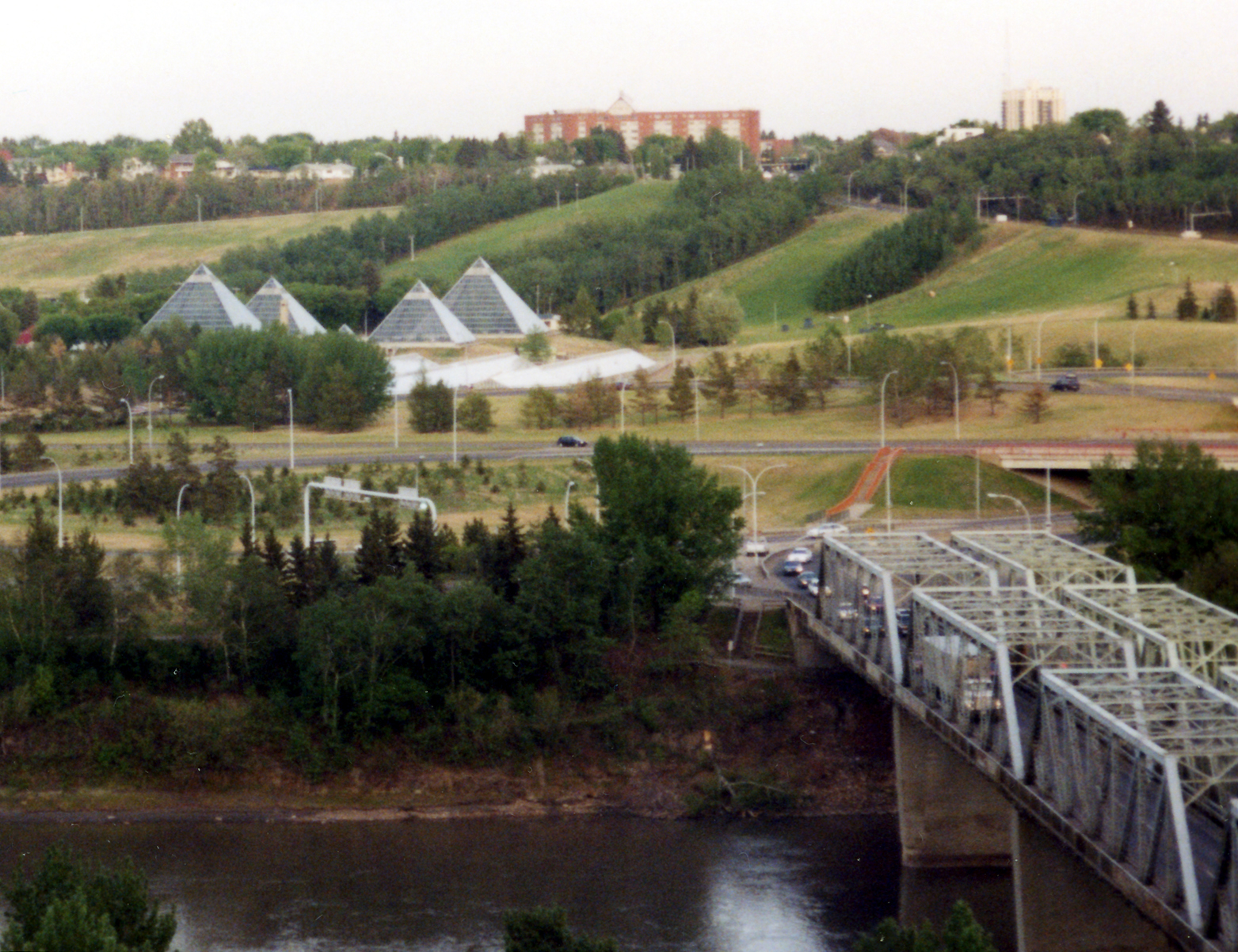
Muttart Conservatory from north side of North Saskatchewan River

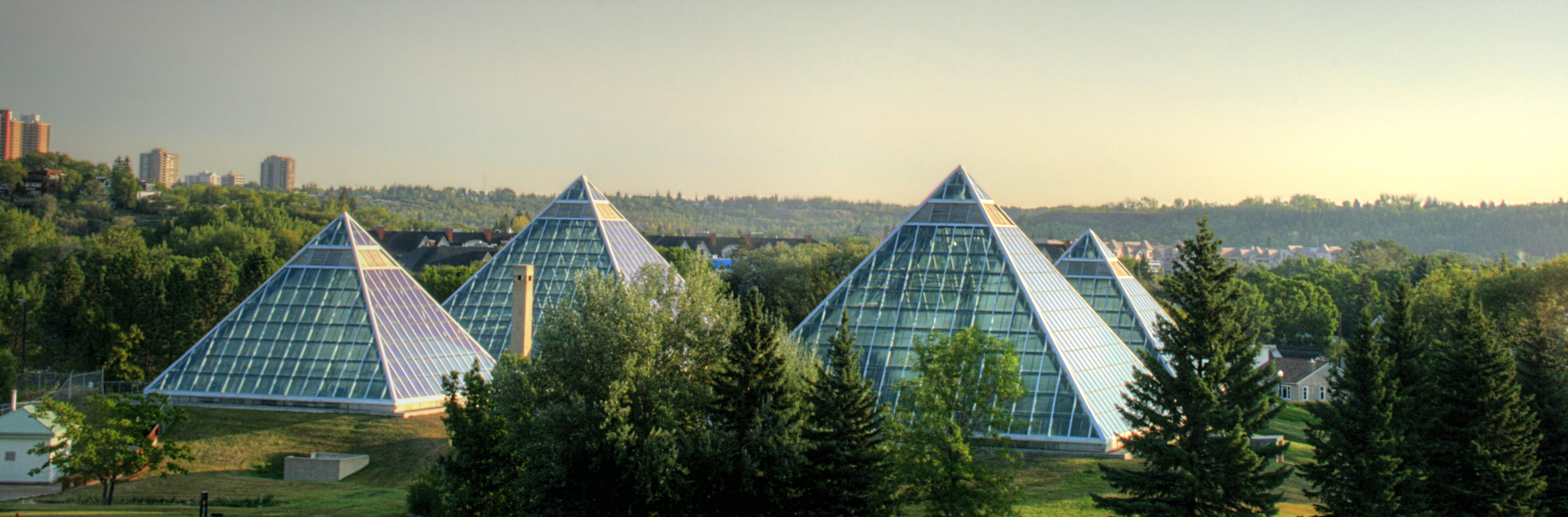
The Muttart Conservatory

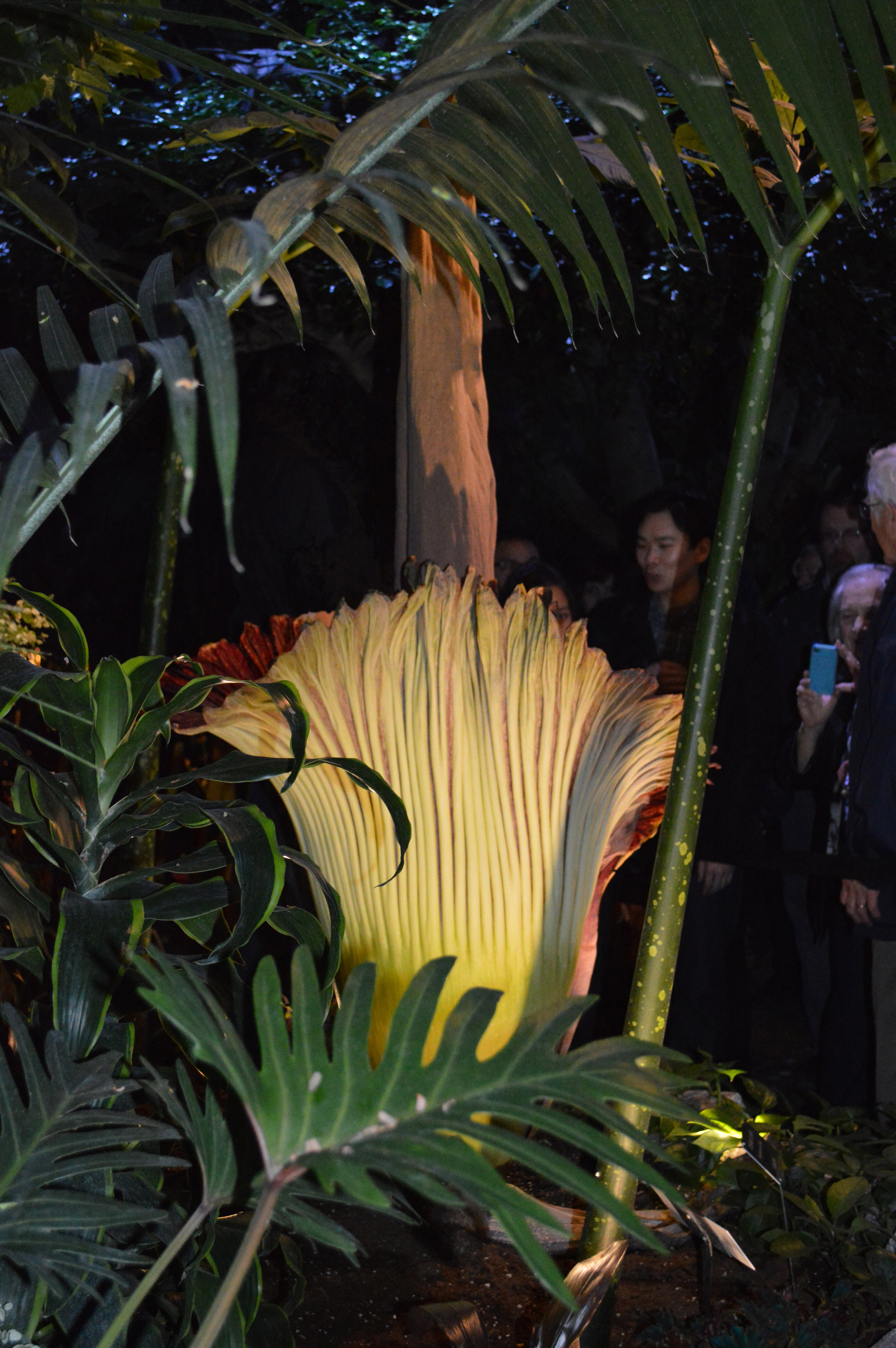
Amorphophallus titanum flower at Muttart, 2015

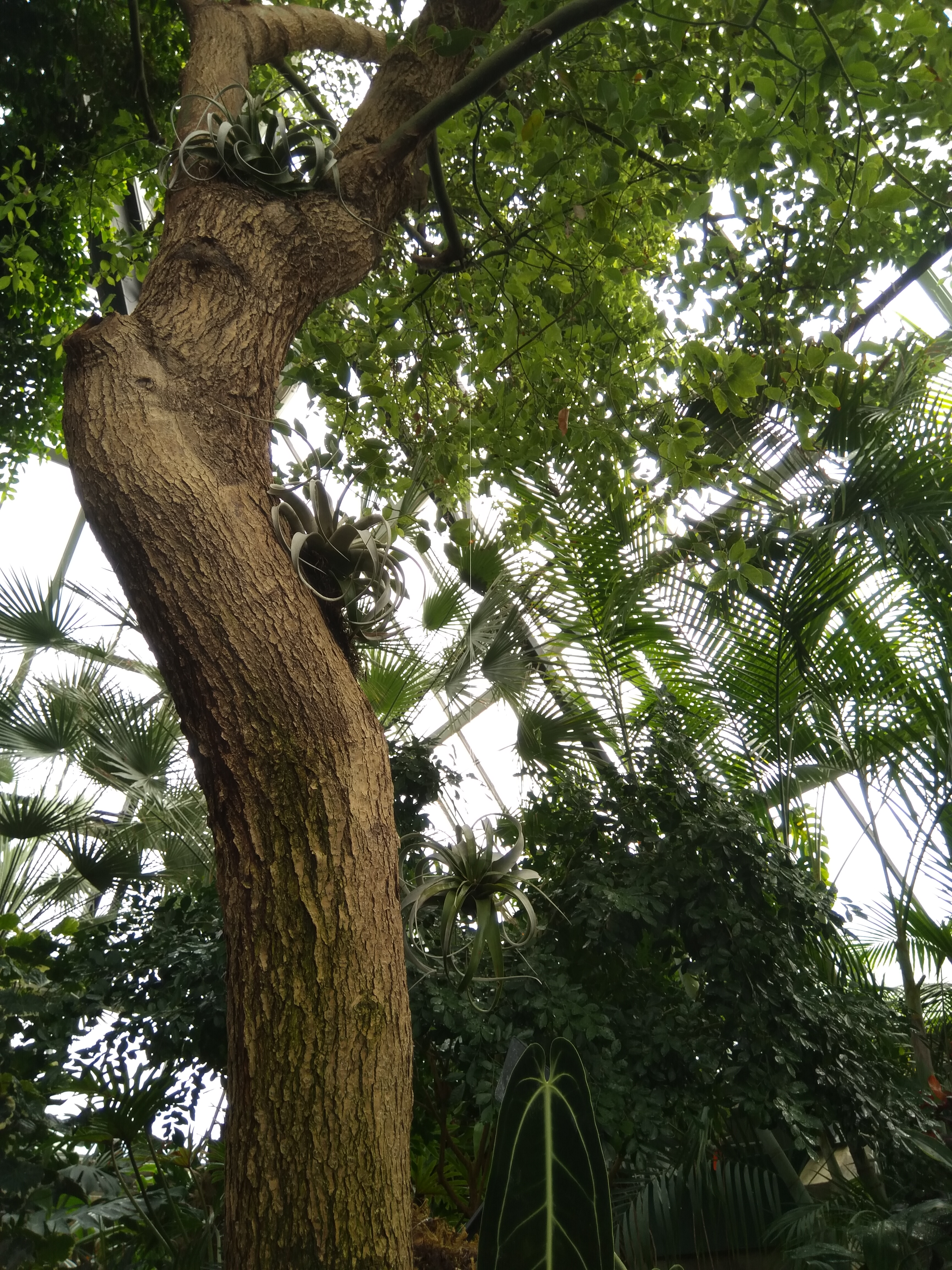
A camphor tree in the tropical section.
