= Charles H. Strickland =

Charles H. Strickland (1916–1988) was a minister, missionary, college president, author, and general superintendent in the Church of the Nazarene.

Strickland was married to Fannie K. Strickland. Together they served in the Church of the Nazarene for over fifty years. Among that service included pastoring in Georgia and Texas and missionary service to South Africa. He also served as the first president of Nazarene Bible College in Colorado Springs. Strickland was elected General Superintendent in 1972 served for sixteen years in the denomination's highest elected office until his death in 1988.

Strickland authored one book and contributed to another. He wrote African Adventure published in 1959 by the Nazarene Publishing House as a denominational missionary reading book and contributed to Sanctify Them...That World May Know: Twelve Holiness Sermons (ISBN 0834112019) which was published in 1987.
