= International Council for Evangelical Theological Education =

- Abbreviation: ICETE
- Formation: May 1980; 46 years ago
- Type: Non-governmental organization
- Region served: 113 countries
- Members: 850 schools
- Website: icete.info

The International Council for Evangelical Theological Education (ICETE) is an International evangelical Christian organization of Bible colleges. It is a member of the World Evangelical Alliance.

== History ==
The organization has its origins in a project of regional evangelical theological institute networks in the 1970s. In 1980, it was officially founded by the Theological Commission of the World Evangelical Alliance. In 2025, it had 850 member schools in 113 countries and 80,000 students.

== Governance ==
The governance of the organization is ensured by a director and regional directors in the 8 Continental Regions Members.

== Affiliations ==
The organization is a member of the World Evangelical Alliance.
