= TCA College =

Seminary in Singapore

- Type: Seminary
- Established: 1979
- President: Rev Dr Dennis Lum
- Location: Singapore, Singapore; 1.331°N 103.889°E
- Website: www.tca.edu.sg

TCA College in Singapore is an accredited multi-disciplinary college founded by Trinity Christian Centre (Singapore) in 1979. It started as a Bible College in Singapore and is now one of the largest local Pentecostal/Charismatic accredited institutions.

== History ==
In 1979, TCA College began as a vision conceived by Naomi Dowdy, former Senior Pastor of Trinity Christian Centre and Chancellor of the College, for the purpose of providing ministerial training with the Bachelor of Theology program and other degree programs so as to advance the Gospel message and to amply prepare leaders for service to churches and the Christian community.

Initially called Trinity School of the Bible, the school was located at 23 Adam Road, the site of Trinity Christian Centre. An initial cohort of 120 students was enrolled in 1983, when the school was renamed to Theological Centre for Asia (TCA).

In response to the need of its community, the Bachelor of Ministry was launched in 1990, along with the Diploma in Theology and Bachelor of Theology programs. In 1992, TCA introduced the Masters in Bible and Missions (currently named Master of Arts in Intercultural Studies); in 1995 the Master of Divinity; in 2000 the Master of Arts in Ministry. In 2007, the Bachelor of Ministry program was assimilated into the Bachelor of Theology program.

The Chinese Department started in 1997 with the Certificate in Ministry and Master of Arts in Ministry programs. The Diploma in Theology and Bachelor of Theology were later introduced in 1999, and the Bachelor of Ministry and Master of Divinity was launched in 2005. In 2012 Term 3, School of Theology Chinese launched her MTh program.

Rev Dominic Yeo, who was appointed and installed as Vice-Chancellor in 2005, helped birth the vision to for a multi-disciplinary college, consisting of four schools: School of Counseling, School of Creative Arts, School of Leadership and School of Divinity. This expansion took place under the leadership of Wilson Teo, the third President of TCA (installed in 2006). To mark this expansion, the name of TCA was changed to TCA College.

In 2007, TCA College moved to a new and larger campus within Trinity@Paya Lebar at 249 Paya Lebar Road, where it is currently based. During the same period, the School of Leadership at TCA College, in partnership with Azusa Pacific University (APU), began the Master of Arts in Organizational Leadership program.

Recognition was conferred by the Singapore Association for Counseling (SAC) to the School of Counseling for its Post Graduate Diploma program in 2011. The Center for Counseling was also inaugurated and designated as a centre where clinical and professional counseling services are provided for members of the broader community. In November 2013, the Master of Arts in Counseling program was given the same recognition by the SAC.

== Schools and current programs ==
=== School of Theology ===
The School of Theology provides seminary education to train both pastors and lay people for ministry.

The English Department offers the following programs: Certificate in Ministry, Diploma in Theology, Bachelor of Theology, Graduate Diploma in Christian Studies, Master of Arts in Intercultural Studies, Master of Arts in Ministry, and Master of Divinity.

The Chinese Department offers several programs in Mandarin: Certificate in Ministry, Diploma in Theology, Bachelor of Theology, Graduate Diploma in Christian Studies, Master of Arts in Ministry, Master of Divinity, and Master of Theology.

=== School of Counseling ===
The School of Counseling offers a Master of Arts in Counseling and a Master of Arts in Pastoral Counseling. These programs provide faith-based counselor training that meets professional benchmarks set by the Singapore Association for Counselling (SAC) and the International Registry of Counsellor Education Programs (IRCEP).

=== School of Leadership ===
The School of Leadership offers a fully online Master of Arts in Christian Leadership. This is a joint program with Life Pacific University in the US.

== Accreditations and partnerships ==
TCA College is recognized by Ministry of Education (Singapore) as a religious school. Its programs are also globally recognized by Asia Pacific Theological Association, Asia Theological Association, Life Pacific College, USA, and Singapore Association for Counselling.

== Location ==
TCA College is located at Paya Lebar Singapore. The building is also located along the Circle MRT line, between the MacPherson MRT station and Tai Seng MRT station.
