= Native American Bible College =

Coordinates: 34.8702°N 79.1512°W

Lumbee River Christian College
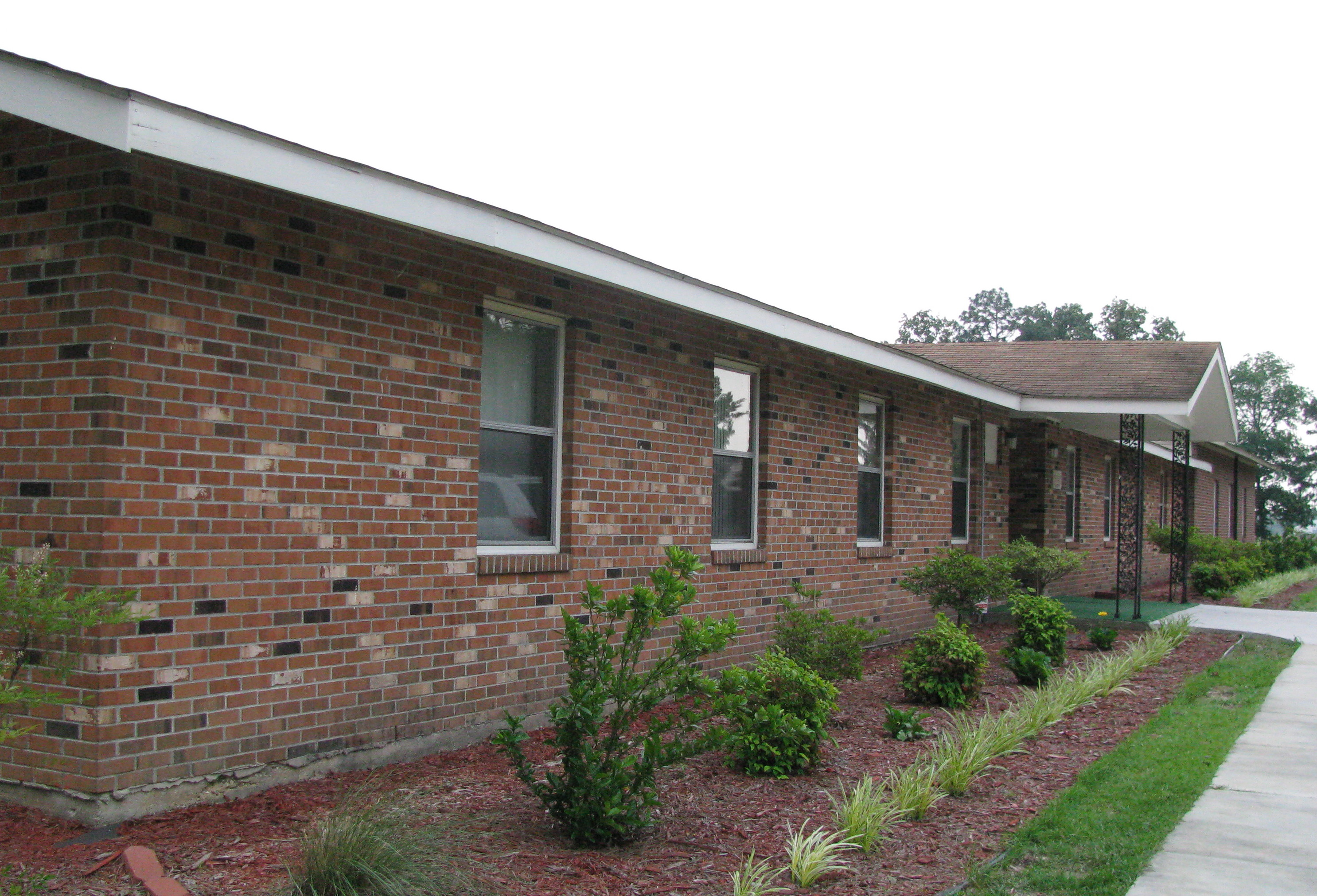
- Type: Private
- Established: 1968
- Affiliations: Assemblies of God USA
- President: Rev. Esa Ontermaa
- Vice-president: Dr. John Davis
- Students: 47 (according to ABHE)
- Location: Shannon, NC, 28386 US, Shannon, North Carolina
- Colors: Teal and Gray
- Website: www.lumbeeriver.edu

Lumbee River Christian College formerly the Native American Bible College (NABC), located in Shannon, North Carolina. It is affiliated with the Assemblies of God USA. While the primary purpose of NABC is to train the Native Americans to reach their own people, the College welcomes students from all ethnic backgrounds.

== Purpose statement ==
It is the purpose of Native American Bible College of the Assemblies of God, Inc. (NABC) to equip Christians, particularly Native American Christians, through collegiate education in a Pentecostal environment to be effective in ministry to God, the Church, and the world. NABC shall remain loyal to the teachings of the Assemblies of God as set forth in the Sixteen Fundamental Truths.

Although NABC exists to train Native Americans, the school welcomes students from all races and ethnic backgrounds.

== History ==
Both written records and personal recollections affirm that the desire to establish a Bible college to meet the spiritual needs of the Indian population in Southeastern North Carolina was planted by God in many hearts. Originally known as Eastern Indian Bible Institute, Native American Bible College was founded in Fayetteville, North Carolina, in January 1968. It was approved and supported by five Assemblies of God networks. For over nine years, night classes were held in three Indian churches in the area: Fayetteville Assembly of God, Faith Assembly of God in St. Pauls, and Shannon Assembly of God.

In 1975, one hundred acres of land, located in Shannon, North Carolina, was purchased for a campus site. In 1977, NABC expanded its program to include a three-year day program in addition to the night classes being offered. In 1978, a multipurpose building was constructed, containing classrooms, offices, a library, and a chapel. In 1990, the Charles Cookman Residence Hall was completed. In 1993, the College transitioned from a North Carolina District sponsored school to a regional school, sponsored by five Southeastern Districts of the Assemblies of God. In 1994, the Board of Directors changed the name of the school from Eastern Indian Bible Institute to Native American Bible College. The same year, a cafeteria was added to the campus. In 1998, a classroom building, with a seating capacity of 150 students, was completed, and the original building was remodeled. In 2000, the multipurpose building was enlarged to accommodate the expanding library. In 2001, a chapel (later named Peter Knutsen Chapel) was erected. In 2006, a second dormitory, including a student center, was completed.

In 2004-05, a fourth year was added, and NABC had its first Bachelor of Religious Education degree graduates in Spring 2005. Over the years adequate facilities, including a centrally located, easily accessible library, have been developed on the campus.

In 2018, about 70% of students were Lumbee, while other attendees included other Native American, ethnic minorities and white students.

== Degrees offered ==
Native American Bible College offers a 4-year Bachelor of Religious Education degree with a dual-major. The first major taken by all students is in Bible. In addition, the student may choose a second major in Ministerial Studies, Christian Education, or Missions. The academic program prepares the student for service and leadership in the church and the world.

NABC also offers a 2-year Associate of Religious Education degree.

== Accreditation ==
Native American Bible college is accredited by the Commission on Accreditation of the Association for Biblical Higher Education to grant certificates and degrees at the Associate and Baccalaureate levels.

== Presidents ==
- Rev. Charles Hadden (January 1968 – June 1977)
- Rev. Rodger Cree (July 1977 – June 1982)
- Rev. Roy Clark (July 1982 – July 1984)
- Rev. Hollis Stanford (July 1984 – June 1986)
- Rev. Charles Cookman (July 1986 – December 1990)
- Rev. David Dalton (January 1991 – December 1992)
- Rev. James Kelly (January 1993 – December 2005)
- Rev. Paul Kaminer (January 2006 – July 2007)
- Rev. Gilbert Walker (September 2007 – December 2009)
- Rev. James Kelly (December 2009 – June 2010)
- Rev. James Keys (June 2010 – present)
