= Shannon, North Carolina =

- CDP
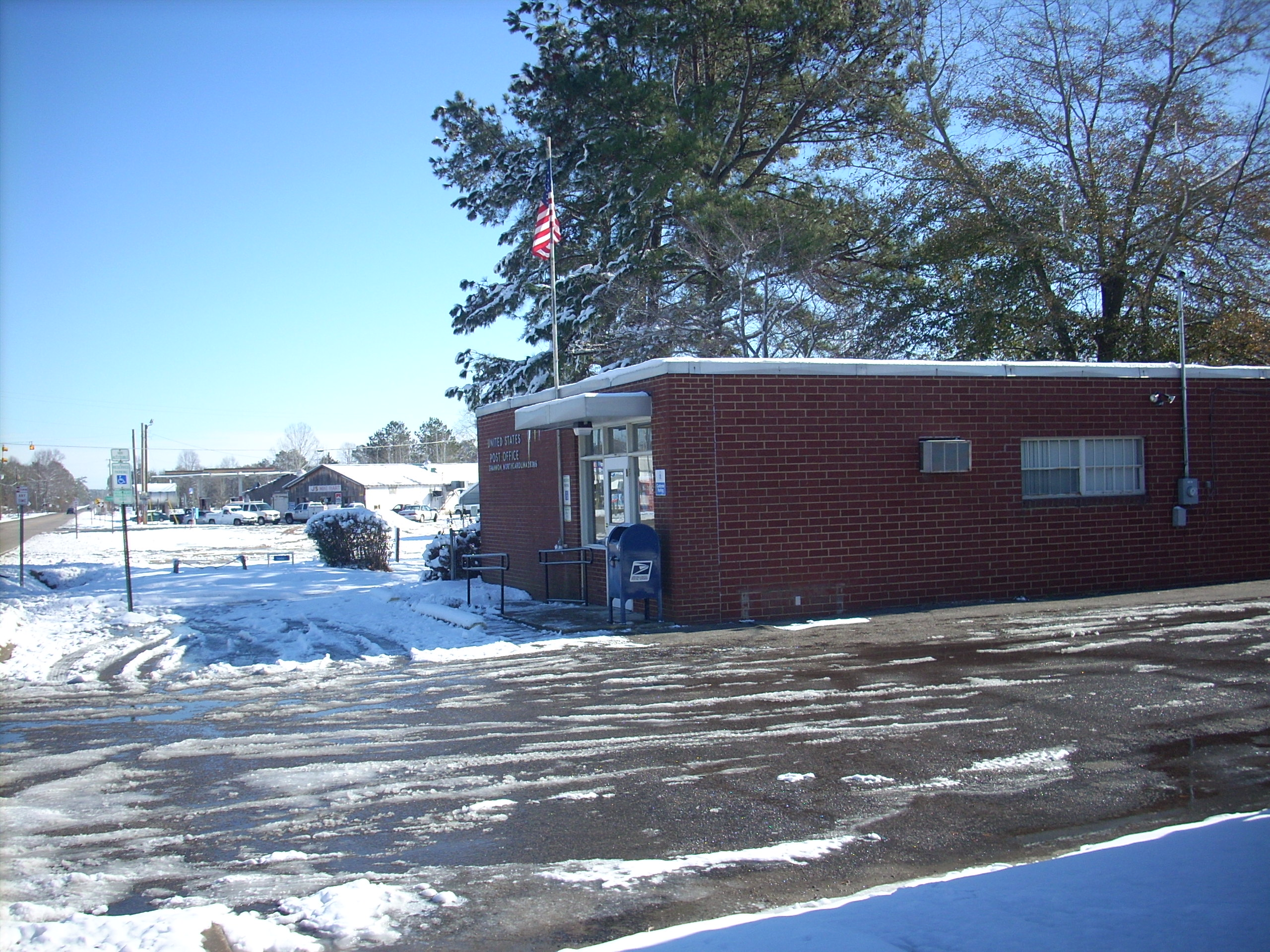
- The Shannon post office after a rare snowfall

- Location within the state of North Carolina
- Coordinates: 34°50′52″N 79°08′23″W
- Country: United States
- State: North Carolina
- County: Robeson

Area
  - Total: 1.02 sq mi (2.65 km^{2})
  - Land: 1.02 sq mi (2.65 km^{2})
  - Water: 0 sq mi (0.00 km^{2})
- Elevation: 203 ft (62 m)

Population (2020)
  - Total: 217
  - Density: 212.4/sq mi (82.02/km^{2})
- Time zone: UTC-5 (EST)
  - Summer (DST): UTC-4 (EDT)
- ZIP code: 28386
- Area codes: 910, 472
- FIPS code: 37-60940
- GNIS feature ID: 2402845

Shannon is a census-designated place (CDP) in Robeson County, North Carolina, United States. The population was 217 at the 2020 census.

== Geography ==
According to the United States Census Bureau, the CDP has a total area of 1.0 square mile (2.6 km^{2}), all land.

== Demographics ==
Historical population
Census	Pop.	Note	%±
2020	217		—
U.S. Decennial Census

As of the census of 2000, there were 197 people, 78 households, and 51 families residing in the CDP. The population density was 192.2 people per square mile (74.2 people/km^{2}). There were 86 housing units at an average density of 83.9 per square mile (32.4/km^{2}). The racial makeup of the CDP was 22.84% White, 30.46% African American, 29.95% Native American, 8.63% from other races, and 8.12% from two or more races. Hispanic or Latino of any race were 19.29% of the population.

There were 78 households, out of which 21.8% had children under the age of 18 living with them, 44.9% were married couples living together, 17.9% had a female householder with no husband present, and 34.6% were non-families. 29.5% of all households were made up of individuals, and 9.0% had someone living alone who was 65 years of age or older. The average household size was 2.53 and the average family size was 3.08.

In the CDP, the population was spread out, with 19.8% under the age of 18, 16.8% from 18 to 24, 25.4% from 25 to 44, 22.8% from 45 to 64, and 15.2% who were 65 years of age or older. The median age was 34 years. For every 100 females, there were 114.1 males. For every 100 females age 18 and over, there were 119.4 males.

The median income for a household in the CDP was $30,156, and the median income for a family was $48,194. Males had a median income of $38,333 versus $27,656 for females. The per capita income for the CDP was $13,321. About 30.9% of families and 44.1% of the population were below the poverty line, including 100.0% of those under the age of eighteen and none of those 65 or over.
