= Association for Biblical Higher Education =

Evangelical Christian organization of bible colleges

The Association for Biblical Higher Education
- Formation: 1947 (not-for-profit corporation in 1954)
- Headquarters: Orlando, FL
- Location(s): 5850 TG Lee Blvd, Suite 130; Orlando, FL 32822
- Members: 171
- President: Philip E. Dearborn
- Key people: William Blocker, DMCE, Board Chairman
- Staff: 12
- Website: abhe.org

The Association for Biblical Higher Education (ABHE), formerly The Accrediting Association of Bible Colleges (AABC) is an evangelical Christian organization of bible colleges in the United States, Canada and Puerto Rico. It is a member of the International Council for Evangelical Theological Education. The ABHE is interdenominational but requires annual affirmation of a common statement of beliefs. It is headquartered in Orlando, Florida.

== History ==
The organization was founded in 1947 as the Accrediting Association of Bible Institutes and Bible Colleges. The name was shortened in 1957 to the Accrediting Association of Bible Colleges. From 1973 to 1994 the organization was called the American Association of Bible Colleges, but the name Accrediting Association of Bible Colleges was restored in 1994. In 2004 the name of the organization changed to the Association for Biblical Higher Education "in order to reflect its expansion of scope with graduate education accreditation and programmatic accreditation."

== Statistics ==
The ABHE has 171 member institutions. Over 63,000+ students are reported to be enrolled in ABHE Member institutions.

== Affiliations ==
The ABHE is a member of the International Council for Evangelical Theological Education.

== Accreditation ==
The ABHE is incorporated in the State of Illinois as a not-for-profit corporation and exempt from income tax under section 501(c)(3) of the Internal Revenue Code. It is a recognized accrediting agency in the United States. It is recognized by the United States Department of Education and the Council for Higher Education Accreditation.

== Standards for accreditation ==
To achieve or retain accreditation from ABHE, a school must demonstrate that it is accomplishing its mission and goals through a comprehensive system of assessment and planning. It also requires that the school annually affirm its tenets of faith; the tenets also include a position statement that supports conservative Biblical views on sexuality with which the school must agree.

== Honor society ==
The ABHE sponsors the Delta Epsilon Chi honor society for students at its accredited institutions.

== See also ==
- List of recognized accreditation associations of higher learning
- Educational accreditation
