= Bible college =

College emphasizing religious instruction

A Bible college, sometimes referred to as a Bible institute or theological institute or theological seminary, is an evangelical Christian or Restoration Movement Christian institution of higher education which prepares students for Christian ministry with theological education, Biblical studies and practical ministry training.

Bible colleges primarily offer undergraduate degrees, but may also offer graduate degrees, lower-level associate degrees, certificates or diplomas in specialized areas of Christian training where a full degree is not required.

== History ==
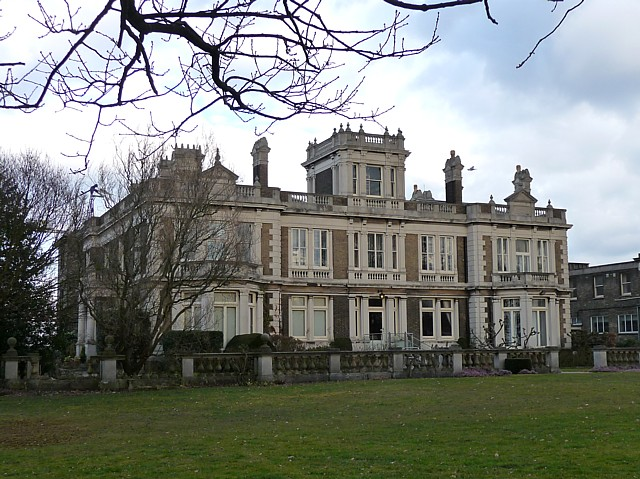
Spurgeon's College, London

Bible colleges differ from other theological institutions in their missionary perspective. In Europe, the first schools that could be classified in this category are St. Chrischona Theological Seminary founded in 1840 by Christian Friedrich Spittler in Bettingen, Switzerland, and the Pastors' College (affiliated with the Baptist Union of Great Britain) established in 1856 by Baptist Pastor Charles Spurgeon at London in the United Kingdom.

In the United States and Canada, the origins of the Bible college movement are in the late 19th-century Bible institute movement. The first Bible schools in North America were founded by Canadian Pastor A. B. Simpson (Nyack College in 1882) of the Christian and Missionary Alliance, and D. L. Moody (Moody Bible Institute in 1887). Many were established as a reaction against established theological colleges and seminaries, which conservatives believed were becoming increasingly liberal and undermining traditional Evangelical Christian teachings, such as Biblical inerrancy.

The American Bible college movement developed in reaction to the secularization of U.S. higher education. The "Bible institute/college movement" has been described as "a protest to the inroads of secularization in higher education and as a base for the education of lay workers and full-time Bible teachers, evangelists, and pastors". As one historian put it, "It is not a coincidence that the Bible institute movement grew up during the very period when the philosophy of naturalism became prevalent in American education". Between 1882 and 1920, 39 Bible schools were founded in the United States.

In 1995, a campus of the New Orleans Baptist Theological Seminary in the United States was established at the Louisiana State Penitentiary following an invitation from the prison warden, Burl Cain. The school has contributed to a significant reduction in the rate of violence in the prison. In 2016, Cain founded the Prison Seminaries Foundation, an organization that has various member seminaries in American prisons.

== Programs ==
Bible colleges generally confer bachelor's degrees, most often in biblical studies and various divisions of Christian ministry, pastoral ministry and worship ministry or church music. Some Bible colleges offer degree programs in ministry-related areas that also have secular application, such as Christian education.

Beyond the undergraduate level, some others have established seminaries and graduate divisions.

At some Bible colleges, associate's degrees, diplomas, or certificates are available. These programs are generally designed for laypersons (such as Sunday school teachers) who neither want nor need a bachelor's degree to perform their Christian service, but who desire additional training in such areas as Bible studies or the teachings and practices of their denomination. Many Bible colleges offer correspondence or online training.

Many Bible colleges in the United States and Canada that offer intercollegiate athletic programs are members of the National Christian College Athletic Association or the Association of Christian College Athletics.

== Accreditation ==
The International Council for Evangelical Theological Education was founded in 1980 by the Theological Commission of the World Evangelical Alliance. In 2015, it would have 1,000 member schools in 113 countries.

== Affiliations ==
Bible colleges are usually associated with evangelical, conservative, Christian fundamentalist denominations. (Note: The Canadian Encyclopedia lists the largest affiliated denominations as Mennonites, Pentecostals, Holiness movement churches, Baptists, Churches of Christ, Church of God, the Missionary Church, and the Christian and Missionary Alliance.) Their primary purpose is to prepare people for roles within Christian ministry. The Bible-centered curriculum is typically supplemented by structured programs of Christian service.

== Professor salary and teacher-student ratio ==
In the United States, the average salary for a full professor at a Bible institute was around $49,000 in 2012. The student-to-faculty ratio is around 13 students to one instructor.

== See also ==
- Association for Biblical Higher Education, formerly the Accrediting Association of Bible Colleges, an accreditation agency that accredits numerous bible colleges
- Christian school
- List of evangelical seminaries and theological colleges
- Transnational Association of Christian Colleges and Schools, another accrediting association that accredits numerous bible colleges
- Yeshiva
