= List of Theta Alpha Kappa chapters =

Theta Alpha Kappa is an American honor society for religious studies and theology. It was established in 1976 at Manhattan College in the Bronx, New York City, New York. In the following list, active chapters are indicated in bold and inactive chapters and institutions are in italics.

Number	Chapter	Charter date and range	Institution	Location	Status	Ref.
1	**Alpha**	1976	Manhattan University	Bronx, New York City, New York	Active	
2	**Beta**	1977	King's College	Wilkes-Barre, Pennsylvania	Active	
3	**Gamma**	1977	Caldwell University	Caldwell, New Jersey	Active	
4	**Delta**	1977	Saint Elizabeth University	Morristown, New Jersey	Active	
5	**Epsilon**	1977	Iona University	New Rochelle, New York	Active	
6	**Zeta**	1977	Fairfield University	Fairfield, Connecticut	Active	
7	**Eta**	1977	University of Mount Saint Vincent	Riverdale, New York	Active	
8	**Theta**	1977	Marquette University	Milwaukee, Wisconsin	Active	
9	**Iota**	1977	University of Portland	Portland, Oregon	Active	
10	**Kappa**	1977	Barry University	Miami Shores, Florida	Active	
11	**Lambda**	1977	University of Dayton	Dayton, Ohio	Active	
12	**Mu**	1977	James Madison University	Harrisonburg, Virginia	Active	
13	**Nu**	1977	University of San Francisco	San Francisco, California	Active	
14	**Xi**	1977	La Salle University	Philadelphia, Pennsylvania	Active	
15	Omicron	1977	Kenrick–Glennon Seminary	Shrewsbury, Missouri	Inactive	
16	**Pi**		St. Edward's University	Austin, Texas	Active	
17	**Rho**		DePaul University	Chicago, Illinois	Active	
18	**Sigma**		Georgian Court University	Lakewood Township, New Jersey	Active	
19	Tau					
20	**Upsilon**		Loyola University Chicago	Chicago, Illinois	Active	
21	Phi		College of New Rochelle	New Rochelle, New York	Inactive	
22	**Chi**		College of Saint Teresa	Winona, Minnesota	Active	
23	**Psi**		Shenandoah University	Winchester, Virginia	Active	
24	**Omega**		Villanova University	Villanova, Pennsylvania	Active	
25	**Alpha Alpha**		St. John's University	Jamaica, Queens, New York City, New York	Active	
26	**Alpha Beta**		Saint Francis de Sales Seminary	Milwaukee, Wisconsin	Active	
27	Alpha Gamma		Saint Francis College	Loretto, Pennsylvania	Inactive	
28	**Alpha Delta**		St. Catherine University	Saint Paul, Minnesota	Active	
29	**Alpha Epsilon**		Evangel University	Springfield, Missouri	Active	
30	**Alpha Zeta**		Saint Louis University	St. Louis, Missouri	Active	
31	**Alpha Eta**		John Carroll University	University Heights, Ohio	Active	
32	Alpha Theta	1979	North Carolina Wesleyan College	Rocky Mount, North Carolina	Inactive	
33	**Alpha Iota**		Saint Peter's University	Jersey City, New Jersey	Active	
34	Alpha Kappa		Carroll University	Waukesha, Wisconsin	Inactive	
35	**Alpha Lambda**		Barton College	Wilson, North Carolina	Active	
36	**Alpha Mu**		Molloy University	Rockville Centre, New York	Active	
37	**Alpha Nu**		University of Scranton	Scranton, Pennsylvania	Active	
38	**Alpha Xi**		Saint Joseph's University	Philadelphia, Pennsylvania	Active	
39	**Alpha Omicron**		Seton Hall University	South Orange, New Jersey	Active	
40	**Alpha Pi**		Cabrini University	Radnor Township, Pennsylvania	Active	
41	Alpha Rho		Seton Hill College	Greensburg, Pennsylvania	Inactive	
42	**Alpha Sigma**		Loyola Marymount University	Los Angeles, California	Active	
43	**Alpha Tau**		Elon University	Elon, North Carolina	Active	
44	**Alpha Upsilon**		Niagara University	Niagara University, New York	Active	
45	**Alpha Phi**	1981	Santa Clara University	Santa Clara, California	Active	
46	**Alpha Chi**		University of San Diego	San Diego, California	Active	
47	**Alpha Psi**		Marywood University	Scranton, Pennsylvania	Active	
48	**Alpha Omega**		Loyola University Maryland	Baltimore, Maryland	Active	
49	**Alpha Alpha Alpha**		Lewis University	Romeoville, Illinois	Active	
50	Alpha Alpha Beta		Canisius College	Buffalo, New York	Inactive	
51	**Alpha Alpha Gamma**		Mount St. Mary's University	Emmitsburg, Maryland	Active	
52	**Alpha Alpha Delta**		Duquesne University	Pittsburgh, Pennsylvania	Active	
53	**Alpha Alpha Epsilon**		Salve Regina University	Newport, Rhode Island	Active	
54	**Alpha Alpha Zeta**		Dominican University	River Forest, Illinois	Active	
55	**Alpha Alpha Eta**		Gonzaga University	Spokane, Washington	Active	
56	**Alpha Alpha Theta**		Lourdes University	Sylvania, Ohio	Active	
57	Alpha Alpha Iota		University of Notre Dame	Notre Dame, Indiana	Inactive	
58	**Alpha Alpha Kappa**		Loyola University New Orleans	New Orleans, Louisiana	Active	
59	Alpha Alpha Lambda		University of Richmond	Richmond, Virginia	Inactive	
60	**Alpha Alpha Mu**		Baylor University	Waco, Texas	Active	
61	**Alpha Alpha Nu**		Western Evangelical Seminary, George Fox University	Portland, Oregon	Active	
62	**Alpha Alpha Xi**		University of St. Thomas	St. Paul, Minnesota	Active	
63	**Alpha Alpha Omicron**		Emory University	Atlanta, Georgia	Active	
64	**Alpha Alpha Pi**		Houston Christian University	Houston, Texas	Active	
65	**Alpha Alpha Rho**		Andrews University	Berrien Springs, Michigan	Active	
66	**Alpha Alpha Sigma**	1988	University of Mobile	Mobile, Alabama	Active	
67	Alpha Alpha Tau		Mount Marty College	Yankton, South Dakota	Inactive	
68	Alpha Alpha Upsilon		DeSales University	Center Valley, Pennsylvania	Inactive	
69	**Alpha Alpha Phi**		Hampden–Sydney College	Hampden Sydney, Virginia	Active	
70	Alpha Alpha Chi		Atlantic Union College	South Lancaster, Massachusetts	Inactive	
71	**Alpha Alpha Psi**		Texas Christian University	Fort Worth, Texas	Active	
72	**Alpha Alpha Omega**		University of St. Thomas	Houston, Texas	Active	
73	**Theta Chi Beta**		Syracuse University	Syracuse, New York	Active	
74	**Alpha Beta Alpha**		Saint Mary's College of California	Moraga, California	Active	
75	Alpha Beta Beta		Wheeling University	Wheeling, West Virginia	Inactive	
76	**Alpha Beta Gamma**		Ohio Wesleyan University	Delaware, Ohio	Active	
77	**Alpha Beta Delta**		Saint Xavier University	Chicago, Illinois	Active	
78	Alpha Beta Epsilon		Calumet College of St. Joseph	Whiting, Indiana	Inactive	
79	**Alpha Beta Zeta**		University of the Cumberlands	Williamsburg, Kentucky	Active	
80	**Alpha Beta Eta**		Carson–Newman University	Jefferson City, Tennessee	Active	
81	**Alpha Beta Theta**		University of Colorado Boulder	Boulder, Colorado	Active	
82	**Alpha Beta Iota**		Morningside University	Sioux City, Iowa	Active	
83	**Alpha Beta Kappa**		Georgetown University	Washington, D.C.	Active	
84	**Alpha Beta Lambda**		Bluefield University	Bluefield, Virginia	Active	
85	Alpha Beta Mu		Holy Names University	Oakland, California	Inactive	(Note: The university closed in 2023.)
86	**Alpha Beta Nu**		George Washington University	Washington, D.C.	Active	
87	**Alpha Beta Xi**		Cedar Crest College	Allentown, Pennsylvania	Active	
88	**Alpha Beta Omicron**		Gardner–Webb University	Boiling Springs, North Carolina	Active	
89	**Alpha Beta Pi**		St. Thomas University	Miami Gardens, Florida	Active	
90	**Alpha Beta Rho**		Carthage College	Kenosha, Wisconsin	Active	
91	**Alpha Beta Sigma**		Arizona State University	Tempe, Arizona	Active	
92	**Alpha Beta Tau**		Nazareth University	Pittsford, New York	Active	
93	**Alpha Beta Upsilon**	1995	University of Miami	Coral Gables, Florida	Active	
94	**Alpha Beta Phi**		University of California, Santa Barbara	Santa Barbara, California	Active	
95	**Alpha Beta Chi**		Western Kentucky University	Bowling Green, Kentucky	Active	
96	**Alpha Beta Psi**		California State University, Chico	Chico, California	Active	
97	**Alpha Beta Omega**		Shorter University	Rome, Georgia	Active	
98	Alpha Gamma Alpha		Hastings College	Hastings, Nebraska	Inactive	
99	**Alpha Gamma Beta**		University of Wisconsin–Madison	Madison, Wisconsin	Active	
100	**Alpha Gamma Gamma**		Westminster College	Fulton, Missouri	Active	
101	Alpha Gamma Delta		Converse University	Spartanburg, South Carolina	Inactive	
102	Alpha Gamma Epsilon		Millikin University	Decatur, Illinois	Inactive	
103	**Alpha Gamma Zeta**		University of Alabama	Tuscaloosa, Alabama	Active	
104	**Alpha Gamma Eta**		Stonehill College	Easton, Massachusetts	Active	
105	Alpha Gamma Theta		Cardinal Stritch University	Milwaukee, Wisconsin	Inactive	
106	**Alpha Gamma Iota**		McDaniel College	Westminster, Maryland	Active	
107	**Alpha Gamma Kappa**		Wake Forest University	Winston-Salem, North Carolina	Active	
108	**Alpha Gamma Lambda**		Claremont Colleges	Claremont, California	Active	
109	**Alpha Gamma Mu**		Creighton University	Omaha, Nebraska	Active	
110	**Alpha Gamma Nu**		Randolph–Macon College	Ashland, Virginia	Active	
111	Alpha Gamma Xi		College of Saint Benedict and Saint John's University	St. Joseph, Minnesota	Inactive	
112	**Alpha Gamma Omicron**	1996	Stetson University	DeLand, Florida	Active	
113	**Alpha Gamma Pi**		Florida International University	Miami, Florida	Active	
114	**Alpha Gamma Rho**		Oklahoma City University	Oklahoma City, Oklahoma	Active	
115	**Alpha Gamma Sigma**		Grand View University	Des Moines, Iowa	Active	
116	**Alpha Gamma Tau**	1997	University of Georgia	Athens, Georgia	Active	
117	**Alpha Gamma Upsilon**		Saint Leo University	St. Leo, Florida	Active	
118	**Alpha Gamma Phi**		Wingate University	Wingate, North Carolina	Active	
119	**Alpha Gamma Chi**		Saint Mary's College	Notre Dame, Indiana	Active	
120	**Alpha Gamma Psi**		Virginia Wesleyan University	Virginia Beach, Virginia	Active	
121	**Alpha Gamma Omega**		Saint Mary's University of Minnesota	Winona, Minnesota	Active	
122	Alpha Delta Alpha		Auburn University	Auburn, Alabama	Inactive	
123	Alpha Delta Beta		Quincy University	Quincy, Illinois	Inactive	
124	**Alpha Delta Gamma**		Salem College	Winston-Salem, North Carolina	Active	
125	**Alpha Delta Delta**		St. Gregory's University	Shawnee, Oklahoma	Active	
126	**Alpha Delta Epsilon**	1998	Mercer University	Macon, Georgia	Active	
127	**Alpha Delta Zeta**		Elmhurst University	Elmhurst, Illinois	Active	
128	**Alpha Delta Eta**		Indiana University Bloomington	Bloomington, Indiana	Active	
129	Alpha Delta Theta		University of New Mexico	Albuquerque, New Mexico	Inactive	
130	**Alpha Delta Iota**		University of Pennsylvania	Philadelphia, Pennsylvania	Active	
131	**Alpha Delta Kappa**	February 1998	St. Olaf College	Northfield, Minnesota	Active	
132	**Alpha Delta Lambda**	1998	Washington University in St. Louis	St. Louis, Missouri	Active	
133	**Alpha Delta Mu**		Ripon College	Ripon, Wisconsin	Active	
134	**Alpha Delta Nu**		Le Moyne College	Syracuse, New York	Active	
135	**Alpha Delta Xi**		University of California, Riverside	Riverside, California	Active	
136	**Alpha Delta Omicron**		Williams Baptist University	Walnut Ridge, Arkansas	Active	
137	Alpha Delta Pi		Southern Adventist University	Collegedale Tennessee	Inactive	
138	Alpha Delta Rho		Southwestern Baptist Theological Seminary	Fort Worth, Texas	Inactive	
139	**Alpha Delta Sigma**		Belmont University	Nashville, Tennessee	Active	
140	**Alpha Delta Tau**		College of the Holy Cross	Worcester, Massachusetts	Active	
141	**Alpha Delta Upsilon**		Valparaiso University	Valparaiso, Indiana	Active	
142	**Alpha Delta Phi**		Palm Beach Atlantic University	West Palm Beach, Florida	Active	
143	**Alpha Delta Chi**		University of Missouri	Columbia, Missouri	Active	
144	**Alpha Delta Psi**		Agnes Scott College	Decatur, Georgia	Active	
145	**Alpha Delta Omega**		St. Norbert College	De Pere, Wisconsin	Active	
146	**Alpha Epsilon Alpha**		Claflin University	Orangeburg, South Carolina	Active	
147	**Alpha Epsilon Beta**		Ohio Northern University	Ada, Ohio	Active	
148	**Alpha Epsilon Gamma**		Carroll College	Helena, Montana	Active	
149	**Alpha Epsilon Delta**		Ouachita Baptist University	Arkadelphia, Arkansas	Active	
150	**Alpha Epsilon Epsilon**		Roanoke College	Salem, Virginia	Active	
151	**Alpha Epsilon Zeta**		Ohio Dominican University	Columbus, Ohio	Active	
152	**Alpha Epsilon Eta**		Immaculata University	Immaculata, Pennsylvania	Active	
153	**Alpha Epsilon Theta**		Wartburg College	Waverly, Iowa	Active	
154	**Alpha Epsilon Iota**	2000	Rhodes College	Memphis, Tennessee	Active	
155	**Alpha Epsilon Kappa**		Meredith College	Raleigh, North Carolina	Active	
156	**Alpha Epsilon Lambda**		Kentucky Christian University	Grayson, Kentucky	Active	
157	**Alpha Epsilon Mu**		Missouri State University	Springfield, Missouri	Active	
158	**Alpha Epsilon Nu**		Franklin College	Franklin, Indiana	Active	
159	**Alpha Epsilon Xi**		Catholic University of America	Washington, D.C.	Active	
160	**Alpha Epsilon Omicron**		St. Lawrence University	Canton, New York	Active	
161	**Alpha Epsilon Pi**		Siena Heights University	Adrian, Michigan	Active	
162	**Alpha Epsilon Rho**		Alma College	Alma, Michigan	Active	
163	**Alpha Epsilon Sigma**		Centenary College of Louisiana	Shreveport, Louisiana	Active	
164	Alpha Epsilon Tau		Youngstown State University	Youngstown, Ohio	Inactive	
165	**Alpha Epsilon Upsilon**		Lenoir–Rhyne University	Hickory, North Carolina	Active	
166	**Alpha Epsilon Phi**		Merrimack College	North Andover, Massachusetts	Active	
167	**Alpha Epsilon Chi**		Erskine College	Due West, South Carolina	Active	
168	**Alpha Epsilon Psi**		Dallas Baptist University	Dallas, Texas	Active	
169	**Alpha Epsilon Omega**		Boston College	Chestnut Hill, Massachusetts	Active	
170	**Alpha Zeta Alpha**		Mount Mary University	Milwaukee, Wisconsin	Active	
171	Alpha Zeta Beta		Louisiana State University	Baton Rouge, Louisiana	Inactive	
172	Alpha Zeta Gamma		Oklahoma Baptist University	Shawnee, Oklahoma	Inactive	
173	**Alpha Zeta Delta**		University of Southern California	Los Angeles, California	Active	
174	**Alpha Zeta Epsilon**		Notre Dame of Maryland University	Baltimore, Maryland	Active	
175	Alpha Zeta Zeta		University of Virginia	Charlottesville, Virginia	Inactive	
176	**Alpha Zeta Eta**		Thiel College	Greenville, Pennsylvania	Active	
177	**Alpha Zeta Theta**		Gustavus Adolphus College	St. Peter, Minnesota	Active	
178	Alpha Zeta Iota		University of Florida	Gainesville, Florida	Inactive	
179	**Alpha Zeta Kappa**		University of Texas at Austin	Austin, Texas	Active	
180	**Alpha Zeta Lambda**		University of Wisconsin–Eau Claire	Eau Claire, Wisconsin	Active	
181	**Alpha Zeta Mu**		Huntingdon College	Montgomery, Alabama	Active	
182	**Alpha Zeta Nu**	2003	Greensboro College	Greensboro, North Carolina	Active	
183	**Alpha Zeta Xi**		Alvernia University	Reading, Pennsylvania	Active	
184	**Alpha Zeta Omicron**		University of Northwestern – St. Paul	Roseville, Minnesota	Active	
185	**Alpha Zeta Pi**		John Brown University	Siloam Springs, Arkansas	Active	
186	**Alpha Zeta Rho**		Rosemont College	Rosemont, Pennsylvania	Active	
187	**Alpha Zeta Sigma**		Xavier University of Louisiana	New Orleans, Louisiana	Active	
188	**Alpha Zeta Tau**		Rockhurst University	Kansas City, Missouri	Active	
189	**Alpha Zeta Upsilon**		Sacred Heart University	Fairfield, Connecticut	Active	
190	**Alpha Zeta Phi**		Lyon College	Batesville, Arkansas	Active	
191	**Alpha Zeta Chi**		Muhlenberg College	Allentown, Pennsylvania	Active	
192	**Alpha Zeta Psi**		University of Mount Union	Alliance, Ohio	Active	
193	**Alpha Zeta Omega**		Culver–Stockton College	Canton, Missouri	Active	
194	**Alpha Eta Alpha**		University of Pikeville	Pikeville, Kentucky	Active	
195	**Alpha Eta Beta**		LaGrange College	LaGrange, Georgia	Active	
196	**Alpha Eta Gamma**		Our Lady of the Lake University	San Antonio, Texas	Active	
197	**Alpha Eta Delta**		La Sierra University	Riverside, California	Active	
198	**Alpha Eta Epsilon**		University of Rochester	Rochester, New York	Active	
199	**Alpha Eta Zeta**		Spelman College	Atlanta, Georgia	Active	
200	**Alpha Eta Eta**		Grove City College	Grove City, Pennsylvania	Active	
201	**Alpha Eta Theta**		Hillsdale College	Hillsdale, Michigan	Active	
202	**Alpha Eta Iota**		University of California, Los Angeles	Los Angeles, California	Active	
203	**Alpha Eta Kappa**	2004	East Texas Baptist University	Marshall, Texas	Active	
204	**Alpha Eta Lambda**		St. Joseph's University	Patchogue, New York	Active	
205	**Alpha Eta Mu**		William Jewell College	Liberty, Missouri	Active	
206	Alpha Eta Nu		Paul Quinn College	Dallas, Texas	Inactive	
207	**Alpha Eta Xi**		Whittier College	Whittier, California	Active	
208	**Alpha Eta Omicron**	2004	Judson University	Elgin, Illinois	Active	
209	**Alpha Eta Pi**		Miami University	Oxford, Ohio	Active	
210	**Alpha Eta Rho**		Lehigh University	Bethlehem, Pennsylvania	Active	
211	**Alpha Eta Sigma**		DePauw University	Greencastle, Indiana	Active	
212	**Alpha Eta Tau**		Illinois College	Jacksonville, Illinois	Active	
213	**Alpha Eta Upsilon**		University of Bridgeport	Bridgeport, Connecticut	Active	
214	Alpha Eta Phi		Mars Hill University	Mars Hill, North Carolina	Inactive	
215	**Alpha Eta Chi**		Benedict College	Columbia, South Carolina	Active	
216	**Alpha Eta Psi**		Concordia University Irvine	Irvine, California	Active	
217	**Alpha Eta Omega**		Principia College	Elsah, Illinois	Active	
218	Alpha Theta Alpha		University of Mary	Bismarck, North Dakota	Inactive	
219	**Alpha Theta Beta**		University of North Carolina at Pembroke	Pembroke, North Carolina	Active	
220	**Alpha Theta Gamma**		Lycoming College	Williamsport, Pennsylvania	Active	
221	**Alpha Theta Delta**		Anderson University	Anderson, South Carolina	Active	
222	**Alpha Theta Epsilon**		Christopher Newport University	Newport News, Virginia	Active	
223	**Alpha Theta Zeta**		Moravian College	Bethlehem, Pennsylvania	Active	
224	**Alpha Theta Eta**		Winthrop University	Rock Hill, South Carolina	Active	
225	**Alpha Theta Theta**		Spring Hill College	Mobile, Alabama	Active	
226	**Alpha Theta Iota**	2006	Central Methodist University	Fayette, Missouri	Active	
227	Alpha Theta Kappa		Hartwick College	Oneonta, New York	Inactive	
228	Alpha Theta Lambda		Texas Lutheran University	Seguin, Texas	Inactive	
229	**Alpha Theta Mu**		Campbell University	Buies Creek, North Carolina	Active	
230	**Alpha Theta Nu**		Chestnut Hill College	Philadelphia, Pennsylvania	Active	
231	Alpha Theta Xi		Boston University	Boston, Massachusetts	Inactive	
232	**Alpha Theta Omicron**		Fordham University	Bronx, New York City, New York	Active	
233	**Alpha Theta Pi**		Blue Mountain Christian University	Blue Mountain, Mississippi	Active	
234	**Alpha Theta Rho**		Hardin–Simmons University	Abilene, Texas	Active	
235	**Alpha Theta Sigma**		Central Washington University	Ellensburg, Washington	Active	
236	**Alpha Theta Tau**		University of North Dakota	Grand Forks, North Dakota	Active	
237	**Alpha Theta Upsilon**		Saint Michael's College	Colchester, Vermont	Active	
238	**Alpha Theta Phi**		Susquehanna University	Selinsgrove, Pennsylvania	Active	
239	**Alpha Theta Chi**		Garrett–Evangelical Theological Seminary	Evanston, Illinois	Active	
240	**Alpha Theta Psi**		Warner University	Lake Wales, Florida	Active	
241	**Alpha Theta Omega**		Randolph College	Lynchburg, Virginia	Active	
242	**Alpha Iota Alpha**		Saint Vincent College	Latrobe, Pennsylvania	Active	
243	**Alpha Iota Beta**	2008	High Point University	High Point, North Carolina	Active	
244	Alpha Iota Gamma		Florida Center for Theological Studies	Miami, Florida	Consolidated	(Note: Florida Center for Theological Studies divinity program merged into St. Thomas University's School of Theology and Ministry in 2010. The latter has the Alpha Beta Pi chapter of Theta Alpha Kappa.)
245	**Alpha Iota Delta**		University of Puget Sound	Tacoma, Washington	Active	
246	**Alpha Iota Epsilon**		Samford University	Homewood, Alabama	Active	
247	**Alpha Iota Zeta**		Southwestern Christian University	Bethany, Oklahoma	Active	
248	**Alpha Iota Eta**		Bucknell University	Lewisburg, Pennsylvania	Active	
249	**Alpha Iota Theta**		University of North Carolina at Greensboro	Greensboro, North Carolina	Active	
250	**Alpha Iota Iota**		Southwest Baptist University	Bolivar, Missouri	Active	
251	Alpha Iota Kappa		Rollins College	Winter Park, Florida	Inactive	
252	**Alpha Iota Lambda**		Truman State University	Kirksville, Missouri	Active	
253	**Alpha Iota Mu**		Providence College	Providence, Rhode Island	Active	
254	**Alpha Iota Nu**		Nelson University	Waxahachie, Texas	Active	(Note: Chapter formed at Southwestern Assemblies of God University, now Nelson University.)
255	**Alpha Iota Xi**		Campbellsville University	Campbellsville, Kentucky	Active	
256	**Alpha Iota Omicron**		Bethany College	Bethany, West Virginia	Active	
257	**Alpha Iota Pi**		California State University, Chico	Chico, California	Active	
258	**Alpha Iota Rho**		Lake Forest College	Lake Forest, Illinois	Active	
259	**Alpha Iota Sigma**		University of Redlands	Redlands, California	Active	
260	**Alpha Iota Tau**		University of Mississippi	University, Mississippi	Active	
261	Alpha Iota Upsilon					
262	**Alpha Iota Phi**		Emmanuel College	Boston, Massachusetts	Active	
263	Alpha Iota Chi		Columbia College	Columbia, South Carolina	Inactive	
264	**Alpha Iota Psi**		Millsaps College	Jackson, Mississippi	Active	
265	**Alpha Iota Omega**		Albright College	Reading, Pennsylvania	Active	
266	**Alpha Kappa Alpha**		Aquinas College	Grand Rapids, Michigan	Active	
267	**Alpha Kappa Beta**		Gettysburg College	Gettysburg, Pennsylvania	Active	
268	**Alpha Kappa Gamma**		Livingstone College	Salisbury, North Carolina	Active	
269	**Alpha Kappa Delta**		Ashland University	Ashland, Ohio	Active	
270	**Alpha Kappa Epsilon**		University of Lynchburg	Lynchburg, Virginia	Active	
271	**Alpha Kappa Zeta**		Benedictine University	Lisle, Illinois	Active	
272	**Alpha Kappa Eta**		Allegheny College	Meadville, Pennsylvania	Active	
273	**Alpha Kappa Theta**		Marian University	Fond du Lac, Wisconsin	Active	
274	**Alpha Kappa Iota**		Florida Southern College	Lakeland, Florida	Active	
275	**Alpha Kappa Kappa**		Felician University	Lodi, New Jersey	Active	
276	**Alpha Kappa Lambda**		Mercyhurst University	Erie, Pennsylvania	Active	
277	Alpha Kappa Mu		Davis & Elkins College	Elkins, West Virginia	Inactive	
278	**Alpha Kappa Nu**		Northwestern University	Evanston, Illinois	Active	
279	**Alpha Kappa Xi**		Bethune–Cookman University	Daytona Beach, Florida	Active	
280	**Alpha Kappa Omicron**	2011	New York University	New York City, New York	Active	
281	**Alpha Kappa Pi**		University of Evansville	Evansville, Indiana	Active	
282	**Alpha Kappa Rho**		California State University, Fullerton	Fullerton, California	Active	
283	**Alpha Kappa Sigma**		Abilene Christian University	Abilene, Texas	Active	
284	**Alpha Kappa Tau**		University of Texas at El Paso	El Paso, Texas	Active	
285	**Alpha Kappa Upsilon**		Augustana University	Sioux Falls, South Dakota	Active	
286	**Alpha Kappa Phi**		University of Iowa	Iowa City, Iowa	Active	
287	**Alpha Kappa Chi**		Texas Wesleyan University	Fort Worth, Texas	Active	
288	**Alpha Kappa Psi**		St. Mary's University, Texas	San Antonio, Texas	Active	
289	**Alpha Kappa Omega**		Messiah University	Grantham, Pennsylvania	Active	
290	Alpha Lambda Alpha		Lebanon Valley College	Annville Township, Pennsylvania	Inactive	
291	**Alpha Lambda Beta**		Florida Memorial University	Miami Gardens, Florida	Active	
292	**Alpha Lambda Gamma**		Valdosta State University	Valdosta, Georgia	Active	
	Alpha Lambda Delta				Unassigned	
293	**Alpha Lambda Kappa**		McMurry University	Abilene, Texas	Active	
294	**Alpha Lambda Epsilon**		Dickinson College	Carlisle, Pennsylvania	Active	
295	**Alpha Lambda Zeta**		University of Denver	Denver, Colorado	Active	
296	**Alpha Lambda Eta**		Chowan University	Murfreesboro, North Carolina	Active	
297	**Alpha Lambda Theta**		Georgetown College	Georgetown, Kentucky	Active	
298	**Alpha Lambda Iota**		University of North Carolina at Asheville	Asheville, North Carolina	Active	
299	**Alpha Lambda Lambda**		Chapman University	Orange, California	Active	
300	**Alpha Lambda Mu**		University of Hawaiʻi at Mānoa	Honolulu, Hawaii	Active	
301	**Alpha Lambda Nu**		Colorado College	Colorado Springs, Colorado	Active	
302	**Alpha Lambda Xi**		LeTourneau University	Longview, Texas	Active	
303	**Alpha Lambda Omicron**		Wayland Baptist University	Plainview, Texas	Active	
304	**Alpha Lambda Pi**		California State University, Northridge	Northridge, Los Angeles, California	Active	
305	**Alpha Lambda Rho**		Grand Valley State University	Allendale, Michigan	Active	
306	**Alpha Lambda Sigma**		Young Harris College	Young Harris, Georgia	Active	
307	**Alpha Lambda Tau**	February 2014	Ohio University	Athens, Ohio	Active	
308	**Alpha Lambda Upsilon**		Queens University of Charlotte	Charlotte, North Carolina	Active	
309	**Alpha Lambda Phi**		Wiley University	Marshall, Texas	Active	
310	**Alpha Lambda Chi**		Montclair State University	Montclair, New Jersey	Active	
311	**Alpha Lambda Psi**		Saint Anselm College	Manchester, New Hampshire	Active	
312	**Alpha Lambda Omega**		Morehouse College	Atlanta, Georgia	Active	
313	**Alpha Mu Alpha**		Mid-Atlantic Christian University	Elizabeth City, North Carolina	Active	
314	**Alpha Mu Beta**		College of the Ozarks	Point Lookout, Missouri	Active	
315	**Alpha Mu Gamma**		Bellarmine University	Louisville, Kentucky	Active	
316	**Alpha Mu Delta**		Pfeiffer University	Misenheimer, North Carolina	Active	
317	**Alpha Mu Epsilon**		Wheaton College	Wheaton, Illinois	Active	
318	**Alpha Mu Zeta**		Lawrence University	Appleton, Wisconsin	Active	
319	**Alpha Mu Eta**		Bethany College	Lindsborg, Kansas	Active	
320	**Alpha Mu Theta**		University of North Carolina at Charlotte	Charlotte, North Carolina	Active	
321	**Alpha Mu Iota**		Furman University	Greenville, South Carolina	Active	
322	**Alpha Mu Kappa**		Simpson College	Indianola, Iowa	Active	
323	**Alpha Mu Lambda**		Indiana Wesleyan University	Marion, Indiana	Active	
324	**Alpha Mu Mu**		Pacific Lutheran University	Tacoma, Washington	Active	
325	**Alpha Mu Nu**		Central College	Pella, Iowa	Active	
326	**Alpha Mu Xi**		University of Providence	Great Falls, Montana	Active	(Note: Chapter formed at the University of Great Falls, now the University of Providence.)
327	**Alpha Mu Omicron**		Radford University	Radford, Virginia	Active	
328	**Alpha Mu Pi**		Virginia Tech	Blacksburg, Virginia	Active	
329	**Alpha Mu Rho**		Lee University	Cleveland, Tennessee	Active	
330	**Alpha Mu Sigma**		Walsh University	North Canton, Ohio	Active	
331	**Alpha Mu Tau**		North Central University	Minneapolis, Minnesota	Active	
332	**Alpha Mu Upsilon**		Michigan State University	East Lansing, Michigan	Active	
333	**Alpha Mu Phi**		Mississippi College	Clinton, Mississippi	Active	
334	**Alpha Mu Chi**		Elizabethtown College	Elizabethtown, Pennsylvania	Active	
335	**Alpha Mu Psi**		Amridge University	Montgomery, Alabama	Active	
336	**Alpha Mu Omega**		Appalachian State University	Boone, North Carolina	Active	
337	**Alpha Nu Alpha**		Athens State University	Athens, Alabama	Active	
338	**Alpha Nu Betea**		Georgia State University	Atlanta, Georgia	Active	
339	**Alpha Nu Gamma**		McKendree University	Lebanon, Illinois	Active	
340	Alpha Nu Delta		South University, Warrensville Heights	Warrensville Heights, Ohio	Inactive	(Note: South University's Warrensville Heights campus is closed.)
341	**Alpha Nu Epsilon**		Hamilton College	Clifton, New York	Active	
342	**Alpha Nu Zeta**		University of Kansas	Lawrence, Kansas	Active	
343	**Alpha Nu Eta**		Capital University	Bexley, Ohio	Active	
344	**Alpha Nu Theta**		Averett University	Danville, Virginia	Active	
345	**Alpha Nu Iota**		Eastern University	St. Davids, Pennsylvania	Active	
346	**Alpha Nu Kappa**		University of North Carolina at Chapel Hill	Chapel Hill, North Carolina	Active	
347	**Alpha Nu Lambda**		Lindenwood University	St. Charles, Missouri	Active	
348	**Alpha Nu Mu**		Southwestern Adventist University	Keene, Texas	Active	
349	**Alpha Nu Nu**		St. Francis College	Brooklyn Heights, New York City, New York	Active	
350	**Alpha Nu Xi**		Cedarville University	Cedarville, Ohio	Active	
351	**Alpha Nu Omicron**	October 2019	Florida State University	Tallahassee, Florida	Active	
352	**Alpha Nu Pi**		Unification Theological Seminary	New York City, New York	Active	
353	**Alpha Nu Rho**		Fresno Pacific University	Fresno, California	Active	
354	**Alpha Nu Sigma**		Johnson University	Kimberlin Heights, Tennessee	Active	
355	**Alpha Nu Tau**		Freed–Hardeman University	Henderson, Tennessee	Active	
356	**Alpha Nu Upsilon**		Mount St. Joseph University	Delhi Township, Ohio	Active	
357	**Alpha Nu Phi**		Our Lady of the Elms College	Chicopee, Massachusetts	Active	
358	**Alpha Nu Chi**		University of Chicago	Chicago, Illinois	Active	
359	**Alpha Nu Psi**		Holy Apostles College and Seminary	Cromwell, Connecticut	Active	
360	**Alpha Nu Omega**		Criswell College	Dallas, Texas	Active	
361	**Alpha Xi Alpha**		Tabor College	Hillsboro, Kansas	Active	
362	Alpha Xi Beta		Birmingham–Southern College	Birmingham, Alabama	Inactive	(Note: The college closed in 2024.)
363	**Alpha Xi Gamma**		Kenyon College	Gambier, Ohio	Active	
364	**Alpha Xi Delta**		Leavell College	New Orleans, Louisiana	Active	
365	**Alpha Xi Epsilon**		Saint Joseph's College of Maine	Standish, Maine	Active	
366	**Alpha Xi Zeta**		Butler University	Indianapolis, Indiana	Active	
367	**Alpha Xi Eta**		Arkansas Baptist College	Little Rock, Arkansas	Active	
368	**Alpha Xi Theta**		McPherson College	McPherson, Kansas	Active	
369	**Alpha Xi Iota**		University of Houston	Houston, Texas	Active	
