= List of Chi Alpha Sigma chapters =

Chi Alpha Sigma is an American honor society for college student-athletes who excel in the classroom and athletic competitions. It formed at DePauw University in 1996. In the following list of chapters, active chapters are indicated in bold and inactive chapters and institutions are in italics.

| Chapter | Charter date and range | Institution | Location | Status | Ref. |
|---|---|---|---|---|---|
| **Indiana Alpha** | May 17, 1996 | DePauw University | Greencastle, Indiana | Active | |
| **Illinois Sigma** | May 17, 1996 – xxxx ?; May 31, 2016 | Millikin University | Decatur, Illinois | Active | |
| **New Jersey Xi** | January 1, 1997 – 20xx ?; March 4, 2014 | William Paterson University | Wayne, New Jersey | Active | |
| **New York Alpha** | January 1, 1997 – xxxx ?; January 26, 2024 | State University of New York at Oneonta | Oneonta, New York | Active | |
| **Ohio Alpha** | March 19, 1997 – xxxx ?; September 30, 2017 | Wittenberg University | Springfield, Ohio | Active | |
| **Ohio Rho** | March 19, 1997 – xxxx ?; September 30, 2017 | Kenyon College | Gambier, Ohio | Active | |
| Ohio Beta | March 22, 1997 | Case Western Reserve University | Cleveland, Ohio | Inactive | |
| Ohio Gamma | March 26, 1997 | Otterbein University | Westerville, Ohio | Inactive | |
| **Ohio Delta** | April 1, 1997 | Ohio State University | Columbus, Ohio | Active | |
| **Ohio Epsilon** | April 1, 1997 – xxxx ?; September 30, 2017 | John Carroll University | University Heights, Ohio | Active | |
| **Ohio Psi** | April 1, 1997 – xxxx ?; February 7, 2019 | University of Akron | Akron, Ohio | Active | |
| **Illinois Alpha Eta** | April 25, 1997 – xxxx ?; February 4, 2025 | Wheaton College | Wheaton, Illinois | Active | |
| **Indiana Beta** | April 25, 1997 | Franklin College | Franklin, Indiana | Active | |
| **Indiana Gamma** | April 26, 1997 | Grace College & Seminary | Winona Lake, Indiana | Active | |
| **Illinois Phi** | April 26, 1997 – xxxx ?; October 30, 2018 | Governors State University | University Park, Illinois | Active | |
| **Illinois Alpha Beta** | January 2, 1998 – xxxx ?; September 25, 2024 | Northern Illinois University | DeKalb, Illinois | Active | |
| Indiana Delta | January 2, 1998 | Purdue University Northwest | Hammond and Westville, Indiana | Inactive | |
| Indiana Epsilon | February 16, 1998 | Valparaiso University | Valparaiso, Indiana | Inactive | |
| Illinois Alpha | March 16, 1998 | Quincy University | Quincy, Illinois | Inactive | |
| Kentucky Alpha | March 16, 1998 | Bellarmine University | Louisville, Kentucky | Inactive | |
| Illinois Beta | March 19, 1998 | Dominican University | River Forest, Illinois | Inactive | |
| **Illinois Alpha Gamma** | April 2, 1998 – xxxx ?; September 25, 2024 | Monmouth College | Monmouth, Illinois | Active | |
| **Indiana Zeta** | April 2, 1998 | Huntington University | Huntington, Indiana | Active | |
| **Illinois Gamma** | April 3, 1998 – xxxx ?; February 4, 2025 | Lake Forest College | Lake Forest, Illinois | Active | |
| **Iowa Kappa** | April 3, 1998 – xxxx ?; August 15, 2024 | Coe College | Cedar Rapids, Iowa | Active | |
| **Illinois Delta** | April 5, 1998 | University of Illinois Urbana-Champaign | Champaign, Illinois | Active | |
| **Iowa Epsilon** | April 5, 1998 – xxxx ?; March 24, 2023 | Mount Mercy University | Cedar Rapids, Iowa | Active | |
| Rhode Island Alpha | April 6, 1998 | University of Rhode Island | Kingston, Rhode Island | Active | |
| Illinois Epsilon | April 16, 1998 | Trinity Christian College | Palos Heights, Illinois | Inactive | |
| **Ohio Zeta** | April 16, 1998 | Kent State University | Kent, Ohio | Active | |
| **Ohio Eta** | April 16, 1998 | Mount St. Joseph University | Cincinnati, Ohio | Active | |
| Illinois Zeta | April 19, 1998 | University of St. Francis | Joliet, Illinois | Inactive | |
| **Illinois Eta** | April 23, 1998 – xxxx ?; February 5, 2025 | Knox College | Galesburg, Illinois | Active | |
| **Iowa Lambda** | April 23, 1998 – xxxx ?; August 15, 2024 | Simpson College | Indianola, Iowa | Active | |
| Illinois Theta | May 1, 1998 | University of Chicago | Chicago, Illinois | Inactive | |
| **Illinois Alpha Delta** | May 11, 1998 – xxxx ?; December 12, 2024 | Northwestern University | Evanston, Illinois | Active | |
| **Indiana Eta** | May 11, 1998 | Rose–Hulman Institute of Technology | Terre Haute, Indiana | Active | |
| Indiana Theta | October 13, 1998 | Marian University | Indianapolis, Indiana | Inactive | |
| Ohio Theta | October 30, 1998 | Wilmington College | Wilmington, Ohio | Inactive | |
| **Illinois Mu** | February 4, 1999 – xxxx ?; March 12, 2008 | North Central College | Naperville, Illinois | Active | |
| **Indiana Iota** | February 4, 1999 | Purdue University | West Lafayette, Indiana | Active | |
| **Delaware Alpha** | March 2, 1999 | Delaware State University | Dover, Delaware | Active | |
| **Indiana Kappa** | March 10, 1999 | Indiana University Bloomington | Bloomington, Indiana | Active | |
| **Illinois Omega** | March 10, 1999 – xxxx ?; September 7, 2022 | Illinois Wesleyan University | Bloomington, Illinois | Active | |
| Indiana Lambda | March 30, 1999 | Ball State University | Muncie, Indiana | Inactive | |
| Indiana Mu | April 9, 1999 | Indiana University–Purdue University Indianapolis | Indianapolis, Indiana | Inactive | (Note: In 2024, IUPUI split into Indiana University Indianapolis and Purdue University in Indianapolis.) |
| Georgia Alpha | September 3, 1999 | Oglethorpe University | Brookhaven, Georgia | Inactive | |
| Texas Alpha | September 7, 1999 | University of Houston | Houston, Texas | Inactive | |
| Pennsylvania Alpha | September 26, 1999 | University of Pittsburgh | Pittsburgh, Pennsylvania | Inactive | |
| **Florida Alpha** | October 3, 1999 | Florida State University | Tallahassee, Florida | Active | |
| Illinois Iota | March 7, 2000 | Southern Illinois University Edwardsville | Edwardsville, Illinois | Inactive | |
| Indiana Nu | March 7, 2000 | Manchester University | North Manchester, Indiana | Inactive | |
| **Alabama Alpha** | March 8, 2000 | University of Alabama at Birmingham | Birmingham, Alabama | Active | |
| **Mississippi Alpha** | March 13, 2000 | University of Southern Mississippi | Hattiesburg, Mississippi | Active | |
| **New Jersey Alpha** | March 13, 2000 – 200x ?; February 26, 2003 | Fairleigh Dickinson University | Madison, New Jersey | Active | |
| **New York Beta** | March 13, 2000 – 20xx ?; July 30, 2013 | University at Buffalo | Buffalo, New York | Active | |
| Indiana Xi | March 17, 2000 | Taylor University | Upland, Indiana | Inactive | |
| Georgia Beta | April 7, 2000 | Kennesaw State University | Cobb County, Georgia | Inactive | |
| Louisiana Alpha | April 7, 2000 | Louisiana State University | Baton Rouge, Louisiana | Inactive | |
| Indiana Omicron | April 10, 2000 | University of Evansville | Evansville, Indiana | Inactive | |
| **Florida Beta** | April 19, 2000 | University of Florida | Gainesville, Florida | Active | |
| **Georgia Gamma** | August 25, 2000 | Piedmont University | Demorest, Georgia | Active | |
| **Mississippi Beta** | September 13, 2000 | Jackson State University | Jackson, Mississippi | Active | |
| **South Carolina Alpha** | September 14, 2000 – 20xx ?; January 1, 2015 | Francis Marion University | Florence, South Carolina | Active | |
| **South Carolina Beta** | September 14, 2000 – 200x ?; September 7, 2004 | Anderson University | Anderson, South Carolina | Active | |
| **Hawaii Alpha** | September 26, 2000 | Hawaii Pacific University | Honolulu, Hawaii | Active | |
| **Oregon Alpha** | October 10, 2000 | University of Oregon | Eugene, Oregon | Active | |
| Texas Beta | October 21, 2000 | Southwestern University | Georgetown, Texas | Inactive | |
| **New Jersey Mu** | February 19, 2001 – 20xx ?; February 26, 2013 | Rutgers University–Camden | Camden, New Jersey | Active | |
| **New York Gamma** | February 19, 2001 – 20xx ?; August 7, 2023 | State University of New York at Plattsburgh | Plattsburgh, New York | Active | |
| **New Hampshire Alpha** | October 29, 2001 – 20xx ?; May 2, 2023 | Saint Anselm College | Goffstown, New Hampshire | Active | |
| **North Carolina Pi** | October 29, 2001 – 20xx ?; October 26, 2021 | University of North Carolina Wilmington | Wilmington, North Carolina | Active | |
| **Wisconsin Alpha** | November 21, 2001 – 20xx ?; February 14, 2019 | University of Wisconsin–Madison | Madison, Wisconsin | Active | |
| **Wisconsin Epsilon** | November 21, 2001 – 20xx ?; October 6, 2016 | University of Wisconsin–River Falls | River Falls, Wisconsin | Active | |
| **Missouri Alpha** | January 29, 2002 | Westminster College | Fulton, Missouri | Active | |
| North Carolina Alpha | March 10, 2002 | Elon University | Elon, North Carolina | Inactive | |
| **New York Alpha Beta** | March 12, 2003 – 20xx ?; November 19, 2015 | University of Mount Saint Vincent | Riverdale, Bronx, New York | Active | |
| **New Jersey Gamma** | March 22, 2002 – 200x ?; February 5, 2004 | Monmouth University | West Long Branch, New Jersey | Active | |
| **New York Delta** | March 22, 2002 – 200x ?; September 26, 2006 | Canisius College | Buffalo, New York | Active | |
| Pennsylvania Beta | April 2, 2002 | Grove City College | Grove City, Pennsylvania | Inactive | |
| **North Carolina Beta** | February 26, 2003 | Lees–McRae College | Banner Elk, North Carolina | Active | |
| **Illinois Alpha Zeta** | March 25, 2003 – 20xx ?; February 4, 2025 | North Park University | Chicago, Illinois | Active | |
| **Indiana Pi** | March 25, 2003 – 20xx ?; September 30, 2017 | Trine University | Angola, Indiana | Active | |
| **New Jersey Rho** | April 1, 2003 – 20xx ?; November 20, 2020 | Saint Elizabeth University | Morris Township, New Jersey | Active | |
| **New York Epsilon** | April 1, 2003 – 20xx ?; 2014 – 20xx ?; October 16, 2024 | State University of New York at New Paltz | New Paltz, New York | Active | |
| Kentucky Beta | April 3, 2003 | Eastern Kentucky University | Richmond, Kentucky | Inactive | |
| Michigan Alpha | April 14, 2003 | Northern Michigan University | Marquette, Michigan | Inactive | |
| **Illinois Psi** | April 18, 2003 – 20xx ?; November 20, 2020 | Elmhurst University | Elmhurst, Illinois | Active | |
| **Indiana Rho** | April 18, 2003 | Purdue University Fort Wayne | Fort Wayne, Indiana | Active | |
| Massachusetts Alpha | September 11, 2003 | Northeastern University | Boston, Massachusetts | Inactive | |
| California Alpha | September 17, 2003 | University of the Pacific | Stockton, California | Inactive | |
| North Carolina Gamma | September 24, 2003 | Pfeiffer University | Misenheimer, North Carolina | Inactive | |
| **New Hampshire Beta** | September 26, 2003 – 20xx ?; October 30, 2024 | New England College | Henniker, New Hampshire | Active | |
| **North Carolina Sigma** | September 26, 2003 – 20xx ?; January 24, 2023 | University of North Carolina at Greensboro | Greensboro, North Carolina | Active | |
| Alabama Beta | October 8, 2003 | Samford University | Homewood, Alabama | Inactive | |
| **Missouri Beta** | October 9, 2003 | Webster University | Webster Groves, Missouri | Active | |
| **New Hampshire Kappa** | October 22, 2003 – 20xx ?; June 26, 2024 | Colby–Sawyer College | New London, New Hampshire | Active | |
| Michigan Beta | November 6, 2003 | Eastern Michigan University | Ypsilanti, Michigan | Inactive | |
| **New Jersey Beta** | November 11, 2003 – 200x ?; October 22, 2010 | Montclair State University | Montclair, New Jersey | Active | |
| **North Dakota Delta** | November 11, 2003 – 202x ?; October 21, 2024 | Valley City State University | Valley City, North Dakota | Active | |
| Tennessee Alpha | November 11, 2003 | Rhodes College | Memphis, Tennessee | Active | |
| Kentucky Gamma | November 14, 2003 | Centre College | Danville, Kentucky | Inactive | |
| **Maryland Alpha** | December 15, 2003 – 20xx ?; February 10, 2025 | University of Maryland, Baltimore County | Baltimore County, Maryland | Active | |
| **Massachusetts Upsilon** | December 15, 2003 – 20xx ?; February 10, 2015 | Westfield State University | Westfield, Massachusetts | Active | |
| **Ohio Kappa** | January 2, 2004 – 200x ?; February 2, 2007 | Baldwin Wallace University | Berea, Ohio | Active | |
| **Ohio Upsilon** | January 2, 2004 – 20xx ?; September 30, 2017 | College of Wooster | Wooster, Ohio | Active | |
| **North Carolina Kappa** | February 5, 2004 – 20xx ?; July 30, 2015 | Fayetteville State University | Fayetteville, North Carolina | Active | |
| **Oregon Beta** | February 15, 2004 – 20xx ?; August 1, 2011 | Eastern Oregon University | La Grande, Oregon | Active | |
| **Oregon Epsilon** | February 15, 2004 – 20xx ?; April 15, 2019 | Willamette University | Salem, Oregon | Active | |
| **New Jersey Delta** | February 20, 2004 – 200x ?; August 22, 2005 | Rutgers University–New Brunswick | Piscataway, New Jersey | Active | |
| **North Carolina Nu** | February 20, 2004 – 20xx ?; November 1, 2016 | Shaw University | Raleigh, North Carolina | Active | |
| **Illinois Kappa** | February 24, 2004 – 20xx ?; September 25, 2024 | Bradley University | Peoria, Illinois | Active | |
| **Iowa Beta** | February 24, 2004 – 20xx ?; February 11, 2017 | Luther College | Decorah, Iowa | Active | |
| Ohio Iota | February 26, 2004 | Capital University | Bexley, Ohio | Inactive | |
| **New York Zeta** | March 7, 2004 – 2010; 2020 | Long Island University | Brookville, New York | Active | |
| **New York Eta** | March 7, 2004 – 200x ?; March 7, 2006 | State University of New York Maritime College | New York City, New York | Active | |
| **Alabama Gamma** | March 10, 2004 | Auburn University | Auburn, Alabama | Active | |
| **New York Theta** | April 1, 2004 – 20xx ?; July 30, 2015 | Hilbert College | Hamburg, New York | Active | |
| **Pennsylvania Eta** | April 1, 2004 | University of Pittsburgh at Bradford | Bradford, Pennsylvania | Active | |
| **Pennsylvania Theta** | April 1, 2004 | University of Pittsburgh at Greensburg | Greensburg, Pennsylvania | Active | |
| **New York Tau** | April 1, 2004 – 20xx ?; March 1, 2011 | D'Youville University | Buffalo, New York | Active | |
| **Pennsylvania Delta** | April 1, 2004 | Mount Aloysius College | Cresson, Pennsylvania | Active | |
| **Pennsylvania Epsilon** | April 1, 2004 | Penn State Erie, The Behrend College | Erie, Pennsylvania | Active | |
| Louisiana Beta | April 4, 2004 | University of Louisiana at Lafayette | Lafayette, Louisiana | Inactive | |
| **Maryland Beta** | April 5, 2004 – 20xx ?; November 3, 2023 | St. Mary's College of Maryland | St. Mary's City, Maryland | Active | |
| **Massachusetts Alpha Beta** | April 5, 2004 – 20xx ?; November 2, 2023 | Simmons University | Boston, Massachusetts | Active | |
| Maryland Gamma | June 1, 2004 | Frostburg State University | Frostburg, Maryland | Inactive | |
| New York Iota | June 1, 2004 – 2023 | Medaille College | Buffalo, New York | Inactive | (Note: Medaille closed on August 31, 2023.) |
| **Pennsylvania Zeta** | June 1, 2004 | Penn State Altoona | Logan Township, Pennsylvania | Active | |
| **New Jersey Epsilon** | August 23, 2004 – 200x ?; January 12, 2006 | Seton Hall University | South Orange, New Jersey | Active | |
| **North Carolina Tau** | August 23, 2004 – 20xx ?; February 3, 2023 | Elizabeth City State University | Elizabeth City, North Carolina | Active | |
| **South Carolina Kappa** | September 7, 2004 – 20xx ?; January 29, 2019 | The Citadel | Charleston, South Carolina | Active | |
| **Florida Gamma** | October 1, 2004 | Palm Beach Atlantic University | West Palm Beach, Florida | Active | |
| **Pennsylvania Gamma** | October 5, 2004 | La Roche University | McCandless, Pennsylvania | Active | |
| California Beta | November 12, 2004 | California State University, Bakersfield | Bakersfield, California | Inactive | |
| **Pennsylvania Iota** | February 1, 2005 – 200x ?; September 15, 2010 | Saint Vincent College | Latrobe, Pennsylvania | Active | |
| California Gamma | February 10, 2005 | University of California, San Diego | San Diego, California | Inactive | |
| **Tennessee Beta** | February 19, 2005 – 20xx ?; October 31, 2022 | Middle Tennessee State University | Murfreesboro, Tennessee | Active | |
| **New Jersey Tau** | February 22, 2005 – 20xx ?; October 30, 2024 | Drew University | Madison, New Jersey | Active | |
| **New York Kappa** | February 22, 2005 – 20xx ?; October 29, 2024 | SUNY Brockport | Brockport, New York | Active | |
| **Oklahoma Alpha** | March 2, 2005 | Oklahoma City University | Oklahoma City, Oklahoma | Active | |
| **Massachusetts Alpha Alpha** | March 16, 2005 – 20xx ?; April 8, 2021 | Lasell University | Auburndale, Massachusetts | Active | |
| Texas Gamma | April 17, 2005 | Stephen F. Austin State University | Nacogdoches, Texas | Inactive | |
| **Massachusetts Xi** | June 30, 2005 – 20xx ?; February 15, 2013 | Wentworth Institute of Technology | Boston, Massachusetts | Active | |
| **New Jersey Zeta** | August 12, 2005 – 20xx ?; March 1, 2011 | Ramapo College | Mahwah, New Jersey | Active | |
| **North Dakota Epsilon** | August 12, 2005 – 202x ?; October 21, 2024 | Dickinson State University | Dickinson, North Dakota | Active | |
| **New York Lambda** | August 22, 2005 – 20xx ?; September 11, 2018 | St. John's University | New York City, New York | Active | |
| **California Delta** | September 26, 2005 | Loyola Marymount University | Los Angeles, California | Active | |
| **Connecticut Alpha** | October 2, 2005 | Mitchell College | New London, Connecticut | Active | |
| **Maine Alpha** | October 5, 2005 – 200x ?; April 17, 2007 | University of New England | Biddeford, Maine | Active | |
| **Massachusetts Theta** | October 5, 2005 – 200x ?; September 28, 2008 | University of Massachusetts Amherst | Amherst, Massachusetts | Active | |
| Texas Delta | October 16, 2005 | Texas A&M University | College Station, Texas | Inactive | |
| **California Epsilon** | December 13, 2005 | Chapman University | Orange, California | Active | |
| **New Hampshire Gamma** | January 4, 2006 – 20xx ?; January 23, 2014 | Franklin Pierce University | Rindge, New Hampshire | Active | |
| **North Carolina Mu** | January 4, 2006 – 20xx ?; April 18, 2016 | University of North Carolina at Chapel Hill | Chapel Hill, North Carolina | Active | |
| **New York Mu** | January 12, 2006 – 20xx ?; March 27, 2020 | Binghamton University | Binghamton, New York | Active | |
| **Kentucky Delta** | February 1, 2006 | Transylvania University | Lexington, Kentucky | Active | |
| **Minnesota Alpha** | February 9, 2006 | University of Minnesota Morris | Morris, Minnesota | Active | |
| Maine Beta | February 15, 2006 | University of Southern Maine | Portland, Gorham, and Lewiston, Maine | Inactive | |
| Kentucky Epsilon | February 16, 2006 | Northern Kentucky University | Highland Heights, Kentucky | Inactive | |
| West Virginia Alpha | February 16, 2006 | West Virginia University | Morgantown, West Virginia | Inactive | |
| Louisiana Gamma | March 7, 2006 | Southern University | Baton Rouge, Louisiana | Inactive | |
| **North Dakota Gamma** | March 8, 2006 – 202x ?; July 16, 2018 | Minot State University | Minot, North Dakota | Active | |
| **North Carolina Delta** | March 14, 2006 – 20xx ?; February 4, 2020 | North Carolina State University | Raleigh, North Carolina | Active | |
| Georgia Delta | March 20, 2006 | Savannah State University | Savannah, Georgia | Inactive | |
| **Kentucky Zeta** | March 20, 2006 | University of Louisville | Louisville, Kentucky | Active | |
| **Maryland Zeta** | March 23, 2006 – 200x ?; August 15, 2008 | Salisbury University | Salisbury, Maryland | Active | |
| **Massachusetts Beta** | March 23, 2006 – 200x ?; August 15, 2008 | Western New England University | Springfield, Massachusetts | Active | |
| **New Jersey Eta** | March 27, 2006 | Kean University | Union Township, New Jersey | Active | |
| **New York Nu** | March 27, 2006 – 20xx ?; March 7, 2022 | St. Thomas Aquinas College | Sparkill, New York | Active | |
| **Illinois Lambda** | April 25, 2006 – 20xx ?; February 4, 2025 | Rockford University | Rockford, Illinois | Active | |
| New York Xi | June 30, 2006 | Pace University | New York City, New York | Inactive | |
| Arkansas Alpha | August 31, 2006 | Arkansas State University | Jonesboro, Arkansas | Inactive | |
| **Florida Delta** | September 10, 2006 | Florida International University | Westchester, Florida | Active | |
| Kentucky Eta | September 18, 2006 | Western Kentucky University | Bowling Green, Kentucky | Inactive | |
| Louisiana Delta | September 21, 2006 | University of New Orleans | New Orleans, Louisiana | Inactive | |
| **New York Omicron** | September 26, 2006 – 20xx ?; October 26, 2021 | Ithaca College | Ithaca, New York | Active | |
| New York Pi | October 13, 2006 – 20xx ? | Iona College | New Rochelle, New York | Inactive | |
| Pennsylvania Kappa | October 13, 2006 | Lock Haven University of Pennsylvania | Lock Haven, Pennsylvania | Inactive | |
| Louisiana Epsilon | October 16, 2006 | University of Louisiana at Monroe | Monroe, Louisiana | Inactive | |
| Alabama Delta | October 20, 2006 | Troy University | Troy, Alabama | Inactive | |
| Florida Epsilon | November 6, 2006 | Florida Atlantic University | Boca Raton, Florida | Inactive | |
| **Iowa Alpha** | February 1, 2007 – 20xx ?; December 4, 2013 | Iowa State University | Ames, Iowa | Active | |
| **Texas Epsilon** | February 1, 2007 – 20xx ?; February 8, 2016 | University of Texas at Tyler | Tyler, Texas | Active | |
| **Texas Tau** | February 1, 2007 – 20xx ?; August 18, 2023 | Texas Southern University | Houston, Texas | Active | |
| **Ohio Lambda** | February 2, 2007 – 200x ?; August 7, 2023 | Lake Erie College | Painesville, Ohio | Active | |
| North Carolina Epsilon | February 5, 2007 | Campbell University | Buies Creek, North Carolina | Inactive | |
| Virginia Beta | February 19, 2007 | University of Richmond | Richmond, Virginia | Inactive | |
| Massachusetts Gamma | March 18, 2007 | Emmanuel College | Boston, Massachusetts | Inactive | |
| Texas Zeta | March 27, 2007 | Texas A&M International University | Laredo, Texas | Inactive | |
| New Hampshire Delta | April 1, 2007 – 20xx ? | Daniel Webster College | Nashua, New Hampshire | Inactive | (Note: Daniel Webster College closed in 2017.) |
| **New Hampshire Epsilon** | April 1, 2007 – 20xx ?; January 29, 2020 | Rivier University | Nashua, New Hampshire | Active | |
| **North Carolina Zeta** | April 1, 2007 | Belmont Abbey College | Belmont, North Carolina | Active | |
| Massachusetts Delta | April 15, 2007 | Emerson College | Boston, Massachusetts | Inactive | |
| **Massachusetts Epsilon** | April 17, 2007 – 20xx ?; December 12, 2024 | Suffolk University | Boston, Massachusetts | Active | |
| Massachusetts Zeta | April 23, 2007 | Pine Manor College | Chestnut Hill, Massachusetts | Inactive | (Note: The college became Messina College, an undergraduate constituent college of Boston College, in 2020.) |
| Massachusetts Eta | April 27, 2007 | Boston College | Boston, Massachusetts | Inactive | |
| **Virginia Gamma** | September 3, 2007 | Virginia Wesleyan University | Virginia Beach, Virginia | Active | |
| South Carolina Delta | September 9, 2007 | Coastal Carolina University | Conway, South Carolina | Inactive | |
| **Georgia Epsilon** | September 11, 2007 | Georgia Tech | Atlanta, Georgia | Active | |
| **Virginia Delta** | September 16, 2007 | Hampton University | Hampton, Virginia | Active | |
| **Virginia Epsilon** | October 1, 2007 | Randolph College | Lynchburg, Virginia | Active | |
| **Connecticut Beta** | November 2, 2007 | University of New Haven | West Haven, Connecticut | Active | |
| **Iowa Nu** | March 12, 2008 – 20xx ?; December 12, 2024 | University of Iowa | Iowa City, Iowa | Active | |
| **Pennsylvania Lambda** | April 8, 2008 – 20xx ?; May 4, 2016 | Cedar Crest College | Allentown, Pennsylvania | Active | |
| **Pennsylvania Alpha Nu** | April 9, 2008 – 20xx ?; August 29, 2019 | Lancaster Bible College | Lancaster, Pennsylvania | Active | |
| Michigan Gamma | April 21, 2008 | Central Michigan University | Mount Pleasant, Michigan | Inactive | |
| **New Jersey Theta** | June 3, 2008 – 20xx ?; July 7, 2022 | Rowan University | Glassboro, New Jersey | Active | |
| **North Dakota Zeta** | June 3, 2008 – 202x ?; October 21, 2024 | Mayville State University | Mayville, North Dakota | Active | |
| **Pennsylvania Mu** | July 23, 2008 – 20xx ?; October 16, 2020 | Neumann University | Aston, Pennsylvania | Active | |
| **New York Alpha Lambda** | October 2, 2008 – 20xx ?; February 19, 2019 | State University of New York at Morrisville | Morrisville, New York | Active | |
| Vermont Alpha | August 28, 2008 | Norwich University | Northfield, Vermont | Inactive | |
| **North Carolina Psi** | September 20, 2008 – 202x ?; January 7, 2025 | Greensboro College | Greensboro, North Carolina | Active | |
| Washington Alpha | September 21, 2008 | Eastern Washington University | Cheney, Washington | Inactive | |
| **New Jersey Iota** | September 20, 2008 – 20xx ?; November 15, 2018 | Georgian Court University | Lakewood Township, New Jersey | Active | |
| **Massachusetts Alpha Delta** | September 28, 2008 – 20xx ?; November 22, 2024 | Curry College | Milton, Massachusetts | Active | |
| **Kansas Alpha** | October 1, 2008 | Central Christian College of Kansas | McPherson, Kansas | Active | |
| **Pennsylvania Nu** | January 1, 2009 – 20xx ?; October 10, 2019 | Seton Hill University | Greensburg, Pennsylvania | Active | |
| **Pennsylvania Pi** | January 1, 2009 | Mercyhurst University | Erie, Pennsylvania | Active | |
| **Pennsylvania Alpha Sigma** | January 1, 2009 – 20xx ?; September 22, 2020 | Lafayette College | Easton, Pennsylvania | Active | |
| **Pennsylvania Alpha Tau** | January 20, 2009 – 20xx ?; April 2021 | Temple University | Philadelphia, Pennsylvania | Active | |
| Ohio Mu | January 22, 2009 | Franciscan University of Steubenville | Steubenville, Ohio | Inactive | |
| **Maine Gamma** | January 23, 2009 – 20xx ?; April 4, 2023 | Saint Joseph's College of Maine | Standish, Maine | Active | |
| **Massachusetts Iota** | January 23, 2009 – 20xx ?; November 1, 2024 | Nichols College | Dudley, Massachusetts | Active | |
| **Michigan Delta** | January 28, 2009 | Saginaw Valley State University | University Center, Michigan | Active | |
| Pennsylvania Omicron | January 29, 2009 | University of Pittsburgh at Johnstown | Johnstown, Pennsylvania | Inactive | |
| Massachusetts Kappa | January 31, 2009 | Eastern Nazarene College | Quincy, Massachusetts | Inactive | |
| **Kansas Beta** | February 11, 2009 | Newman University | Wichita, Kansas | Active | |
| **Alabama Epsilon** | March 1, 2009 | University of Montevallo | Montevallo, Alabama | Active | |
| **Wisconsin Zeta** | March 1, 2009 – 20xx ?; January 23, 2023 | Lawrence University | Appleton, Wisconsin | Active | |
| **Wisconsin Beta** | March 1, 2009 – 20xx ?; April 16, 2019 | Carthage College | Kenosha, Wisconsin | Active | |
| South Carolina Epsilon | March 17, 2009 | Coker College | Hartsville, South Carolina | Inactive | |
| **Oklahoma Beta** | March 30, 2009 | Oklahoma Panhandle State University | Goodwell, Oklahoma | Active | |
| Rhode Island Beta | April 8, 2009 | Bryant University | Smithfield, Rhode Island | Inactive | |
| Virginia Zeta | April 9, 2010 | College of William & Mary | Williamsburg, Virginia | Inactive | |
| **New Jersey Nu** | April 16, 2009 – 20xx ?; January 23, 2014 | Centenary University | Hackettstown, New Jersey | Active | |
| **New York Rho** | April 16, 2009 – 20xx ?; February 28, 2024 | State University of New York at Cortland | Cortland, New York | Active | |
| Georgia Zeta | April 30, 2009 | Georgia Southwestern State University | Americus, Georgia | Inactive | |
| Tennessee Gamma | May 19, 2009 | East Tennessee State University | Johnson City, Tennessee | Inactive | |
| Massachusetts Lamba | July 1, 2009 | Lesley University | Cambridge, Massachusetts | Inactive | |
| Ohio Nu | July 30, 2009 | Miami University | Oxford, Ohio | Inactive | |
| **Kansas Gamma** | August 7, 2009 | Emporia State University | Emporia, Kansas | Active | |
| Texas Eta | September 18, 2009 | Texas A&M University–Corpus Christi | Corpus Christi, Texas | Inactive | |
| **California Zeta** | November 7, 2009 | Dominican University of California | San Rafael, California | Active | |
| **Florida Zeta** | November 18, 2009 | Saint Leo University | St. Leo, Florida | Active | |
| **Pennsylvania Xi** | January 11, 2010 | PennWest California | California, Pennsylvania | Active | |
| **Alabama Zeta** | January 29, 2010 | Faulkner University | Montgomery, Alabama | Active | |
| **Delaware Beta** | February 10, 2010 | Wilmington University | Wilmington, Delaware | Active | |
| **West Virginia Beta** | March 18, 2010 – 20xx ?; February 4, 2025 | University of Charleston | Charleston, West Virginia | Active | |
| **Wisconsin Gamma** | March 18, 2010 | Marquette University | Milwaukee, Wisconsin | Active | |
| Massachusetts Mu | April 27, 2010 | Regis College | Weston, Massachusetts | Inactive | |
| Louisiana Zeta | May 5, 2010 | Xavier University of Louisiana | New Orleans, Louisiana | Inactive | |
| California Eta | May 6, 2010 | California State University, Long Beach | Long Beach, California | Inactive | |
| **Pennsylvania Rho** | June 25, 2010 – 201x ?; August 22, 2018 | Point Park University | Pittsburgh, Pennsylvania | Active | |
| **Pennsylvania Sigma** | June 25, 2010 – 20xx ?; July 9, 2021 | Marywood University | Scranton, Pennsylvania | Active | |
| **Pennsylvania Alpha Alpha** | June 25, 2010 – 201x ?; May 4, 2016 | Gwynedd Mercy University | Lower Gwynedd Township, Pennsylvania | Active | |
| **Pennsylvania Tau** | September 15, 2010 – 201x ?; June 29, 2018 | Thiel College | Greenville, Pennsylvania | Active | |
| New Jersey Kappa | September 27, 2010 | Richard Stockton College of New Jersey | Galloway Township, New Jersey | Inactive | |
| **New York Sigma** | October 22, 2010 – 20xx ?; September 16, 2022 | Dominican University New York | Orangeburg, New York | Active | |
| California Theta | November 1, 2010 – 2023 | Holy Names University | Oakland, California | Inactive | (Note: Holy Names University closed in 2023) |
| **Alabama Eta** | November 1, 2010 | University of West Alabama | Livingston, Alabama | Active | |
| **Ohio Xi** | November 1, 2010 | Bowling Green State University | Bowling Green, Ohio | Active | |
| **Wisconsin Eta** | December 2, 2010 – 20xx ?; August 15, 2024 | Ripon College | Ripon, Wisconsin | Active | |
| **Rhode Island Gamma** | December 2, 2010 – 201x ?; September 9, 2019 | Providence College | Providence, Rhode Island | Active | |
| Massachusetts Nu | December 9, 2010 | Becker College | Worcester, Massachusetts | Inactive | |
| **Vermont Beta** | March 1, 2011 | Saint Michael's College | Colchester, Vermont | Active | |
| **Washington Beta** | March 1, 2011 – 201x ?; March 3, 2015 | Gonzaga University | Spokane, Washington | Active | |
| **Rhode Island Delta** | March 3, 2011 – 20xx ?; November 25, 2024 | Salve Regina University | Newport, Rhode Island | Active | |
| **Rhode Island Epsilon** | March 3, 2011 – 201x ?; September 9, 2019 | Johnson & Wales University | Providence, Rhode Island | Active | |
| **Georgia Eta** | March 15, 2011 | Albany State University | Albany, Georgia | Active | |
| **Michigan Epsilon** | May 6, 2011 | Kalamazoo College | Kalamazoo, Michigan | Active | |
| **Minnesota Epsilon** | May 6, 2011 – 20xx ?; November 9, 2021 | St. Olaf College | Northfield, Minnesota | Active | |
| **Florida Eta** | July 24, 2011 | University of West Florida | Pensacola, Florida | Active | |
| **Oregon Gamma** | August 1, 2011 – 201x ?; March 19, 2019 | Bushnell University | Eugene, Oregon | Active | |
| Pennsylvania Upsilon | August 30, 2011 | Cheyney University of Pennsylvania | Cheyney, Pennsylvania | Inactive | |
| **Rhode Island Delta** | October 10, 2011 – 20xx ?; November 25, 2024 | Roger Williams University | Bristol, Rhode Island | Active | |
| **South Carolina Zeta** | October 10, 2011 – 201x ?; January 29, 2019 | South Carolina State University | Orangeburg, South Carolina | Active | |
| North Dakota Alpha | November 14, 2011 | University of Mary | Bismarck, North Dakota | Inactive | |
| Arkansas Beta | November 30, 2011 | University of Arkansas at Pine Bluff | Pine Bluff, Arkansas | Inactive | |
| **Illinois Alpha Theta** | December 12, 2011 – 20xx ?; February 5, 2025 | Roosevelt University | Chicago, Illinois | Active | |
| **Indiana Sigma** | December 12, 2011 | Indiana Institute of Technology | Fort Wayne, Indiana | Active | |
| **Virginia Eta** | December 12, 2011 | Norfolk State University | Norfolk, Virginia | Active | |
| South Carolina Eta | January 7, 2012 | University of South Carolina Upstate | Valley Falls, South Carolina | Inactive | |
| California Iota | January 30, 2012 | California Baptist University | Riverside, California | Inactive | |
| **Missouri Gamma** | January 30, 2012 | Rockhurst University | Kansas City, Missouri | Active | |
| **Delaware Gamma** | February 15, 2012 | University of Delaware | Newark, Delaware | Active | |
| **Tennessee Delta** | February 28, 2012 – 20xx ?; May 5, 2020 | King University | Bristol, Tennessee | Active | |
| **Tennessee Theta** | February 28, 2012 – 201x ?; April 5, 2017 | Lee University | Cleveland, Tennessee | Active | |
| **New Jersey Lambda** | March 9, 2012 – 20xx ?; August 16, 2022 | New Jersey Institute of Technology | Newark, New Jersey | Active | |
| **North Carolina Rho** | March 9, 2012 – 20xx ?; March 23, 2022 | Meredith College | Raleigh, North Carolina | Active | |
| **Michigan Zeta** | March 20, 2012 | Albion College | Albion, Michigan | Active | |
| **Maryland Eta** | April 8, 2012 – 201x ?; January 27, 2016 | Coppin State University | Baltimore, Maryland | Active | |
| **Massachusetts Phi** | April 8, 2012 – 201x ?; January 27, 2016 | Massachusetts College of Liberal Arts | North Adams, Massachusetts | Active | |
| New York Upsilon | May 8, 2012 | New York Institute of Technology | Old Westbury, New York | Inactive | |
| **Kentucky Theta** | July 24, 2012 | Murray State University | Murray, Kentucky | Active | |
| New Hampshire Zeta | July 24, 2012 | Plymouth State University | Plymouth, New Hampshire | Inactive | |
| Texas Theta | July 24, 2012 | Dallas Baptist University | Dallas, Texas | Inactive | |
| **Texas Alpha Beta** | July 24, 2012 | Midwestern State University | Wichita Falls, Texas | Active | |
| **New Hampshire Eta** | August 16, 2012 – 201x ?; February 26, 2013 | University of New Hampshire | Durham, New Hampshire | Active | |
| **North Carolina Xi** | August 16, 2012 – 20xx ?; February 6, 2020 | University of North Carolina at Asheville | Asheville, North Carolina | Active | |
| **Arkansas Gamma** | October 2, 2012 | University of Arkansas–Fort Smith | Fort Smith, Arkansas | Active | |
| **Montana Alpha** | October 2, 2012 | Montana State University Billings | Billings, Montana | Active | |
| **Illinois Nu** | October 11, 2012 – 201x ?; October 30, 2018 | Eastern Illinois University | Charleston, Illinois | Active | |
| **Iowa Gamma** | October 11, 2012 – 201x ?; March 1, 2018 | Loras College | Dubuque, Iowa | Active | |
| **Louisiana Eta** | October 11, 2012 | Centenary College of Louisiana | Shreveport, Louisiana | Active | |
| Mississippi Gamma | January 28, 2013 | University of Mississippi | Oxford, Mississippi | Inactive | |
| **Louisiana Theta** | February 15, 2013 | Southeastern Louisiana University | Hammond, Louisiana | Active | |
| **Arkansas Delta** | February 25, 2013 | University of Central Arkansas | Conway, Arkansas | Active | |
| **New York Alpha Pi** | February 26, 2013 – 20xx ?; March 27, 2020 | Mount Saint Mary College | Newburgh, New York | Active | |
| **North Carolina Eta** | February 26, 2013 – 201x ?; March 19, 2017 | Lenoir–Rhyne University | Hickory, North Carolina | Active | |
| **Virginia Theta** | March 7, 2013 | Christopher Newport University | Newport News, Virginia | Active | |
| **Massachusetts Omicron** | April 11, 2013 – 201x ?; October 19, 2016 | Bay Path University | Longmeadow, Massachusetts | Active | |
| **Massachusetts Alpha Zeta** | April 11, 2013 – 20xx ?; November 22, 2024 | Gordon College | Wenham, Massachusetts | Active | |
| **Tennessee Epsilon** | July 9, 2013 – 201x ?; April 5, 2017 | Christian Brothers University | Memphis, Tennessee | Active | |
| **Tennessee Eta** | July 9, 2013 – 201x ?; October 4, 2016 | Lincoln Memorial University | Harrogate, Tennessee | Active | |
| **Massachusetts Pi** | July 26, 2013 – 20xx ?; September 11, 2024 | Bridgewater State University | Bridgewater, Massachusetts | Active | |
| **Massachusetts Alpha Eta** | July 26, 2013 – 20xx ?; January 7, 2025 | Stonehill College | Easton, Massachusetts | Active | |
| North Carolina Theta | July 26, 2013 | Appalachian State University | Boone, North Carolina | Inactive | |
| **Illinois Xi** | July 30, 2013 – 201x ?; May 31, 2016 | Blackburn College | Carlinville, Illinois | Active | |
| **Iowa Eta** | July 30, 2013 – 20xx ?; August 15, 2024 | University of Dubuque | Dubuque, Iowa | Active | |
| **New York Phi** | July 30, 2013 – 201x ?; April 18, 2016 | Alfred University | Alfred, New York | Active | |
| **Maryland Nu** | August 12, 2013 – 201x ?; August 15, 2017 | Morgan State University | Baltimore, Maryland | Active | |
| **Massachusetts Rho** | August 12, 2013 – 201x ?; August 15, 2017 | Salem State University | Salem, Massachusetts | Active | |
| Maryland Theta | October 10, 2013 | Towson University | Towson, Maryland | Inactive | |
| **Massachusetts Sigma** | October 31, 2013 – 201x ?; December 4, 2014 | Fitchburg State University | Fitchburg, Massachusetts | Active | |
| **Virginia Iota** | November 1, 2013 | Hollins University | Hollins, Virginia | Active | |
| **District of Columbia Alpha** | December 4, 2013 | Gallaudet University | Washington, D.C. | Active | |
| **Illinois Omicron** | December 4, 2013 – 20xx ?; September 7, 2022 | Western Illinois University | Macomb, Illinois | Active | |
| North Carolina Iota | December 12, 2013 | Duke University | Durham, North Carolina | Inactive | |
| **Arkansas Epsilon** | January 13, 2014 | Arkansas Tech University | Russellville, Arkansas | Active | |
| **Maryland Xi** | January 13, 2014 – 201x ?; March 12, 2020 | Bowie State University | Prince George's County, Maryland | Active | |
| **Massachusetts Tau** | January 13, 2014 – 201x ?; March 12, 2020 | Worcester State University | Worcester, Massachusetts | Active | |
| **New Jersey Sigma** | February 12, 2014 – 20xx ?; May 2, 2023 | Rutgers University–Newark | Newark, New Jersey | Active | |
| **New York Chi** | February 12, 2014 – 20xx ?; October 15, 2024 | State University of New York at Fredonia | Fredonia, New York | Active | |
| **New Hampshire Iota** | March 4, 2014 – 201x ?; February 4, 2020 | Southern New Hampshire University | Manchester and Hooksett, New Hampshire | Active | |
| **New York Psi** | March 7, 2014 – 20xx ?; February 6, 2020 | St. Lawrence University | Canton, New York | Active | |
| **New York Alpha Xi** | March 7, 2014 – 201x ?; January 29, 2020 | United States Military Academy | West Point, New York | Active | |
| **Wisconsin Delta** | April 1, 2014 – 20xx ?; December 6, 2022 | University of Wisconsin–Green Bay | Green Bay, Wisconsin | Active | |
| **Wisconsin Theta** | April 1, 2014 | Beloit College | Beloit, Wisconsin | Active | |
| California Kappa | April 7, 2014 | California State University, Fresno | Fresno, California | Inactive | |
| New York Omega | April 7, 2014 | Union College | Schenectady, New York | Inactive | |
| Oregon Delta | April 15, 2014 | Western Oregon University | Monmouth, Oregon | Inactive | |
| **New Jersey Omicron** | May 22, 2014 – 201x ?; February 3, 2016 | Felician University | Rutherford, New Jersey | Active | |
| **North Carolina Chi** | May 22, 2014 – 202x ?; December 20, 2024 | Gardner–Webb University | Boiling Springs, North Carolina | Active | |
| Illinois Pi | September 2, 2014 – May 2020 | MacMurray College | Jacksonville, Illinois | Inactive | (Note: The college closed in May 2020.) |
| **Maryland Iota** | December 4, 2014 | Loyola University Maryland | Baltimore, Maryland | Active | |
| **Maryland Kappa** | December 5, 2014 – 201x ?; July 30, 2019 | Notre Dame of Maryland University | Baltimore, Maryland | Active | |
| **Massachusetts Chi** | December 5, 2014 – 201x ?; July 30, 2019 | Elms College | Chicopee, Massachusetts | Active | |
| **South Carolina Theta** | January 1, 2015 – 20xx ?; January 25, 2023 | Claflin University | Orangeburg, South Carolina | Active | |
| Mississippi Delta | January 8, 2015 | Alcorn State University | Lorman, Mississippi | Inactive | |
| **Virginia Kappa** | January 13, 2015 | University of Lynchburg | Lynchburg, Virginia | Active | |
| **New Jersey Pi** | February 20, 2015 – 20xx ?; November 8, 2022 | Bloomfield College | Bloomfield, New Jersey | Active | |
| **North Carolina Phi** | February 20, 2015 – 202x ?; September 5, 2024 | Warren Wilson College | Swannanoa, North Carolina | Active | |
| Ohio Omicron | February 20, 2015 | Defiance College | Defiance, Ohio | Inactive | |
| West Virginia Gamma | February 27, 2015 | Davis & Elkins College | Elkins, West Virginia | Inactive | |
| Illinois Rho | February 28, 2015 | Concordia University Chicago | River Forest, Illinois | Inactive | |
| Illinois Upsilon | February 28, 2015 | Chicago State University | Chicago, Illinois | Inactive | |
| **Washington Gamma** | March 3, 2015 – 20xx ?; July 9, 2024 | Pacific Lutheran University | Parkland, Washington | Active | |
| Mississippi Epsilon | March 7, 2015 | Mississippi Valley State University | Mississippi Valley State, Mississippi | Inactive | |
| New York Alpha Alpha | April 16, 2015 | Buffalo State College | Buffalo, New York | Inactive | |
| **Tennessee Xi** | April 17, 2015 – 20xx ?; October 18, 2024 | Union University | Jackson, Tennessee | Active | |
| **Texas Iota** | April 17, 2015 – 20xx ?; April 16, 2020 | Houston Christian University | Houston, Texas | Active | |
| Mississippi Zeta | May 15, 2015 | Millsaps College | Jackson, Mississippi | Inactive | |
| California Lambda | July 30, 2015 | San Diego Christian College | Santee, California | Inactive | |
| **Florida Theta** | July 30, 2015 | Florida Gulf Coast University | Fort Myers, Florida | Active | |
| Ohio Pi | July 30, 2015 – c. 2020 | Urbana University | Urbana, Ohio | Inactive | (Note: Urbana University closed in 2020.) |
| Pennsylvania Phi | July 30, 2015 | Saint Francis University | Loretto, Pennsylvania | Inactive | |
| **Virginia Lambda** | July 30, 2015 | Averett University | Danville, Virginia | Active | |
| **Washington Epsilon** | July 30, 2015 – 20xx ?; December 12, 2024 | Seattle University | Seattle, Washington | Active | |
| **West Virginia Delta** | July 30, 2015 – 20xx ?; August 15, 2024 | Glenville State University | Glenville, West Virginia | Active | |
| Texas Kappa | September 21, 2015 | Abilene Christian University | Abilene, Texas | Inactive | |
| Tennessee Zeta | October 1, 2015 | University of Tennessee at Martin | Martin, Tennessee | Inactive | |
| **Pennsylvania Chi** | October 13, 2015 – 201x ?; December 12, 2024 | Rosemont College | Rosemont, Pennsylvania | Active | |
| **Pennsylvania Psi** | October 13, 2015 – 201x ?; December 12, 2022 | Holy Family University | Philadelphia, Pennsylvania | Active | |
| **Pennsylvania Alpha Epsilon** | October 13, 2015 – 201x ?; January 31, 2017 | Chestnut Hill College | Philadelphia, Pennsylvania | Active | |
| South Carolina Iota | October 28, 2015 | Columbia College | Columbia, South Carolina | Inactive | |
| **Delaware Delta** | November 13, 2015 | Goldey–Beacom College | Pike Creek Valley, Delaware | Active | |
| **Indiana Tau** | November 19, 2015 | Indiana University Southeast | New Albany, Indiana | Active | |
| **New York Beta Alpha** | November 19, 2015 – 20xx ?; January 26, 2024 | Marist University | Poughkeepsie, New York | Active | |
| **Missouri Delta** | December 11, 2015 – 20xx ?; December 16, 2021 | Missouri Southern State University | Joplin, Missouri | Active | |
| Connecticut Gamma | January 27, 2016 | Albertus Magnus College | New Haven, Connecticut | Inactive | |
| **Michigan Eta** | January 29, 2016 | Alma College | Alma, Michigan | Active | |
| **New York Alpha Gamma** | February 3, 2016 – 201x ?; April 3, 2019 | Molloy University | Rockville Centre, New York | Active | |
| **Connecticut Delta** | February 6, 2016 | University of Saint Joseph | West Hartford, Connecticut | Active | |
| **Pennsylvania Omega** | February 8, 2016 | Gannon University | Erie, Pennsylvania | Active | |
| **Texas Lambda** | February 8, 2016 – 20xx ?; February 1, 2022 | Concordia University Texas | Austin, Texas | Active | |
| **Virginia Mu** | February 18, 2016 | University of Mary Washington | Fredericksburg, Virginia | Active | |
| **North Carolina Lambda** | March 18, 2016 – 20xx ?; June 26, 2024 | Chowan University | Murfreesboro, North Carolina | Active | |
| **New York Alpha Mu** | March 18, 2016 – 201x ?; March 6, 2019 | Hunter College | Manhattan, New York | Active | |
| Texas Mu | March 20, 2016 | Prairie View A&M University | Prairie View, Texas | Inactive | |
| **Connecticut Epsilon** | March 23, 2016 | Eastern Connecticut State University | Willimantic, Connecticut | Active | |
| **Iowa Theta** | April 25, 2016 – 20xx ?; August 15, 2024 | Central College | Pella, Iowa | Active | |
| **Florida Iota** | May 4, 2016 | Florida Southern College | Lakeland, Florida | Active | |
| **Connecticut Zeta** | May 25, 2016 | Post University | Waterbury, Connecticut | Active | |
| Missouri Epsilon | June 7, 2016 | Truman State University | Kirksville, Missouri | Inactive | |
| Maryland Lambda | June 21, 2016 | Mount St. Mary's University | Emmitsburg, Maryland | Inactive | |
| Missouri Zeta | July 3, 2016 | Southwest Baptist University | Bolivar, Missouri | Inactive | |
| **Florida Kappa** | July 19, 2016 | Nova Southeastern University | Fort Lauderdale-Davie, Florida | Active | |
| **Kansas Delta** | August 16, 2016 | Pittsburg State University | Pittsburg, Kansas | Active | |
| **Missouri Eta** | September 20, 2016 | Lincoln University | Jefferson City, Missouri | Active | |
| **Kentucky Iota** | October 3, 2016 | Kentucky Wesleyan College | Owensboro, Kentucky | Active | |
| **Tennessee Lambda** | October 4, 2016 – 20xx ?; October 31, 2022 | University of Memphis | Memphis, Tennessee | Active | |
| **Wisconsin Iota** | October 6, 2016 | Carroll University | Waukesha, Wisconsin | Active | |
| **Maryland Mu** | October 19, 2016 – 20xx ?; July 30, 2024 | Johns Hopkins University | Baltimore, Maryland | Active | |
| Pennsylvania Alpha Beta | October 23, 2016 – 2022 | University of the Sciences | Philadelphia, Pennsylvania | Inactive | (Note: The University of Sciences merged into Saint Joseph's University on June 1, 2022.) |
| **Pennsylvania Alpha Omicron** | October 29, 2016 – 20xx ?; December 2022 | Bloomsburg University of Pennsylvania | Bloomsburg, Pennsylvania | Active | |
| **New York Alpha Nu** | November 1, 2016 – 201x ?; April 3, 2019 | Alfred State College | Alfred, New York | Active | |
| North Dakota Beta | December 5, 2016 | University of Jamestown | Jamestown, North Dakota | Inactive | |
| Pennsylvania Alpha Gamma | January 6, 2017 | Immaculata University | East Whiteland Township, Pennsylvania | Inactive | |
| Pennsylvania Alpha Delta | January 25, 2017 | Villanova University | Villanova, Pennsylvania | Inactive | |
| **Georgia Theta** | February 15, 2017 | Morehouse College | Atlanta, Georgia | Inactive | |
| Georgia Iota | February 26, 2017 | University of West Georgia | Carrollton, Georgia | Inactive | |
| Pennsylvania Alpha Zeta | March 3, 2017 – c. 2022 | Cabrini University | Radnor Township, Pennsylvania | Inactive | |
| **Pennsylvania Alpha Lambda** | March 3, 2017 – 201x ?; February 13, 2019 | Muhlenberg College | Allentown, Pennsylvania | Active | |
| **New Hampshire Theta** | March 19, 2017 – 20xx ?; April 27, 2021 | Keene State College | Keene, New Hampshire | Active | |
| Washington Delta | April 1, 2017 | Saint Martin's University | Lacey, Washington | Inactive | |
| **Missouri Theta** | April 3, 2017 – 20xx ?; February 9, 2024 | Culver–Stockton College | Canton, Missouri | Active | |
| **Missouri Iota** | April 3, 2017 – 201x ?; December 16, 2021 | Fontbonne University | Clayton, Missouri | Active | |
| Florida Lambda | April 10, 2017 | Stetson University | DeLand, Florida | Inactive | |
| **Pennsylvania Alpha Eta** | April 27, 2017 – 20xx ?; August 17, 2021 | Moravian University | Bethlehem, Pennsylvania | Active | |
| **Pennsylvania Alpha Mu** | April 29, 2017 – 201x ?; July 9, 2019 | Lycoming College | Williamsport, Pennsylvania | Active | |
| **Michigan Theta** | August 30, 2017 | Davenport University | Kent County, Michigan | Active | |
| **Illinois Alpha Epsilon** | September 30, 2017 – 20xx ?; February 4, 2025 | Augustana College | Rock Island, Illinois | Active | |
| **Indiana Upsilon** | September 30, 2017 | Wabash College | Crawfordsville, Indiana | Active | |
| **Ohio Sigma** | September 30, 2017 | Oberlin College | Oberlin, Ohio | Active | |
| **Ohio Tau** | September 30, 2017 | Ohio Wesleyan University | Delaware, Ohio | Active | |
| **Ohio Phi** | September 30, 2017 | Denison University | Granville, Ohio | Active | |
| **Ohio Chi** | September 30, 2017 | Hiram College | Hiram, Ohio | Active | |
| **Pennsylvania Alpha Theta** | September 30, 2017 – 20xx ?; January 16, 2020 | Allegheny College | Meadville, Pennsylvania | Active | |
| **Pennsylvania Alpha Iota** | September 30, 2017 | Pennsylvania College of Technology | Williamsport, Pennsylvania | Active | |
| Illinois Tau | October 20, 2017 | Eureka College | Eureka, Illinois | Inactive | |
| **Georgia Kappa** | October 23, 2017 | Emmanuel University | Franklin Springs, Georgia | Active | |
| New York Alpha Delta | November 7, 2017 – 2021 | Concordia College | Bronxville, New York | Inactive | (Note: Concordia College closed in 2021.) |
| Florida Mu | December 7, 2017 | Flagler College | St. Augustine, Florida | Inactive | |
| **Connecticut Eta** | February 1, 2018 | Western Connecticut State University | Danbury, Connecticut | Active | |
| **Connecticut Theta** | March 1, 2018 | University of Hartford | West Hartford, Connecticut | Active | |
| **Pennsylvania Alpha Omega** | June 29, 2018 – 20xx ?; December 12, 2022 | Kutztown University of Pennsylvania | Kutztown, Pennsylvania | Active | |
| **New York Beta Gamma** | July 16, 2018 – 20xx ?; October 15, 2024 | Nazareth University | Pittsford, New York | Active | |
| **New Mexico Alpha** | July 19, 2018 – 20xx ?; April 2021 | Western New Mexico University | Silver City, New Mexico | Active | |
| **New York Alpha Epsilon** | July 19, 2018 – 20xx ?; May 2020 – 202x ? January 28, 2025 | State University of New York at Cobleskill | Cobleskill, New York | Active | |
| New York Alpha Zeta | July 23, 2018 | John Jay College of Criminal Justice | New York City, New York | Inactive | |
| New York Alpha Eta | August 4, 2018 | Hofstra University | Hempstead, New York | Inactive | |
| **Louisiana Kappa** | August 22, 2018 | Tulane University | New Orleans, Louisiana | Active | |
| **Pennsylvania Alpha Kappa** | August 22, 2018 – 20xx ?; February 29, 2024 | Penn State Schuylkill | Schuylkill Haven, Pennsylvania | Active | |
| **New York Alpha Theta** | September 11, 2018 – 20xx ?; January 24, 2023 | Keuka College | Keuka Park, New York | Active | |
| **New York Alpha Iota** | November 15, 2018 – 20xx ?; February 15, 2022 | Roberts Wesleyan University | Rochester, New York | Active | |
| New York Alpha Kappa | January 7, 2019 | Baruch College | New York City, New York | Inactive | |
| **Illinois Chi** | January 17, 2019 – 20xx ?; February 4, 2025 | Illinois College | Jacksonville, Illinois | Active | |
| **Iowa Iota** | January 17, 2019 – 20xx ?; August 15, 2024 | Wartburg College | Waverly, Iowa | Active | |
| **Ohio Alpha Alpha** | February 7, 2019 – 20xx ?; August 7, 2023 | Xavier University | Cincinnati, Ohio | Active | |
| **Pennsylvania Alpha Upsilon** | February 13, 2019 | Gettysburg College | Gettysburg, Pennsylvania | Active | |
| **West Virginia Epsilon** | February 14, 2019 – 20xx ?; August 22, 2024 | Shepherd University | Shepherdstown, West Virginia | Active | |
| **New York Alpha Upsilon** | February 19, 2019 – 20xx ?; August 16, 2022 | Siena College | Loudonville, New York | Active | |
| **New York Alpha Chi** | March 6, 2019 – 20xx ?; November 8, 2022 | Manhattan College | The Bronx, New York | Active | |
| **Oklahoma Gamma** | March 18, 2019 | Northwestern Oklahoma State University | Alva, Oklahoma | Active | |
| **West Virginia Zeta** | April 16, 2019 – 20xx ?; February 5, 2025 | West Virginia Wesleyan College | Buckhannon, West Virginia | Active | |
| **Virginia Nu** | April 11, 2019 | Marymount University | Arlington County, Virginia | Active | |
| **Pennsylvania Alpha Pi** | July 9, 2019 | King's College | Wilkes-Barre, Pennsylvania | Active | |
| **Florida Nu** | July 10, 2019 | Barry University | Miami Shores, Florida | Active | |
| Virginia Xi | July 18, 2019 | Emory and Henry College | Emory, Virginia | Inactive | |
| Delaware Epsilon | August 13, 2019 – 2021 | Wesley College | Dover, Delaware | Inactive | (Note: The college was acquired by Delaware State University in 2021 and is now the DSU Downtown campus.) |
| **Mississippi Eta** | August 13, 2019 | Delta State University | Cleveland, Mississippi | Active | |
| **Pennsylvania Alpha Phi** | August 29, 2019 | Susquehanna University | Selinsgrove, Pennsylvania | Active | |
| **Pennsylvania Alpha Xi** | October 10, 2019 | Lincoln University | Oxford, Pennsylvania | Active | |
| **Minnesota Beta** | October 16, 2019 | Augsburg University | Minneapolis, Minnesota | Active | |
| **Michigan Iota** | November 12, 2019 | Lawrence Technological University | Southfield, Michigan | Active | |
| **Alaska Alpha** | November 14, 2019 | University of Alaska Anchorage | Anchorage, Alaska | Active | |
| **Connecticut Iota** | November 15, 2019 | Trinity College | Hartford, Connecticut | Active | |
| **Oklahoma Delta** | December 18, 2019 | Southwestern Oklahoma State University | Sayre, Oklahoma | Active | |
| **Arkansas Zeta** | January 29, 2020 | Southern Arkansas University | Magnolia, Arkansas | Active | |
| **Massachusetts Psi** | February 16, 2020 – 202x ?; April 5, 2023 | American International College | Springfield, Massachusetts | Active | |
| **Massachusetts Alpha Epsilon** | February 16, 2020 – 202x ?; November 22, 2024 | Endicott College | Beverly, Massachusetts | Active | |
| North Carolina Omicron | February 25, 2020 | East Carolina University | Greenville, North Carolina | Inactive | |
| **Virginia Omicron** | February 25, 2020 | Sweet Briar College | Sweet Briar, Virginia | Active | |
| Pennsylvania Alpha Rho | March 16, 2020 | DeSales University | Center Valley, Pennsylvania | Inactive | |
| **Maryland Omicron** | March 22, 2020 | Stevenson University | Baltimore County, Maryland | Active | |
| **Massachusetts Omega** | March 22, 2020 | Dean College | Franklin, Massachusetts | Active | |
| **California Mu** | April 7, 2020 | California State University, San Bernardino | San Bernardino, California | Active | |
| Texas Nu | April 16, 2020 | Texas State University | San Marcos, Texas | Inactive | |
| **Tennessee Iota** | May 5, 2020 – 202x ?; July 25, 2024 | University of Tennessee Southern | Pulaski, Tennessee | Active | |
| **New York Alpha Omicron** | May 24, 2020 | Wells College | Aurora, New York | Active | |
| Iowa Delta | July 17, 2020 | William Penn University | Oskaloosa, Iowa | Inactive | |
| Tennessee Kappa | August 5, 2020 | Johnson University | Kimberlin Heights, Tennessee | Inactive | |
| Texas Xi | August 5, 2020 | St. Mary's University, Texas | San Antonio, Texas | Inactive | |
| Indiana Phi | September 2, 2020 | Earlham College | Richmond, Indiana | Inactive | |
| **Oregon Zeta** | September 22, 2020 – 202x ?; October 21, 2024 | Southern Oregon University | Ashland, Oregon | Active | |
| **Minnesota Gamma** | October 1, 2020 | College of St. Scholastica | Duluth, Minnesota | Active | |
| **Ohio Omega** | October 14, 2020 | Ohio Northern University | Ada, Ohio | Active | |
| **Iowa Mu** | November 20, 2020 – 202x ?; September 4, 2024 | Cornell College | Mount Vernon, Iowa | Active | |
| **North Carolina Upsilon** | November 20, 2020 – 202x ?; March 28, 2023 | William Peace University | Raleigh, North Carolina | Active | |
| California Nu | February 16, 2021 | California State University, Dominguez Hills | Carson, California | Inactive | |
| **Minnesota Delta** | March 1, 2021 | St. Catherine University | Saint Paul, Minnesota | Active | |
| **Arkansas Eta** | April 16, 2021 | University of the Ozarks | Clarksville, Arkansas | Active | |
| **Arkansas Theta** | April 28, 2021 | Henderson State University | Arkadelphia, Arkansas | Active | |
| **Alabama Theta** | October 21, 2021 | University of Alabama in Huntsville | Huntsville, Alabama | Active | |
| **California Xi** | November 1, 2021 | California Polytechnic State University, San Luis Obispo | San Luis Obispo, California | Active | |
| **Oklahoma Epsilon** | February 8, 2022 | Northeastern State University | Tahlequah, Oklahoma | Active | |
| **New York Alpha Rho** | February 15, 2022 | Rochester Institute of Technology | Rochester, New York | Active | |
| **Alabama Iota** | March 6, 2022 | Alabama State University | Montgomery, Alabama | Active | |
| **Pennsylvania Alpha Chi** | March 21, 2022 | Wilson College | Chambersburg, Pennsylvania | Active | |
| **New York Alpha Sigma** | March 23, 2022 | SUNY Polytechnic Institute | Albany, New York | Active | |
| **Minnesota Zeta** | April 20, 2022 | College of Saint Benedict | St. Joseph, Minnesota | Active | |
| **New York Alpha Tau** | July 7, 2022 – 202x ?; April 5, 2023 | Daemen University | Amherst, New York | Active | |
| **Florida Xi** | July 11, 2022 | Lynn University | Boca Raton, Florida | Active | |
| **Montana Beta** | August 5, 2022 | University of Montana Western | Dillon, Montana | Active | |
| **Texas Omicron** | September 5, 2022 | Austin College | Sherman, Texas | Active | |
| **Virginia Pi** | September 9, 2022 | Shenandoah University | Winchester, Virginia | Active | |
| **West Virginia Eta** | December 6, 2022 | Bluefield State University | Bluefield, West Virginia | Active | |
| **Pennsylvania Alpha Psi** | December 12, 2022 | Delaware Valley University | Doylestown, Pennsylvania | Active | |
| **Wisconsin Kappa** | January 23, 2023 | University of Wisconsin–Parkside | Kenosha, Wisconsin | Active | |
| **South Carolina Lambda** | January 25, 2023 | Clinton College | Rock Hill, South Carolina | Active | |
| **Georgia Lambda** | February 6, 2023 | Berry College | Mount Berry, Georgia | Active | |
| **Texas Pi** | March 1, 2023 | East Texas Baptist University | Marshall, Texas | Active | |
| **New York Alpha Phi** | March 28, 2023 | Manhattanville College | Manhattan, New York | Active | |
| **Pennsylvania Beta Alpha** | March 29, 2023 | Keystone College | Northeastern Pennsylvania | Active | |
| **New York Alpha Psi** | April 5, 2023 – 202x ?; September 5, 2024 | Sarah Lawrence College | Yonkers, New York | Active | |
| **Minnesota Eta** | April 6, 2023 | Carleton College | Northfield, Minnesota | Active | |
| **Georgia Mu** | May 3, 2023 | Young Harris College | Young Harris, Georgia | Active | |
| **Montana Gamma** | July 20, 2023 | Rocky Mountain College | Billings, Montana | Active | |
| **Illinois Alpha Alpha** | August 9, 2023 – 202x ?; December 12, 2024 | University of Illinois Springfield | Springfield, Illinois | Active | |
| **Iowa Zeta** | August 9, 2023 | Buena Vista University | Storm Lake, Iowa | Active | |
| **Texas Rho** | August 18, 2023 | University of Texas at Dallas | Richardson, Texas | Active | |
| **Kansas Epsilon** | August 21, 2023 | Benedictine College | Atchison, Kansas | Active | |
| **Ohio Alpha Beta** | August 24, 2023 | Shawnee State University | Portsmouth, Ohio | Active | |
| **Pennsylvania Beta Beta** | August 28, 2023 | Penn State Harrisburg | Lower Swatara Township, Pennsylvania | Active | |
| **Alabama Kappa** | September 15, 2023 | Miles College | Fairfield, Alabama | Active | |
| **Pennsylvania Beta Gamma** | September 20, 2023 | Carlow University | Pittsburgh, Pennsylvania | Active | |
| **Michigan Kappa** | September 25, 2023 | Siena Heights University | Adrian, Michigan | Active | |
| **Pennsylvania Beta Delta** | October 20, 2023 | Wilkes University | Wilkes-Barre, Pennsylvania | Active | |
| **Texas Sigma** | October 20, 2023 | Texas Wesleyan University | Fort Worth, Texas | Active | |
| **Kentucky Kappa** | December 8, 2023 | Spalding University | Louisville, Kentucky | Active | |
| **California Omicron** | January 17, 2024 | University of San Diego | San Diego, California | Active | |
| **Virginia Rho** | January 23, 2024 | Old Dominion University | Norfolk, Virginia | Active | |
| **Indiana Omega** | February 7, 2024 | Hanover College | Hanover, Indiana | Active | |
| **South Carolina Mu** | February 7, 2024 | Lander University | Greenwood, South Carolina | Active | |
| **Missouri Kappa** | February 9, 2024 | William Jewell College | Liberty, Missouri | Active | |
| **Florida Omicron** | February 14, 2024 | University of Tampa | Tampa, Florida | Active | |
| **New York Beta Beta** | February 28, 2024 – 202x ?; January 7, 2025 | State University of New York at Oswego | Oswego, New York | Active | |
| **Pennsylvania Beta Epsilon** | February 29, 2024 | Juniata College | Huntingdon, Pennsylvania | Active | |
| **Florida Pi** | March 6, 2024 | Eckerd College | St. Petersburg, Florida | Active | |
| **Texas Upsilon** | April 9, 2024 | University of North Texas at Dallas | Dallas, Texas | Active | |
| **Florida Rho** | April 18, 2024 | Florida A&M University | Tallahassee, Florida | Active | |
| **District of Columbia Beta** | July 1, 2024 | University of the District of Columbia | Washington, D.C. | Active | |
| **Mississippi Theta** | July 17, 2024 | Mississippi University for Women | Columbus, Mississippi | Active | |
| **California Pi** | July 25, 2024 | Menlo College | Atherton, California | Active | |
| **Michigan Lambda** | July 29, 2024 | University of Michigan–Dearborn | Dearborn, Michigan | Active | |
| **Texas Phi** | July 29, 2024 | University of the Incarnate Word | San Antonio, Texas | Active | |
| **California Rho** | July 30, 2024 | Fresno Pacific University | Fresno, California | Active | |
| **Minnesota Theta** | August 22, 2024 | Bethel University | Arden Hills, Minnesota | Active | |
| **Minnesota Iota** | August 22, 2024 | Hamline University | Saint Paul, Minnesota | Active | |
| **Minnesota Kappa** | August 22, 2024 | Macalester College | Saint Paul, Minnesota | Active | |
| **Minnesota Lambda** | August 22, 2024 | Saint Mary's University of Minnesota | Winona, Minnesota | Active | |
| **Minnesota Mu** | August 22, 2024 | Concordia College | Moorhead, Minnesota | Active | |
| **Minnesota Nu** | August 22, 2024 | Gustavus Adolphus College | St. Peter, Minnesota | Active | |
| **Minnesota Xi** | August 22, 2024 | Saint John's University | Collegeville Township, Minnesota | Active | |
| **California Sigma** | September 17, 2024 | University of California, Santa Cruz | Santa Cruz, California | Active | |
| **Kansas Zeta** | September 20, 2024 | Fort Hays State University | Hays, Kansas | Active | |
| **Missouri Lambda** | September 20, 2024 | Northwest Missouri State University | Maryville, Missouri | Active | |
| **Missouri Mu** | September 20, 2024 | Missouri Western State University | St. Joseph, Missouri | Active | |
| **Missouri Nu** | September 20, 2024 | University of Central Missouri | Warrensburg, Missouri | Active | |
| **Oklahoma Zeta** | September 20, 2024 | Rogers State University | Claremore, Oklahoma | Active | |
| **Oklahoma Eta** | September 20, 2024 | University of Central Oklahoma | Edmond, Oklahoma | Active | |
| **Missouri Xi** | October 4, 2024 | Stephens College | Columbia, Missouri | Active | |
| **Georgia Nu** | October 8, 2024 | Clark Atlanta University | Atlanta, Georgia | Active | |
| **Alabama Lambda** | October 18, 2024 | Auburn University at Montgomery | Montgomery, Alabama | Active | |
| **Georgia Xi** | October 18, 2024 | Valdosta State University | Valdosta, Georgia | Active | |
| **Mississippi Iota** | October 18, 2024 | Mississippi College | Clinton, Mississippi | Active | |
| **Tennessee Mu** | October 18, 2024 | Austin Peay State University | Clarksville, Tennessee | Active | |
| **Tennessee Nu** | October 18, 2024 | Trevecca Nazarene University | Nashville, Tennessee | Active | |
| **Arizona Alpha** | October 21, 2024 | Arizona Christian University | Glendale, Arizona | Active | |
| **California Tau** | October 21, 2024 | Simpson University | Redding, California | Active | |
| **Idaho Alpha** | October 21, 2024 | College of Idaho | Caldwell, Idaho | Active | |
| **Montana Delta** | October 21, 2024 | Montana State University–Northern | Havre, Montana | Active | |
| **Montana Epsilon** | October 21, 2024 | University of Providence | Great Falls, Montana | Active | |
| **Montana Zeta** | October 21, 2024 | Montana Technological University | Butte, Montana | Active | |
| **Montana Eta** | October 21, 2024 | Carroll College | Helena, Montana | Active | |
| **New York Beta Delta** | October 21, 2024 | St. Joseph's University | Brooklyn, New York | Active | |
| **New York Beta Epsilon** | October 21, 2024 | Le Moyne College | DeWitt, New York | Active | |
| **New York Beta Zeta** | October 21, 2024 | St. Joseph's University, Long Island | Long Island, New York | Active | |
| **South Carolina Nu** | October 21, 2024 | Newberry College | Newberry, South Carolina | Active | |
| **District of Columbia Gamma** | October 30, 2024 | Catholic University of America | Washington, D.C. | Active | |
| **Pennsylvania Beta Zeta** | October 30, 2024 | Elizabethtown College | Elizabethtown, Pennsylvania | Active | |
| **Pennsylvania Beta Eta** | October 30, 2024 | University of Scranton | Scranton, Pennsylvania | Active | |
| **Massachusetts Alpha Gamma** | November 1, 2024 | University of Massachusetts Lowell | Lowell, Massachusetts | Active | |
| **Pennsylvania Beta Theta** | November 1, 2024 | Bryn Mawr College | Bryn Mawr, Pennsylvania | Active | |
| **Pennsylvania Beta Iota** | November 1, 2024 | Dickinson College | Carlisle, Pennsylvania | Active | |
| **Pennsylvania Beta Kappa** | November 1, 2024 | Franklin & Marshall College | Lancaster, Pennsylvania | Active | |
| **Pennsylvania Beta Lambda** | November 1, 2024 | Haverford College | Haverford, Pennsylvania | Active | |
| **Pennsylvania Beta Mu** | November 1, 2024 | Swarthmore College | Swarthmore, Pennsylvania | Active | |
| **Pennsylvania Beta Nu** | November 1, 2024 | Ursinus College | Collegeville, Pennsylvania | Active | |
| **California Upsilon** | November 5, 2024 | California State University, Stanislaus | Turlock, California | Active | |
| **Oklahoma Theta** | November 18, 2024 | Langston University | Langston, Oklahoma | Active | |
| **California Phi** | November 20, 2024 | Sonoma State University | Rohnert Park, California | Active | |
| **Ohio Alpha Gamma** | November 20, 2024 | Youngstown State University | Youngstown, Ohio | Active | |
| **Maryland Pi** | November 22, 2024 | McDaniel College | Westminster, Maryland | Active | |
| **Maryland Rho** | November 22, 2024 | Washington College | Chestertown, Maryland | Active | |
| **Maryland Sigma** | November 22, 2024 | University of Maryland, College Park | College Park, Maryland | Active | |
| **Pennsylvania Beta Xi** | December 4, 2024 | Bryn Athyn College | Bryn Athyn, Pennsylvania | Active | |
| **Pennsylvania Beta Omicron** | December 4, 2024 | Cairn University | Langhorne Manor, Pennsylvania | Active | |
| **Pennsylvania Beta Pi** | December 4, 2024 | Penn State Berks | Spring Township, Pennsylvania | Active | |
| **Pennsylvania Beta Rho** | December 4, 2024 | Penn State Abington | Abington, Pennsylvania | Active | |
| **Pennsylvania Beta Sigma** | December 4, 2024 | Penn State Brandywine | Middletown Township, Pennsylvania | Active | |
| **Pennsylvania Beta Tau** | December 4, 2024 | University of Valley Forge | Chester County, Pennsylvania | Active | |
| **California Chi** | December 12, 2024 | University of California, Los Angeles | Los Angeles, California | Active | |
| **California Psi** | December 12, 2024 | University of Southern California | Los Angeles, California | Active | |
| **Michigan Mu** | December 12, 2024 | University of Michigan | Ann Arbor, Michigan | Active | |
| **Michigan Nu** | December 12, 2024 | Michigan State University | East Lansing, Michigan | Active | |
| **Minnesota Omicron** | December 12, 2024 | University of Minnesota | Minneapolis, Minnesota | Active | |
| **Washington Zeta** | December 12, 2024 | University of Washington | Seattle, Washington | Active | |
| **New York Alpha Omega** | December 20, 2024 | Hartwick College | Oneonta, New York | Active | |
| **California Omega** | January 7, 2025 | California Institute of Technology | Pasadena, California | Active | |
| **California Alpha Alpha** | January 7, 2025 | California Lutheran University | Thousand Oaks, California | Active | |
| **California Alpha Beta** | January 7, 2025 | Claremont McKenna College, Harvey Mudd College, and Scripps College | Claremont, California | Active | |
| **California Alpha Gamma** | January 7, 2025 | Occidental College | Los Angeles, California | Active | |
| **California Alpha Delta** | January 7, 2025 | Pomona College and Pitzer College | Claremont, California | Active | |
| **California Alpha Epsilon** | January 7, 2025 | University of La Verne | La Verne, California | Active | |
| **California Alpha Zeta** | January 7, 2025 | University of Redlands | Redlands, California | Active | |
| **California Alpha Eta** | January 7, 2025 | Whittier College | Whittier, California | Active | |
| **Maine Delta** | January 7, 2025 | Husson University | Bangor, Maine | Active | |
| **Pennsylvania Beta Upsilon** | January 7, 2025 | Pennsylvania State University | University Park, Pennsylvania | Active | |
| **Pennsylvania Beta Phi** | January 7, 2025 | Commonwealth University-Mansfield | Mansfield, Pennsylvania | Active | |
| **Texas Omega** | January 31, 2025 | Hardin–Simmons University | Abilene, Texas | Active | |
| **Indiana Alpha Alpha** | February 5, 2025 | University of Indianapolis | Indianapolis, Indiana | Active | |
| **Michigan Xi** | February 5, 2025 | Ferris State University | Big Rapids, Michigan | Active | |
| **Michigan Omicron** | February 5, 2025 | Grand Valley State University | Allendale, Michigan | Active | |
| **Michigan Pi** | February 5, 2025 | Lake Superior State University | Sault Ste. Marie, Michigan | Active | |
| **Texas Alpha Alpha** | February 6, 2025 | Schreiner University | Kerrville, Texas | Active | |
| **California Alpha Theta** | February 10, 2025 | California State University, Northridge | Los Angeles, California | Active | |
| **New Jersey Upsilon** | February 18, 2025 | Saint Peter's University | Jersey City, New Jersey | Active | |
| **South Dakota Alpha** | February 19, 2005 – 20xx ?; October 21, 2024 | Dakota State University | Madison, South Dakota | Active | |
| **Missouri Omicron** | February 21, 2025 | University of Missouri–St. Louis | St. Louis, Missouri | Active | |
| **Illinois Alpha Iota** | February 22, 2025 | Principia College | Elsah, Illinois | Active | |
| **New York Beta Eta** | March 13, 2025 | St. John Fisher University | Pittsford, New York | Active | |
| **Iowa Xi** | March 25, 2025 | Grinnell College | Grinnell, Iowa | Active | |
| **Louisiana Lambda** | March 25, 2025 | Dillard University | New Orleans, Louisiana | Active | |
| **Virginia Sigma** | April 9, 2025 | Virginia State University | Ettrick, Virginia | Active | |
| **Virginia Alpha** | August 29, 2005 | Bridgewater College | Bridgewater, Virginia | Active | |
| Indiana Chi | | | | Unassigned | |
| Indiana Psi | | | | Unassigned | |
| Louisiana Iota | | | | Unassigned | |
| South Carolina Gamma | | | | Inactive | |
| Texas Chi | | | | Unassigned | |
| Texas Psi | | | | Unassigned | |
