= Emma Elizabeth Johnson =

American educator

Emma Elizabeth Johnson (née Strawn; 1863–1927) was an American educator who served as president of Johnson Bible College (now Johnson University), in Knoxville, Tennessee, from 1925 until her death. She was one of the first American women to serve as president of a co-educational university.

Johnson was born in Ontario, Canada. In 1884, she married Ashley S. Johnson, an evangelical minister from Tennessee. They moved to South Carolina after their marriage, where they engaged in church planting and Ashley started a correspondence school for Bible studies. In 1893, the Johnsons moved back to Tennessee and opened "The School of the Evangelists" on an old family property in Kimberlin Heights; it was renamed Johnson Bible College in 1909, and later became known by its current name, Johnson University.

As well as serving as a professor of Biblical studies, Johnson oversaw the financial aspects of the college, serving as treasurer and registrar. She was vice-president to her husband, and became known as the college's "matriarch". When her husband died in January 1925, she succeeded him as president – the first female college president in the United States outside of women's colleges. Johnson was keen to maintain the university's independence, rejecting an offer to join the conservative Christian Restoration Association. She died of cancer in May 1927, and bequeathed all her possessions to the college. Her only child was born in 1891, but died at birth; the complications rendered her infertile.

== See also ==
- List of women presidents or chancellors of co-ed colleges and universities
