= Narrative preaching =

Over the last few decades in the United States, some homiletical theorists and preachers have questioned the hegemony of the traditional rhetorical approaches to preaching. Many alternative styles and approaches have been developed, many of which are called "narrative" in either style or content.

Narrative Preaching (also known as "the New Homiletic") is a branch of homiletics that developed in the 20th century. The term "Narrative" refers to the style of the sermon, not its content; many Narrative Style sermons contain no stories at all. Narrative Preaching is a deliberate break from "the Old Homiletic," the traditional style of Christian preaching derived ultimately from Augustine of Hippo's championship of using Greek forms of rhetoric derived from Aristotle's Rhetoric and Poetics. "The Old Homiletic" was based on reasoning in which a general thesis is stated which leads to particular applications and proofs. "The New Homiletic," in contrast, is based on reasoning in which particular details lead both the preacher and the congregation to new ways of thinking.

== Narrative Homiletics: Common Characteristics ==
The New Homiletic is a reaction against propositional preaching. It requires the preacher to take an expectant, imaginative stance before the biblical text. The goal of the sermon is a transformative event, often requiring a strategic delay of meaning. In other words, the preacher does not give the congregation the thesis or point at the beginning of the sermon; they are required to follow along as the preacher explores the text and its meaning. Language is used carefully to produce the desired effect; what language does is considered more important than what it says. Poetic and metaphorical language is privileged. Stories and metaphors are points; they do not illustrate them.

The sermon is structured in such a way that an early imbalance or disconnect leads to some sort of resolution by the end of the sermon; a story is not required. Stories function as the structure and logic of the sermon, not necessarily its content.

== The Old Homiletic ==
The majority of Christian sermons have historically been preached using rhetorical and logical styles derived from Greek philosophy and rhetoric. The preacher would start with a thesis and prove it using a variety of techniques including Scriptural citation, story, and a series of logical deductions. This was the model used, for example, by John A. Broadus in his 1870 text on preaching, A Treatise on the Preparation and Delivery of Sermons, which was the standard homiletics manual in English-speaking non-Catholic seminaries for over seventy years and shaped generations of preachers. Proof-texting, in which small pieces of Scripture are taken out of context to "prove" the speaker's point, is a particular hazard of this style of preaching.

== Preludes to a Narrative Homiletic ==
Development of the "new" or "narrative" homiletic came from a combination of new ways of thinking in theological, philosophical, and Biblical studies.

=== Theology ===
Neo-orthodoxy was a movement that called theologians to disengage themselves from popular/philosophical movements by letting scripture define itself. It was championed by Karl Barth and Emil Brunner. This was not a fundamentalist or literalist view of the text; it was instead a call to listen to what the text said without reducing it to rhetoric or depending on natural theology. It inspired Narrative Theology, a movement that developed at Yale Divinity School and also contributed to the development of the New Homiletic. The Biblical Theology movement, championed by H. Richard Niebuhr, emphasized narrative structure and particularity.

There are three variations on the narrative theme. In the first variation, the structure of Biblical narrative equals the structure of reality. Hans Frei argues that the historical-critical method separates truth from fact by ignoring what is "behind" the text. Sallie McFague argues that all understanding comes through metaphor. In the second variation, associated with Paul van Buren, the doctrine is embedded in the story to the extent that philosophical categorization or discussion of theology outside the narrative is useless. The third variation, associated with Stanley Hauerwas, deals with narrative ethics: we see the world the way we've been trained to see it through the stories we've been told, both large and small; how a person tells his or her stories defines how that person thinks.

=== Philosophy ===
Narrative preaching is based on the philosophical belief that language creates reality. If you cannot say something, you cannot experience it. Language is what creates people and communities. Communication is not about content, it is about connecting in the moment. The New Hermeneutic, associated with Ernst Fuchs and Gerhard Ebeling, argued that parables are more than "mere" fables—they create a world in themselves. The story is the reality. Paul Ricoeur and Stephen Crites also developed hermeneutical arguments regarding the interaction of language and meaning.

=== Biblical Studies ===
Several theologians, including Robert W. Funk, Amos Wilder, Dan O. Via, and John Dominic Crossan, have made contributions in the area of rhetorical and literary critical approaches to biblical studies. Their various contributions to the field include the idea that form and content cannot be separated; what the text does is as important as what it says. They argue that texts don't just have a past, they have a present and a future through their readers and hearers. Walter Brueggmann argues that in preaching, we construct an alternate world.

== Early Pioneers and their contributions ==
Henry Grady Davis: the sermon is an organic thing.

David Randolph: the story was the point; a preacher should show, not tell.

Charles Rice: a sermon isn't a lecture hall

Edmund Steimle: a sermon should weave together the Biblical story and our story.

Henry Mitchell: sermons should be approached organically, using poetic language and celebration.

Fred Craddock: a sermon should move from examples to a thesis, taking the congregation through an encounter with the text.
