= Ashley S. Johnson =

American Protestant minister

Ashley Sydney Johnson (1857–1925) was a Protestant minister who founded Johnson University in Tennessee.

Ashley S. Johnson born in East Tennessee on June 22, 1857, and by age sixteen was a school teacher in the Knox County School System. At age seventeen, he enrolled at the University of Tennessee for one year and afterwards attended Hiram College in Hiram, Ohio, where he received an A.M. Johnson received an LL.D. from Christian University (now, Culver-Stockton College) in Canton, Missouri. In October 1877 after studying the New Testament, Johnson preached his first sermon and decided to dedicate his life to ministry. In 1884, Johnson enrolled in oration school in Ontario Canada. It was here that he met his future wife Emma Elizabeth Strawn.

Johnson married Emma Elizabeth Strawn in Dunnville in Ontario, Canada on December 31, 1884, and they moved first to Tennessee and then to South Carolina to be evangelists, starting churches and encouraging the growth of existent churches.

While serving as the state evangelist in South Carolina, Johnson founded a popular Correspondence Bible School in 1886. Johnson felt that he could better train the students at a resident school with the goal of training preachers, especially those who could not afford to pay for it, Johnson founded The School of the Evangelist in 1893 on farm land which had formerly been owned by his great-grandfather along the French Broad River.

In 1891, Emma gave birth to a stillborn child and almost died herself during childbirth, and she was unable to have further children. Ashley Johnson went on to write numerous books and articles. Johnson died during an operation in Baltimore, Maryland, on January 14, 1925, and was buried on the Heights on the college campus. Emma Johnson died of cancer two years later and was buried next to her husband.

== Works ==
- "The Busy Man's Bible Encyclopedia,"
- "The Eternal Spirit, His Word and Works,"
- "Moses or Christ, Which?"
- "The Great Controversy" in 1882,
- "The Life of Trust,"
- "Opening The Book Of The Seven Seals,"
- "The Holy Spirit And The Human Mind,"
- "The Two Covenants,"
- "The Self-Interpreting New Testament,"
- "Outline Study Of God's Eternal Purpose,"
- "Thirteen Expository Sermons On Hebrews,"
- "Debate With A Baptist,"
- "Ten Evangelistic Sermons,"
