= Fred Craddock =

American preacher and academic (1928–2015)

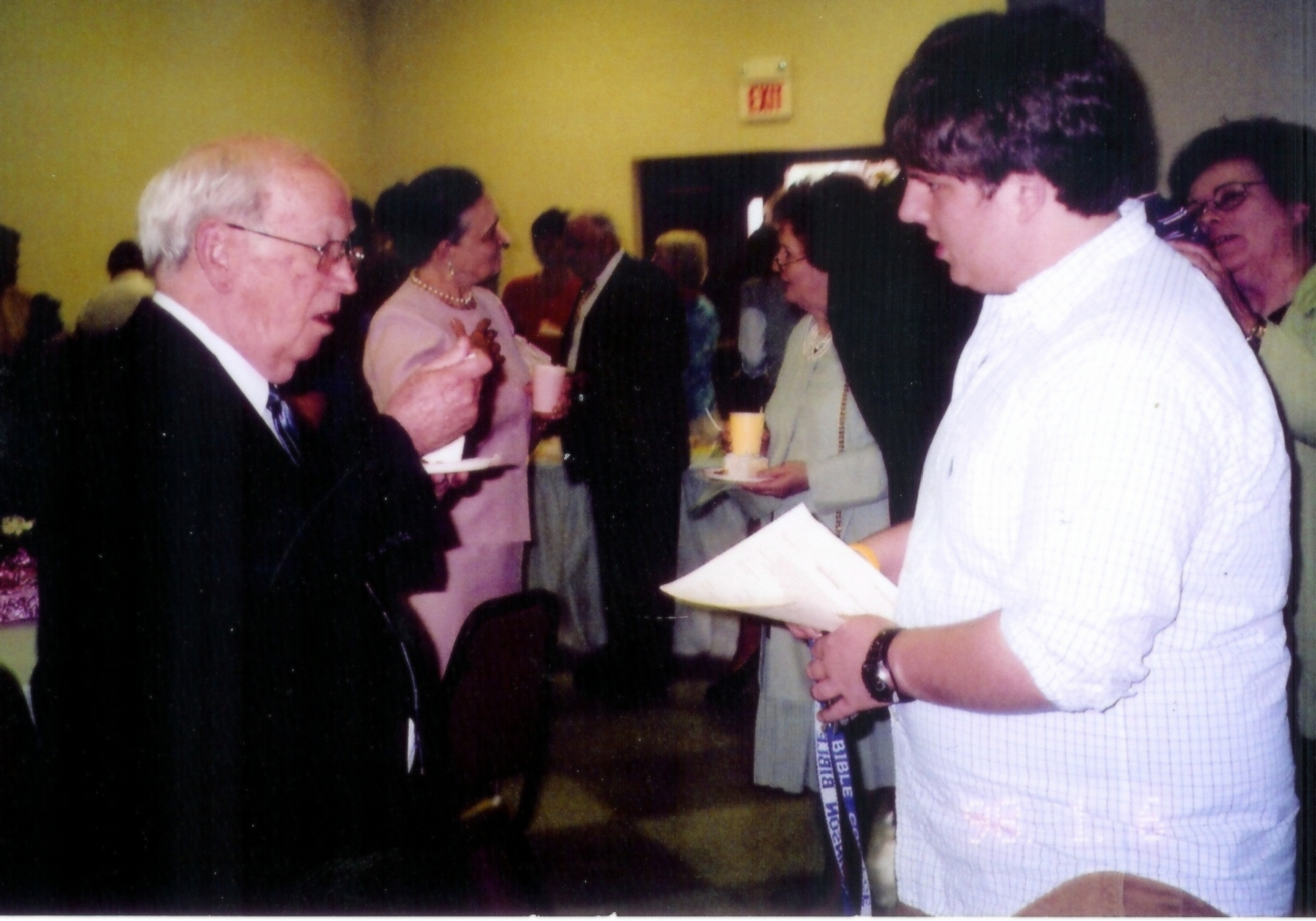
- Craddock discussing homiletics with a student
- Born: Fred Brenning Craddock Jr. April 30, 1928; Humboldt, Tennessee, U.S.
- Died: March 6, 2015 (aged 86); Blue Ridge, Georgia, U.S.
- Occupations: Preacher, Professor
- Spouse: Nettie Dungan (m. 1950–2015)
- Children: John Craddock; Laura Craddock

Fred Brenning Craddock Jr. (April 30, 1928 – March 6, 2015) was Bandy Distinguished Professor of Preaching and New Testament Emeritus in the Candler School of Theology at Emory University. He was an ordained minister of the Christian Church (Disciples of Christ) from rural Tennessee. He was the director of the Craddock Center, a non-profit service group which operates in rural Appalachia.

== Written works ==
Craddock has written a number of books, including The Pre-Existence of Christ (1968), As One Without Authority (1971, rev. 1974 and 1979), Overhearing the Gospel (1978), The Gospels (1981), commentaries on John (1982) and Philippians (1984), Preaching (1985), a commentary on Luke (1990) and a collection of sermon-related anecdotes (Craddock Stories. 2001). Craddock has also contributed articles to various journals.

== Preaching style ==
There are at least three major features of Craddock's new homiletic that distinguish it from traditional homiletics. First, instead of using a traditional deductive approach, in which three points are named and illustrated, in his sermons, Craddock advocates an inductive style. Critiquing traditional homiletics—called the "old homiletic"—Craddock turned toward induction, in which the preacher re-creates for the listener the inductive process of study used to create the sermon itself. A second unique feature of Craddock's new homiletic is that a sermon should seek to create an experience for the listener, rather than attempting to gain the listeners' assent through sermons using deductive, linear logic. As a result of Craddock's inductive model, the role of the listeners fundamentally changes: no longer are listeners passive recipients of a conclusion already reached by the authoritative preacher, to which they must acquiesce. Rather, in Craddock's scheme, the listeners are active participants in the sermon by virtue of the sermon form itself, which enables the hearer to "finish" the sermon that is intentionally left open-ended. A key assumption of this model, as Craddock notes, is that listeners share a common universal experience, ensuring that the listener's mental processes will work in the same way as the preacher's, thus recreating the same type of experience. This assumption would be later challenged by, among others, John McClure. Third, Craddock emphasizes that the form or genre of the biblical passage to be preached should shape in some way the form taken by the sermon (a claim also made by Tom Long). While Craddock does not require that a sermon slavishly adhere to the biblical form—a psalm need not be preached entirely as a poetic sermon—he argues that various biblical forms seek to accomplish a variety of rhetorical aims; as such, the sermon should attempt to "do what the text does" in both the "what" (content) and the "how" (rhetorical strategies) of the text.

Craddock offers an inductive approach to preaching with an aim of active participation by the listener in the movement of the sermon as well as in the discerning of the message. His grounding principle is that good preaching is a socializing force that creates community.

Often characterized as preaching with a style that is "folksy," Craddock is known for using humour in sermons. Newsweek ranked him as one of America's greatest preachers. Craddock's new homiletic has influenced further generations of homileticians who have developed new sermon forms while holding to certain values found within the new homiletic: narrative preaching, phenomenological preaching, and conversational preaching, to name a few.

== Lectures ==
Highly sought after as a lecturer, he delivered the Lyman Beecher Lectures at Yale, the Scott Lectures at Claremont School of Theology, the Adams Lectures at Southeastern Baptist Seminary, the Schaff Lectures at Pittsburgh Theological Seminary, the Sprinkle Lectures at Barton College (formerly Atlantic Christian College), the Cole Lectures at Vanderbilt, the Westervelt Lectures at Austin Presbyterian Seminary, the Mullins Lectures at Southern Seminary, and the Earl Lectures at Pacific School of Religion. He served as invited plenary speaker at the Christian Scholars Conference. Craddock was the 2007 Founder's Day speaker at Johnson University, where he completed his undergraduate degree, and taught in the fields of Bible and Homiletics.

Craddock was succeeded on the Emory faculty by Carl R. Holladay.

== Personal life ==
Craddock was born in 1928 to Fred Sr. and Ethel Craddock. He had three brothers and a sister. Craddock married Nettie Dungan in June 1950, upon his graduation from Johnson Bible College. They had two children, John and Laura.
