= Adam Zachary Newton =

Adam Zachary Newton is an American academic. He has served as university professor, Stanton Chair in Literature and Humanities, and chair of the Department of English at Yeshiva University. His previous appointment was as Jane and Rowland Blumberg Centennial Professor at the University of Texas at Austin, where he taught in the English Department, the Committee on Comparative Literature, the Department of Middle Eastern Studies, and the Program in Jewish Studies. More recently, he has held appointments as distinguished visiting professor at Emory University and Agnes Scott College in Atlanta, Georgia.

Newton is a graduate of Haverford College and has a Ph.D. from Harvard University (1992). While at Harvard, his book, Narrative ethics, "sought a bridge between the disciplines of ethical philosophy and literary studies by proposing a new way to think about the moral realms of risk and responsibility as problems of reading." He defines narrative ethics as "the ethical consequences of narrating story... and the reciprocal claims binding teller, listener, witness, and reader in that process." Other scholars apply his approach and find new ways to read old books.

His publications in the fields of literary studies, philosophy, and religion include six monographs, an edited volume, and a body of critical articles.

Newton married Miriam Udel in 2011, who had read his book Narrative ethics twice, years before meeting him.

== Bibliography ==
Books

- —. (1999). Facing Black and Jew: literature as public space in twentieth-century America. Cultural margins. Cambridge, UK: Cambridge University Press. ISBN 0-511-00615-2
- —. (1992). Narrative ethics the intersubjective claim of fiction. Mass., Harvard Univ., Diss., 1992—Cambridge. OCLC 180587177
- —. (2005) The elsewhere: on belonging at a near distance : reading literary memoir from Europe and the Levant. Madison, Wis: University of Wisconsin Press. ISBN 0-299-20890-7
- —. (2001). The fence and the neighbor: Emmanuel Levinas, Yeshayahu Leibowitz, and Israel among the nations. SUNY series in Jewish philosophy. Albany, NY: State University of New York Press. ISBN 0-7914-4783-9

Journal articles

- —. (1996). From Exegesis to Ethics: Recognition and Its Vicissitudes in Saul Bellow and Chester Himes. The South Atlantic Quarterly. 95, no. 4: 979. OCLC 91843318
- —. (2001). Versions of Ethics; Or, The SARL of Criticism: Sonority, Arrogation, Letting-Be. American Literary History. 13 (3), 603–637. OCLC 88051868
- —. (1998). ARTICLES – "Nothing But Face" -- "To Hell with Philosophy"?: Witold Gombrowicz, Bruno Schulz, and the Scandal of Human Countenance. Style. 32 (2), 243. OCLC 95198199
- —. (1996). Is Jew/Greek Greek/Jew; or does 'Hebrew' mean Cross-over? the Tightrope, the Window, and the Text- an Excursus on Identity. Social Identities. 2 (1), 93. OCLC 88321843

== Prizes ==
- 1993, Narrative ethics the intersubjective claim of fiction, Thomas J. Wilson Prize, Harvard University Press
