= Narrative ethics =

Concept in virtue ethics

Narrative ethics is an approach that focuses on personal identity through story, and particular events in the life story of the individual or community. These form a basis for ethical reflection and learning, both for individuals or groups. In many respects it resembles or presupposes virtue ethics.

Anna Gotlib observes that rather than being a single theory, narrative ethics encompasses "a number of views and practices that have a family resemblance, and can be construed as a part of a larger, more amorphous field of narrative ethics." The use of narrative has been especially influential in bioethics and feminist ethics.

== Narrative ethics and bioethics ==
Clive Baldwin distinguishes between “narratively informed ethics” and what can be properly called “narrative ethics”. The former may include using narratives (be that literary fiction or real people’s stories) to improve our moral sensibilities, gain new moral insights, or inform ethical reflection and deliberation, while the latter is seen as a group of approaches that seek a more robust role for narratives in ethical reasoning and action. In this latter sense narrative itself can be seen as an independent form of ethical reasoning and decision-making.

According to Jennifer Flynn, some usages of narrative are compatible with traditional moral theorizing. As such, narratives can be used as a supplement to principle-based moral reasoning. In this role, they can make us more sensitive towards the first-person stories of moral stakeholders, such as patients, caregivers, and family members. As Flynn suggests, another way to look at this complementary relationship is through the process of reflective equilibrium, where both narrative and moral principles can play an important role.

Alternatively, as an independent ethical framework, narrative ethics may offer an independent decision-procedure, where a given decision is evaluated in terms of how well it coheres with a relevant narrative or story.

Baldwin provides some of the major books and collections of works on the role of narrative in bioethics:

- Howard Brody's Stories of Sickness (1987)
- Arthur Kleinman’s The Illness Narratives (1989)
- Stories and their limits: Narrative approaches to bioethics
- Stories matter: The role of narrative in medical ethics
- Todd Chambers' The Fiction in Bioethics
- The American Journal of Bioethics, Volume 1, Issue 1 (2001)
- The Hastings Center Report, Volume 44, Issue s1

== Narrative ethics and feminist ethics ==
Anna Gotlib describes the relationship between narrative and feminist ethics as dynamic and sharing overlapping aspects, e.g., both emphasizing the contextuality of moral reflection. However, "this is not to suggest that all (or even most) of feminist ethics employs narrative methodologies, or that all (or most) feminist ethicists are narrativists."

== Criticism ==
=== In bioethics ===
Baldwin writes that the use of narrative to improve our moral sensibilities and enhance our moral reasoning is seldom controversial. On the other hand, the more robust understanding is subject to criticism. Jennifer Flynn notes that the general worry concerns the relationship between narrative and moral evaluation, moral decision-making and moral justification. Some important criticisms have been made by Tom Tomlinson.

More generally, Galen Strawson has argued against both the empirical claim about the supposedly fundamental role of narrative in structuring our ordinary experience, and the normative claim that "we ought to live our lives narratively, or as a story."

== See also ==
- Adam Zachary Newton
- Alasdair MacIntyre
- Aretaic turn
- Hilde Lindemann
- Martha Nussbaum
