= Johnson University =

Christian university in Kimberlin Heights, Tennessee, US

Coordinates: 35°56′10.32″N 83°45′1.44″W

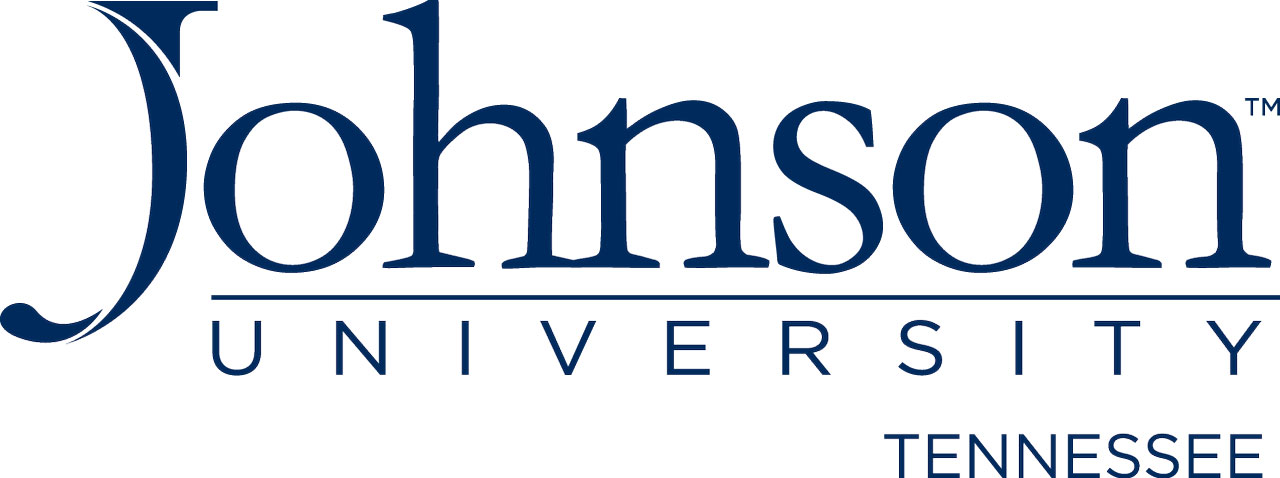
- Former names: The School of the Evangelists (1893–1909); Johnson Bible College (1909–2011)
- Motto: Faith, Prayer, Work
- Type: Private university
- Established: 1893
- Religious affiliation: Christian churches and churches of Christ
- Endowment: $139.3 million (2024)
- President: Daniel Overdorf
- Provost: Gregory Linton
- Faculty: 61
- Students: 1005 (2024-25)
- Location: Kimberlin Heights, Tennessee, United States
- Campus: Rural 300 acres (1.2 km^{2})
- Colors: Navy Blue, Gray and White
- Nickname: Royals
- Sporting affiliations: NAIA – Appalachian
- Website: http://johnsonu.edu

Johnson University is a private Christian university headquartered in Kimberlin Heights, Tennessee, United States. Rooted in the tenets of the Restoration Movement, it maintains affiliation with the Christian churches and churches of Christ.

== History ==
Johnson University was established in 1893 by Ashley S. Johnson. It began as an extension of the Correspondence Bible College under the name "The School of the Evangelists". In 1909, following a student petition to honor the founder, the institution was renamed Johnson Bible College. This title endured until July 1, 2011, when the college transitioned to Johnson University.

The inception of the school was introduced in a sermon by Ashley S. Johnson at Bearden Christian Church in 1892, proposing a college-level institution dedicated to the gospels. Guests embarked on a steamboat journey from Knoxville in May 1893 to witness the laying of the cornerstone for the Main Building, completed in 1895 with a distinctive five-story square tower. However, on December 1, 1904 a fire originating from a chimney razed the original Main Building. In its place, rose a new brick structure dedicated in 1905.

The school experienced significant growth following the dedication of the "New" Main Building, leading to the construction of Irwin Library in 1912. Johnson's leadership persisted until his death in 1925, after which his wife, Emma Elizabeth Johnson, assumed the presidency until her death in 1927.

Alva Ross Brown became the third president at the recommendation of Emma Johnson, becoming one of the youngest college presidents in the United States at 21 years old. Brown's tenure lasted until his death in 1941.

Following the death of Brown, the trustees appointed Robert M Bell as the fourth president. Under Bell's leadership, the college navigated financial challenges and expanded its academic, financial, and physical infrastructure until his death in 1968.

David L. Eubanks assumed the presidency in 1969, overseeing continued academic expansion and the construction of new facilities, until his retirement in 2007.

Gary E. Weedman succeeded him, guiding the institution's transition into a university and fostering partnerships with other institutions and countries until his retirement in June 2018.

L. Thomas Smith Jr. then assumed the presidency, overseeing significant expansions, including the construction of the Graham Center and the Commons on the Florida campus. Smith announced his retirement in late 2023, with Daniel Overdorf selected as his successor before February 2024.

=== Presidents ===
Ashley Johnson, the first president and co-founder with his wife, authored the Condensed Biblical Encyclopedia. When Emma Elizabeth Johnson took the reins in 1925, she was one of the earliest women to lead a college in the United States.

President	Term
Ashley S. Johnson (founder)	1893−1925
Emma Elizabeth Johnson (founder)	1925−1927
Alva Ross Brown	1927−1941
Robert M. Bell	1941−1968
David L. Eubanks	1969−2007
Gary E. Weedman	2007−2018
L. Thomas Smith	2018−2024
Daniel Overdorf	July 1, 2024 -

== Academics ==
Johnson University awards associate, bachelors', master's, and doctoral degrees. It offers over 70 different academic programs organized into seven schools:

=== Accreditation ===
Johnson University was first accredited in 1979 by the Commission on Colleges of the Southern Association of Colleges and Schools. The university is approved by the Tennessee Higher Education Commission (THEC) to operate as a degree-granting educational institution.

Programs in the School of Bible & Theology and the School of Congregational Ministry are both accredited by the Commission on Accreditation of the Association for Biblical Higher Education. The Council for Accreditation of Counseling and Related Educational Programs accredits the School of Social and Behavioral Sciences in the concentrations of Clinical Mental Health Counseling (M.A.) and School Counseling (M.A.).

== Campuses ==
The university has one physical campus and an online campus. The Tennessee campus is located in the upper Tennessee River valley on the banks of the French Broad River. The online campus is also located on the Tennessee Campus.

The Florida Campus, Johnson University Florida, was located at the site of the former Florida Christian College, in Kissimmee, Florida, 20 miles (32 km) south of downtown Orlando, Florida. This campus closed on June 30, 2024.

Since its founding, Johnson University has had many different buildings. While many are still in use, some have been refurbished and repurposed while a few have been demolished.

=== Academic buildings ===
- Myrtle Hall – Built 1951 (School of Social & Behavioral Sciences, former women's dormitory)
- Glass Memorial Library – Built 1964, enlarged 1989
- Phillips−Welshimer Building - Built 1975 (Schools of Arts & Sciences, Bible & Theology, Business & Public Leadership, Congregational Ministry, Administrative/Faculty Offices, Chapel/Auditorium)
- Eubanks Activity Center – Built 1989 (Office of President, Student Commons, Science Labs, School of Communication & Creative Arts)
- Richardson Hall – Built 2001 (Templar School of Education, School of Intercultural Studies, School of Business and Public Leadership)
- Russell Preaching Center – Renovated 2007 (Location of former Dining Hal in Phillips-Welshimer Building)
- Music & Plant Services Building – Built 2018 (Music Department & Plant Services Complex)
- The Graham Center – Athletic & Recreation Complex – Built 2019

=== Campus life ===
- Clark Hall - Built 1905 (Men's Dorm - Part of Old Main Building. Basement Dining Hall 1905-1955. Renovated in the early 1980s)
- Bell Hall – Built 1955 (Apartments - Basement was the dining hall from 1955 to 1976)
- Brown Hall – Built 2000 (Men's Dorm)
- Johnson Hall – Built 2000 (Women's Dorm)
- Gally Commons – Built 2007 (Dining Hall, Private Function Rooms, Campus Store and Student Post Office & Package Center)
- River View – Built 2008 (Home of the President of the University)

=== Historic facilities ===
- The White House – Built 1890 (Restored home of Dr. and Mrs. Johnson - VIP Housing Location & Smaller Gatherings)
- Old Main Building – Built 1905 (Old Chapel & Archeological Museum)
- Old Gymnasium & Pool – Built 1949
- Alumni Memorial Chapel – Built 1961

=== Former facilities ===
- Original Main Building – 1893–1904 (Wooden building, five story tower with bell, located at the current site of the Old Main Building).
- Industrial Hall "Old Dusty" – 1898–1960 (Wooden building located near the site Alumni Memorial Chapel). The Lower level contained the wood shops with Women's dorm rooms on upper floor.
- The Dairy Barn, Late 1800s until the 1970s, occupied the site where the Phillips-Welshimer Building stands today. It served as the residence for the esteemed dairy herd known as the Dixie Holstein Herd. This herd had the main bull being the grandson of the prize winning bull at the Louisiana Purchase Exposition.
- Tabor Science Laboratory - 1920s to 1970s
- Irwin Library, which stood from 1912 to 2000, was a three-story brick building situated next to the Old Main Building. Originally established as the location of the second college library, it also housed several classrooms. The library was notable for its decoration with Pink Tennessee Marble, much of which can now be found in the sidewalk leading to Richardson Hall.
- Old Brown Hall – 1971–2000 (3 story facility, former men's dormitory)
- Old Johnson Hall – 1972–2000 (3 story facility, former women's dormitory)

== Athletics ==
The athletic teams of the Johnson–Tennessee (JUTN) campus are called the Royals. The campus is a member of the National Association of Intercollegiate Athletics (NAIA), primarily competing in the Appalachian Athletic Conference (AAC) since the 2021–22 academic year.

JUTN competes in twelve intercollegiate varsity sports: Men's sports include baseball, basketball, soccer, golf, cross-country, and tennis; while women's sports include basketball, soccer, softball, cross-country, tennis, and volleyball.

== Notable alumni ==
- G. C. Brewer (1884–1956), minister in the Churches of Christ
- Fred Craddock (1928–2015), minister in the Disciples of Christ and Emory University scholar of homiletics
- Oren E. Long (1889–1965), territorial governor of Hawaii and one of Hawaii's first two United States Senators
- Frank Weston Moore (born April 22, 1957), Head Coach North Carolina State University State Women's Basketball.
