= Kimberlin Heights, Tennessee =

Unincorporated community in Knox County, Tennessee

Coordinates: 35°55′50″N 83°45′05″W

Kimberlin Heights is an unincorporated community in southeast Knox County, Tennessee. It is the location of Johnson University and SNMP Research International.

== Postal service ==
Kimberlin Heights was the location of a post office, zip code 37920 and 37998 is Johnson University's zip code.

The Kimberlin Heights post office closed in 2014 following the retirement of the postal worker who managed the unit.

== Education ==
Johnson University is located in Kimberlin Heights.

Public Schools for Kimberlin Heights are managed by Knox County Schools. There are only two schools located in Kimberlin Heights:

- Gap Creek Elementary School – serves grades Kindergarten-4
- New Hopewell Elementary School - serves grades Kindergarten-5

Middle and High Schools students attend South-Doyle Middle School and South-Doyle High School.
