= List of universities and colleges affiliated with the Christian churches and churches of Christ =

A list of universities and colleges affiliated with the Christian churches and churches of Christ, part of the Restoration Movement.

| School | Established | Location |
|---|---|---|
| Abilene Christian University | 1906 | Abilene, Texas |
| Advance School for Ministry Training | 2021 | Kissimmee, Florida |
| Alberta Bible College | 1932 | Calgary, Alberta, Canada |
| Amridge University (formerly Southern Christian University) | 1967 | Montgomery, Alabama |
| Austin Graduate School of Theology | 1975 | Austin, Texas |
| Boise Bible College | 1945 | Boise, Idaho |
| Bushnell University | 1895 | Eugene, Oregon |
| Carolina Christian College | 1945 | Winston-Salem, North Carolina |
| Central Bible University | 1957 | Moberly, Missouri |
| Cincinnati Christian University (defunct) | 1924 | Cincinnati, Ohio |
| Crossroads College | 1913 | Rochester, Minnesota |
| Crowley's Ridge College | 1964 | Paragould, Arkansas |
| Dallas Christian College | 1950 | Farmers Branch, Texas |
| Faulkner University | 1953 | Montgomery, Alabama |
| Florida College | 1946 | Temple Terrace, Florida |
| Freed–Hardeman University | 1869 | Henderson, Tennessee |
| Great Lakes Bible College | 1987 | Waterloo, Ontario |
| Great Lakes Christian College | 1949 | Delta Township, Michigan |
| Harding University | 1924 | Searcy, Arkansas |
| Heritage Christian University | 1971 | Florence, Alabama |
| Hope International University | 1928 | Fullerton, California |
| Jessup University | 1939 | Rocklin, California |
| Johnson University | 1893 | Knoxville, Tennessee |
| Johnson University Florida (defunct) | 1976 | Kissimmee, Florida |
| Kentucky Christian University | 1919 | Grayson, Kentucky |
| Lincoln Christian University (defunct) | 1944 | Lincoln, Illinois |
| Lipscomb University | 1891 | Nashville, Tennessee |
| Louisville Bible College | 1948 | Louisville, Kentucky |
| Lubbock Christian University | 1957 | Lubbock, Texas |
| Manhattan Christian College | 1927 | Manhattan, Kansas |
| Maritime Christian College | 1960 | Charlottetown, Prince Edward Island |
| Mid-Atlantic Christian University | 1948 | Elizabeth City, North Carolina |
| Milligan University | 1866 | Carter County, Tennessee |
| Nations University | 1996 | New Orleans, Louisiana |
| Nebraska Christian College (defunct) | 1945 | Papillion, Nebraska |
| Obong University | 1986 | Obong Ntak, Akwa Ibom State, Nigeria |
| Oklahoma Christian University | 1950 | Edmond, Oklahoma |
| Ozark Christian College | 1942 | Joplin, Missouri |
| Pepperdine University | 1937 | Malibu, California |
| Point University | 1937 | West Point, Georgia |
| St. Louis Christian College | 1955 | Florissant, Missouri |
| Summit Christian College | 1951 | Scottsbluff, Nebraska |
| Summit Theological Seminary | 1984 | Peru, Indiana |
| York University | 1890 | York, Nebraska |
