= Benzinger =

Benzinger is a German language habitational surname for someone from Benzingen in Württemberg. Notable people with the name include:

- Franjo Benzinger (1899–1991), Croatian pharmacist
- J.N. Adelrich Benziger (1837–1878), Swiss businessman, publisher and diplomat
- Joseph Charles Benziger (1762–1841), German founder of RCL Benziger, a Catholic publishing house
- Meinrada Josefa Benziger (1835–1908), German businesswoman, philanthropist
- Todd Benzinger (1963—2026), American former professional baseball first baseman and outfielder
