= GLBC =

GLBC may refer to:

- The stock ticker symbol GBLC, for Global Crossing
- Great Lakes Bible College, a private Christian university in Waterloo, Ontario, Canada
- Great Lakes Christian College (formerly Great Lakes Bible College), a private Christian university in Delta Township, Michigan, United States
- Great Lakes Brewing Company
- Google Local Business Center
