= Central Christian College =

Central Christian College may refer to:

- Central Christian College of Kansas, a private college in McPherson, Kansas
- Central Christian College of the Bible, a private college in Moberly, Missouri
- Oklahoma Christian University, a private college in Oklahoma City, formerly known as Central Christian College
