= SXI =

SXI may refer to:

- Standex International, an American multinational manufacturer of food service equipment, engravings, engineering technologies, electronics and hydraulics
- Solar X-ray Imager, a full-disc X-ray telescope for the Sun
- St. Xavier's Institution, a boys school in Malaysia
- Sirri Island Airport (IATA code: SXI), Iran
- OpenOffice.org XML file format (sxi), used for presentations.
