= Russell Errett =

American politician

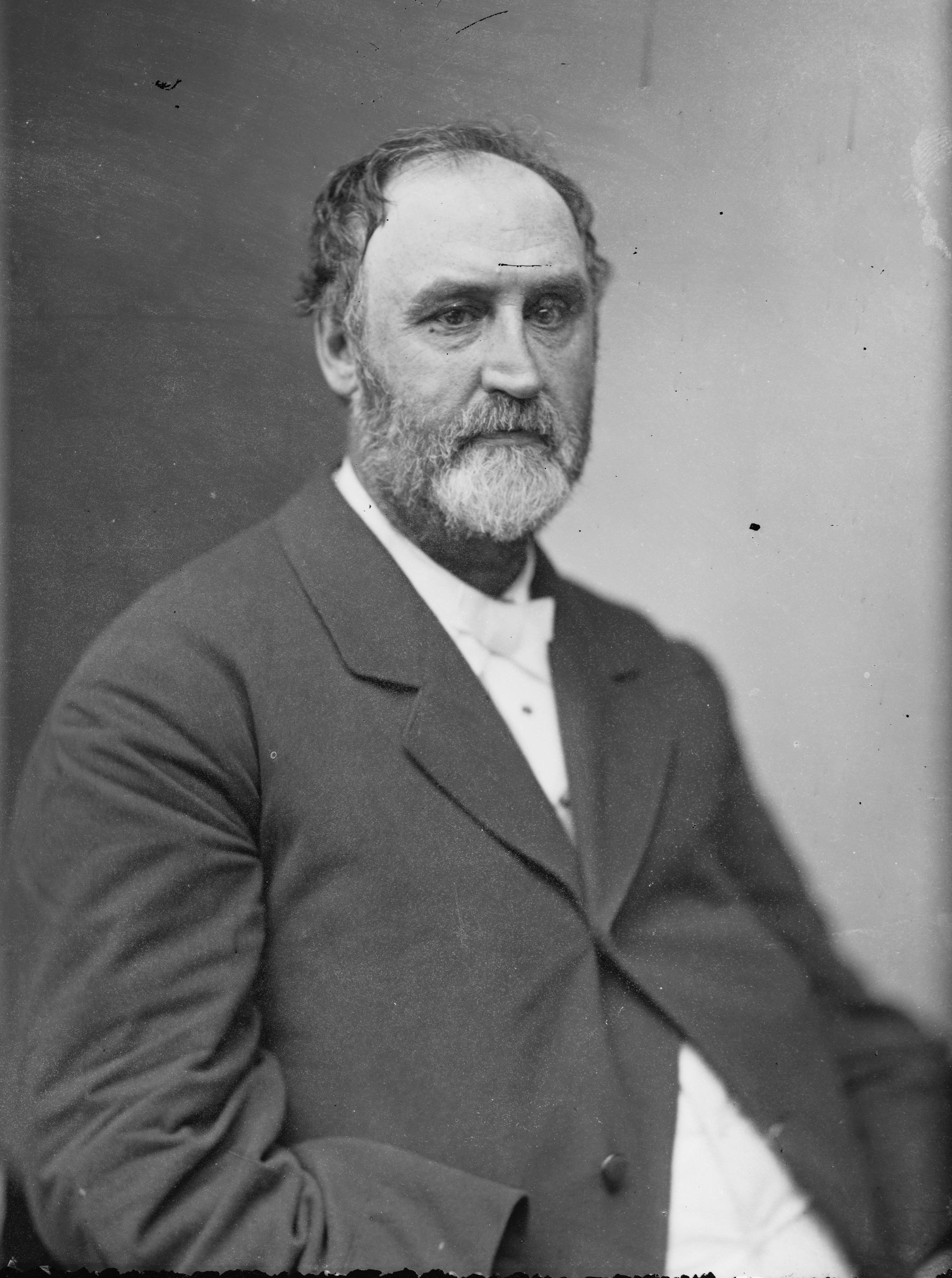

Member of the U.S. House of Representatives from Pennsylvania's 22nd district
- In office March 4, 1877 – March 3, 1883
- Preceded by: James Herron Hopkins
- Succeeded by: James Herron Hopkins

Member of the Pennsylvania Senate
- In office 1867

Personal details
- Born: November 10, 1817 New York City, New York
- Died: April 7, 1891 (aged 73) Carnegie, Pennsylvania
- Party: Republican

Russell Errett (November 10, 1817 – April 7, 1891) was a Republican member of the U.S. House of Representatives from Pennsylvania.

== Biography ==
Russell Errett was born in New York City. In 1829 he moved to Pittsburgh, Pennsylvania, and became engaged in newspaper work. Among the papers he edited were the Pittsburgh Daily Sun, a small penny journal; the Washington Patriot, an anti-slavery weekly of Washington, Pennsylvania; and the Pittsburgh Gazette. He was elected comptroller of Pittsburgh in 1860. He served as clerk of the Pennsylvania State Senate in 1860, 1861, and 1872 to 1876. During the American Civil War, Errett was appointed additional paymaster in the United States Army in 1861 and served until mustered out in 1866. He was a member of the Pennsylvania State Senate in 1867. He was appointed assessor of internal revenue in 1869, and served until 1873. He conducted the Pittsburgh Commercial newspaper from 1873 to 1876.

Errett was elected as a Republican to the 45th, 46th, and 47th Congresses. He served as chairman of the United States House Committee on Expenditures on Public Buildings during the 47th Congress. He was an unsuccessful candidate for reelection in 1882. He was appointed by President Chester A. Arthur as United States pension agent at Pittsburgh in 1883 and served in this capacity until May 1887. He died in Carnegie, Pennsylvania, in 1891. Interment was in Chartiers Cemetery.

Russell's younger brother Isaac Errett was the founding editor of the Christian Standard and a figure in the American Restoration Movement.

U.S. House of Representatives
Preceded by James H. Hopkins	Member of the U.S. House of Representatives from Pennsylvania's 22nd congressional district 1877-1883	Succeeded by James H. Hopkins
