= Lists of universities and colleges =

This is a list of lists of universities and colleges.

== Subject of study ==
- Aerospace engineering
- Agriculture
- Art schools
- Business
- Chiropractic
- Engineering
- Forestry
- Law
- Maritime studies
- Medicine
- Music
- Nanotechnology
- Osteopathy
- Pharmaceuticals
- Social Work

== Institution type ==
- Community colleges
- For-profit universities and colleges
- Land-grant universities
- Liberal arts universities
- National universities
- Postgraduate-only institutions
- Private universities
- Public universities
- Research universities
- Technical universities
- Sea-grant universities
- Space-grant universities
- State universities and colleges
- Unaccredited universities

== Location ==
- Lists of universities and colleges by country
- List of largest universities

== Religious affiliation ==
- Assemblies of God
- Baptist colleges and universities in the United States
- Catholic universities

- Association of Catholic Colleges and Universities
- Ecclesiastical universities
- Benedictine colleges and universities
- Jesuit institutions
- Opus Dei universities
- Pontifical universities
- International Council of Universities of Saint Thomas Aquinas
- International Federation of Catholic Universities

- Christian churches and churches of Christ
- Churches of Christ
- Church of the Nazarene
- Islamic seminaries
- Lutheran colleges and universities
- International Association of Methodist-related Schools, Colleges, and Universities
- Muslim educational institutions
- Association of Presbyterian Colleges and Universities

== Extremities ==
- Endowment
- Largest universities by enrollment
- Oldest madrasahs in continuous operation
- Oldest universities in continuous operation

== Other ==
- Colleges and universities named after people

== History ==
- Medieval universities
- Ancient universities in Britain and Ireland

== See also ==
- Lists of schools
- Distance education
