= Mildred Adair =

American composer, pianist and teacher (1895–1943)

- Adair sometime before February 1928; published by The Etude
- Born: Mildred Grace Adair; August 5, 1895; Clayton, Alabama, US
- Died: April 30, 1943 (aged 47); Miami, Florida
- Occupations: Composer; pianist; teacher
- Works: List of compositions

Mildred Grace Adair (August 5, 1895 – April 30, 1943), later Mildred Grace Adair Stagg, was an American composer, pianist and teacher. Her compositions were mostly for piano solo, although she also wrote vocal and organ works. They were composed primarily as instructional material, while her church music was published for liturgical use.

== Life and career ==
Mildred Grace Adair was born on August 5, 1895, in Clayton, Alabama, US. Her parents were John D. Adair (1869–1897) and Carrie Bennett Adair (1873–1926); Adair's father died two years after her birth. Her childhood was spent in Dothan, Alabama, where she attended local high school and later Judson College, a private women's school in Marion, Alabama.

Adair was a composer, pianist and teacher. From 1910 to 1934, she gave music lessons in Dothan, and later worked as the organist for the city's First Baptist Church. She also chaired Dothan's Harmony Club. Around 1934, Adair married Loring G. Stagg (born 1882), a real estate agent from West Virginia; the couple had three children: a son and two daughters. In 1935, the family moved to Orange County, Florida for one year and lived in Miami form 1938 until her death. Adair died on April 30, 1943, in Miami; she was buried in the Dothan City Cemetery.

Adair's compositions mainly include piano works, although she also wrote art songs and church music. Her piano works were primarily instructional compositions for students, while her sacred music was published for liturgical use. In February 1928, an image of her was included in The Etude music magazine alongside a wide variety of other composers for their "Historical Musical Portrait Series". The Theodore Presser Company published both The Etude and numerous works by Adair.

== List of compositions ==
List of compositions by Mildred Adair
Title	Year	Genre	Publisher	OCLC
A Day's Journey (Note: Described as "Three Episodes for Young Pianists"); Score	1926	Piano	Willis Music Co.	–
A Good Girl: Musical Recitation	1922	?	Theodore Presser	OCLC 498247036
A Heron in Flight	1940	Piano	Theodore Presser	OCLC 1004394890
A Picture of a Fan	1930	Piano	Boston Music Co.	OCLC 1400081726
A Summer Song	1924	2 pianos	Willis Music Co.	OCLC 720144984
All on a Summer's Day	1930	Piano	Hatch Music Co.	OCLC 1400082172
Birds of all Feathers	1936	Orchestral	Theodore Presser	OCLC 1023863855
Boys at Play: For Piano.	1928	Piano	Boston Music Co.	OCLC 498246907
By the Lake	1932	Piano	Boston Music Co.	OCLC 1400080645
Cart-Wheels	1930	Piano	Boston Music Co.	OCLC 1346945704
Cured: Musical Recitation; Score	1922	?	Theodore Presser	OCLC 498246945
Dance of the Daffodils	1934	Piano	Oliver Ditson	OCLC 1374342390
Fairy Kisses	1934	Piano	Oliver Ditson	OCLC 1374342383
Finger Drills (Note: Described as "Eighteen Illustrated Pieces for Bright Pupils to Play and Name")	1929	Piano	Boston Music Co.	–
Five Little Tunes for Little Fingers	?	Piano (left hand)	?	–
From Many Lands (Note: Described as "A Musical Sketch for Chorus, Piano, Violin, Rhythmic Orchestra")	1933	Orchestral	Theodore Presser	OCLC 179236564
Happy and Gay	1926	?	Willis Music Co.	OCLC 498246966
I Feel Like Dancing.	1935	Piano	Theodore Presser	–
In Camp	1931	Piano	Boston Music Co.	OCLC 179299268
In the Candy Shop: Musical Sketch	1925	Piano	Theodore Presser	OCLC 720141066
Indian Warriors	1928	Piano	Shattinger	–
Little Songs for Little Singers	1926	Voice	Standard Publishing	OCLC 13369515
Little Voices Praise Him	1926	Voice	Standard Publishing	–
Melody Pastime (Note: Described as "18 Attractive Study Pieces for Piano")	1930	Piano	Shattinger	–
Melody Pastime	1930	Piano	Shattinger Piano & Music Co.	OCLC 1052844
Mermaids	1927	?	Clayton F. Summy Co.	OCLC 498247053
Merry moods: Seven Pianoforte Duets	1925	Piano	Warren & Phillips	OCLC 730052730
More Songs for Little Singers	1930	Voice	Standard Publishing	OCLC 18654307
Night Song	1931	Piano	Boston Music Co.	–
On the Trestle: Piano Solo	1928	Piano	Boston Music Co.	OCLC 498247081
Pine Trees: A Forest Fantasy	1932	Piano	Carl Fischer Music	OCLC 179298967
Playtime Book for the Pianoforte	1928	Piano	Theodore Presser	OCLC 34129394
Playing Hopscotch	1938	Piano	Theodore Presser	OCLC 1003861384
Playing Soldier	1925	Piano	Theodore Presser	OCLC 655808005
Sea Foam (A Pleasing Glissando Recreation	1925	Piano	Willis Music Co.	OCLC 655862761
Sambo's Defense: Musical Reading	1925	Speech/piano	Eldridge Entertainment House	OCLC 518237894
Song of the Pines	1925	Piano	Theodore Presser	OCLC 1268033248
Song of the Seed	1964?	Voice	Standard Publishing	–
Spanish Moss, a Southern Idyl	1931	Piano	Carl Fischer	OCLC 810613076
Summer Pleasures: Five Pieces	1925	Piano	Theodore Presser	–
Sunset Hour	1930	Piano	Boston Music Co.	OCLC 1346943061
Take Care of Mother for Me; Score	1918	Voice	Frances Cater	OCLC 9950062
The Acrobat	1933	Piano	Boston Music Co.	OCLC 1400084869
The Alligator: A Zoo-Land Episode	1931	Piano	Carl Fischer	OCLC 179292215
The Alligator: a Zoo-Land Episode	1931	Piano	Carl Fischer Music	OCLC 179292215
The Cello: Piano Solo	1929	Piano	Boston Music Co.	OCLC 179298992
Three Happy Piano Pieces	1934	Piano	Oliver Ditson	–
Two Little Dancers	1934	Piano	Theodore Presser	OCLC 52076046
Two Silhouettes: Jumping Jack	1927	Piano	Willis Music Co.	OCLC 498247116
Two Silhouettes: When Evening Shadows Fall; Score	1927	Piano	Willis Music Co	OCLC 498247157
Up Hill and Down	1926	Piano	Willis Music	OCLC 179294770
Vesper Hymn	1925	Piano	Theodore Presser	OCLC 52469029
When the Sun Hangs Low	1926	Piano	Willis Music Co.	OCLC 498247003
With a Dance and a Song	1929	?	Boston Music Co.	OCLC 498247139
Wooden Soldiers on Parade	1934	Piano	Oliver Ditson	OCLC 898310791
