= New Mountain Learning =

- Founded: 2012
- Successor: Carnegie Learning
- Country of origin: United States
- Headquarters location: St. Paul, Minnesota
- Key people: Eric Cantor (Chairman and CEO); Peter Esposito (Group President); Mick Demakos (CDO)
- Publication types: books, magazines
- Imprints: EMC Publishing, Paradigm Publishing, JIST Publishing
- Official website: newmountainlearning.com

New Mountain Learning, LLC was a privately held publishing company founded in 2012 and headquartered in St. Paul, Minnesota. The company published educational textbooks and software, including supplements and assessment tools for PreK-12, post-secondary, workforce development, and religious education fields.

In 2018, New Mountain Learning was acquired by private equity firm CIP Capital from The Wicks Group, who had acquired and merged the New Mountain divisions. Later in 2018, CIP acquired Carnegie Learning and merged New Mountain into Carnegie Learning.

== Corporate organization ==
New Mountain Learning consisted of five divisions:

=== PreK-12 ===
EMC Publishing was founded in 1954, and develops and produces PreK-12 textbook programs in world languages, business education, literature and language arts, and social studies with supplementary and multimedia materials.

=== Post-secondary ===
Paradigm Publishing specializes in post-secondary publishing, offering textbook programs in computer technology, health careers, biotechnology, accounting, business technology, distance learning, and career management with supplementary and multimedia materials.

=== Workforce development ===
JIST Publishing (Job Information, Seeking and Training), has award-winning materials on job-search, career exploration, occupational information, life skills, and character education. Founded by James Michael Farr in 1981 and acquired by EMC in 2007.

=== Applications and programming ===
Lawrenceville Press is a publisher of computer application and programming textbooks. Founded in 1981 and acquired by EMC in 2007.

=== Religious education ===
CFM Publishing, the religious education division of New Mountain Learning consists of two publishers:

- Standard Publishing, a publisher associated with the Christian churches and churches of Christ, founded in 1872 and acquired by Wicks Group in 2006 The majority of Standard Publishing was sold to David C. Cook in 2016; the magazines were sold to The Solomon Foundation in 2017.
- RCL Benziger, originated in Switzerland in 1792 by Joseph Charles Benziger. In July 2007 the Benziger name and product line was purchased from McGraw Hill by CFM Publishing and merged with Texas-based Catholic publisher RCL - Resources For Christian Living (acquired at the same time) to form RCL Benziger. RCL Benziger was sold to Kendall Hunt Publishing in 2016.

== Products ==
Snap (stylized as "SNAP") consists of the following web-based training and assessment learning management software: Keyboarding Online Labs; Snap 2013 (for Microsoft Office 2013) Snap 2010 (for Microsoft Office 2010); Snap 2007 (for Microsoft Office 2007); and Snap 2003 (for Microsoft Office 2003).

EMC Languages is a language program scheduled for release in 2014. According to their website, it is "a dynamic learning environment designed to drive educator effectiveness and student fluency in K-12 and post-secondary world language classrooms." A collaboration with the University of Minnesota, students will use video platforms to demonstrate their skills through assessments and discussions via webcam.

== Users ==
Below is a selection of academic institutions that used New Mountain Learning materials:

- Community College of Philadelphia
- Community College of Rhode Island
- Ivy Tech Community College
- Kaskaskia College
- Kirkwood Community College
- Parkland College
- Schoolcraft College
- Skyline College
- Spencerian College
