= Christian Standard =

American monthly periodical founded in 1866

- Categories: Religion
- Frequency: Monthly
- Founded: 1866
- Company: Restoration Movement Media
- Country: United States
- Based in: Cincinnati, Ohio
- Language: English
- Website: christianstandard.com
- ISSN: 0009-5656

The Christian Standard is a religious periodical associated with the Restoration Movement that was established in 1866. The Standard began focusing on a particular branch of the movement, the Christian churches and churches of Christ, in second half of the 20th century and became the most influential of the movement publications among those churches.

== History ==
The Standard was founded in Cleveland, Ohio, by W.S. Streator, W.J. Ford, J.P. Robinson, T.W. Phillips, C.M. Phillips, G.W.M. Yost, James A. Garfield and Isaac Errett, with Errett serving as the editor. The effort was not financially successful, and after two years Errett agreed to take over the venture along with its debts. It was the flagship of Standard Publishing.

Under the leadership of Errett, who became the first president of the Foreign Christian Missionary Society, the Standard strongly supported the cause of missionary societies.

From 1896-1910, the Standard's editor was J.A. Lord of Deer Island, New Brunswick. During the early 20th century the Standard took an editorial stance against modernism and liberalism, and opposed the acceptance of "open membership" by the United Christian Missionary Society (UCMS). As the century progressed, the Standard focused solely on the Christian churches and churches of Christ and became the most influential of the movement publications among that branch of the Restoration Movement.

Towards the end of the 20th century competition from other forms of media and "the increasing secularization of American culture" has reduced the relative influence of the Standard.

In 2015, Standard Publishing's parent company New Mountain Learning sold its Bible lesson commentary series, Sunday school curriculum and other church resources to David C. Cook. Christian Standard and The Lookout remained and the company was renamed Christian Standard Media. Christian Standard Media was sold to The Solomon Foundation in 2017.
