= Standard Publishing =

Nondenominational Christian publishing company

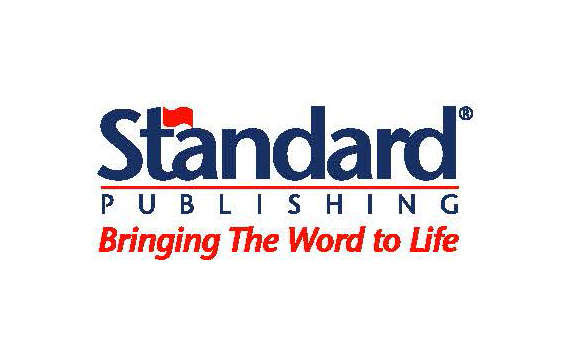
- Parent company: David C. Cook
- Founded: 1872; 154 years ago in Cincinnati, Ohio, U.S.
- Founder: Isaac Errett
- Defunct: 2015
- Successor: Christian Standard Media
- Country of origin: United States
- Headquarters location: Colorado Springs, Colorado, Arlington, Virginia, Cincinnati, Ohio
- Publication types: Books, Magazines, Curricula
- Nonfiction topics: Christian education
- Official website: standardpub.com christianstandardmedia.com

Standard Publishing is a nondenominational Christian publishing company associated with the Restoration Movement. It was founded in Cincinnati, Ohio, in 1872. Major publications have included its flagship journal, Christian Standard, and church education materials including Vacation Bible School curricula.

In 2015, Standard Publishing became an imprint of David C. Cook when the latter acquired the company's Bible lesson commentary series, Sunday school curriculum and other church resources. The company's remaining assets, including Christian Standard, The Lookout, and digital resources for churches, are now produced under the name Christian Standard Media.

== Founding ==
The founding of Standard Publishing parallels the history of the Restoration Movement. Isaac Errett, Herbert Moninger, J. D. Murch, Lillie Faris, Guy P. Leavitt, C. P. Sharp, P. H. Welshimer, W. R. Walker, and Burris Butler were all editors, publishers, and contributors and were all leaders of the Restoration Movement (1790-1825).

== Printing history ==
A two-story building at Ninth and Cutter Streets was purchased in 1914. The Ferro Construction Company erected the company's building at Eighth and Cutter Streets, reported to be the first concrete and steel building put up west of Pittsburgh.

That year the company began to do color printing, which was new at that time. Also established was an engraving division known as the Sterling Engraving Company. In 1945, a new building at Parkway and Jackson Streets, was purchased to house the company's expanded offices. A bookstore opened in 1947.

In 1955, the company moved to a new, air-conditioned plant in Mount Healthy, a northern suburb of Cincinnati.

This single-story plant occupied about seven acres and housed composing, preliminary, printing, binding, and mailing operations. The printing plant included several web as well as large sheetfed presses including a press to apply felt backing to cut-out figures creating flannelgraph sets.

In 1973, the company's printing plant consumed 27,500,000 pounds of paper and more than 400,000 pounds of ink.

The company eventually moved out of the printing business and relocated to its current office complex just north of Cincinnati.

== Publications ==
The company has published Uniform Lessons in a variety of formats since that time. In 1954, this material was presented in an annual bound volume, The Standard Lesson Commentary. It continues today in various editions annually.

The company also published Christian-themed comic books in the period 1942–1947.

Early examples of age-appropriate journals included Sunday School Standard, Boy’s Life, and Girlhood Days. Today all ages of study are represented:

- Standard Lesson — adult Bible study materials for Sunday school, small groups, or personal studies
- Encounter — Sunday school curriculum for junior high and high school teens
- 40 Instant Studies — small group topical Bible studies for teens

For younger children, Standard Publishing publishes:

- HeartShaper — Sunday school curriculum for ages 1 – 12
- 13 Very — series for small group Bible studies ages 3 – 12
- Route 52 — Bible study curriculum for ages 3 – 12
- CAMP — large group event for ages 5 – 12
- Biblical Choices — for Christian school or homeschool bible study, K – 6th grade

Young People’s Standard was created to serve the Christian Endeavor movement for Christian Youth, founded in 1888. Six years later, Young People’s Standard became The Lookout, a weekly Christian magazine for adults, with features to apply their faith and study the Bible, still published weekly today.

The first edition of Training for Service was published in 1911, which in its several updated editions, is used as a Sunday school teacher training text.

In 1913, Standard Publishing became the first publisher of Vacation Bible School (VBS) materials with a five-week, all-day program.

Christian Standard, the journal from which the company took its name, was published every week from 1866 till September 2012, when it introduced a new 64-page monthly edition. In 2014, Christian Standard introduced an app for digital editions available on smartphones and tablets.

== Ownership history ==
After 1872, the Erretts bought Carroll’s share of the company. Standard Publishing continued under the ownership and control of the Errett family until 1955 when it was sold to John Bolten Sr. Under his leadership it became a multinational corporation, eventually known as Standex International.

In July 2006, the Wicks Group, a New York-based private equity firm, acquired Standard Publishing. It was used as an imprint of New Mountain Learning.

In 2007, the company moved to modern offices on the north side of Cincinnati, where the successor company, Christian Standard Media, continues today.

In 2015, David C. Cook acquired the Standard Publishing brand together with the company's Bible lesson commentary series, Sunday school curriculum and other church resources from New Mountain Learning. Christian Standard and The Lookout were not included in the deal and are published by Christian Standard Media.

In 2017, Christian Standard Media was acquired by The Solomon Foundation.

== Sources consulted ==
- Blowers, Paul M.; Dunnavant, Anthony L.; Foster, Douglas A.; Williams, D. Newell, eds. (2004). The Encyclopedia of the Stone-Campbell Movement. Grand Rapids, Michigan: Wm. B. Eerdmans Publishing Co. "Standard Publishing Company," p. 698. "Christian Standard," p. 197. "Butler, Burris (1909-1982), p. 103. "Errett, Isaac," (1820-1888), p. 301. "Lookout, The," p. 487.
- Clark, Brian P. (1998). "An Analysis of the Organizing Functions of the Christian Standard in the Restoration Movement Christian Churches/Churches of Christ". M.A. Thesis. Wheaton College.
- North, James B. (1994). Union in Truth. Cincinnati, Ohio: The Standard Publishing Company. pp. 238–239, 263.
- Small, Ralph M. (July 17, 1988). "Standard Publishing: An Enduring Ministry". The Lookout: 9.
- Wymore, Leonard G. (March 6, 1994). "5,200 Issues—and Still Counting!". The Lookout: 2.
