= Renco Electronics =

American electronics manufacturer

- Industry: electronics
- Headquarters: Rockledge, Florida, US
- Key people: Edward Rensing (President & CEO)
- Products: surface mount inductors, custom chokes, transformers
- Owner: Standex International
- Number of employees: 120
- Website: www.rencousa.com

Renco Electronics is an electronics manufacturer based in Rockledge, Florida. With facilities in the US and China, Renco makes transformers, inductors, chokes and coils.

Renco Electronics, Inc. designs and manufactures transformers and inductors in surface-mount, through-hole and chassis-mount geometries. Renco builds to print, works in conjunction with clients' engineering teams, or provides custom design to client specifications.

More than 1,000 clients buy Renco products.

Renco was founded in 1955 by John A. Rensing in Hicksville, New York, with a loan from his mother-in-law of $2,000. In 1981, the company expanded to a new facility in Deer Park, New York and relocated to its current home of Rockledge, Florida in September 1998. After 56 years in business, Renco is thriving in the US market and now expanding to Hong Kong. John Rensing died in September 2011. After more than 20 years working at Renco, Edward. W. Rensing became the company's CEO and president.

In July 2020, Standex International acquired Renco Electronics for $28 million.
