= Philippine College of Ministry =

Christian college in Baguio, Philippines

Coordinates: 16°26′32″N 120°33′11″E

Philippine College of Ministry (PCM) is a four-year undergraduate Christian Bible college in Baguio, Philippine. It is a non-denominational institution, but is considered to be part of the Stone-Campbell Restoration Movement and is associated with the Christian Churches/Churches of Christ.

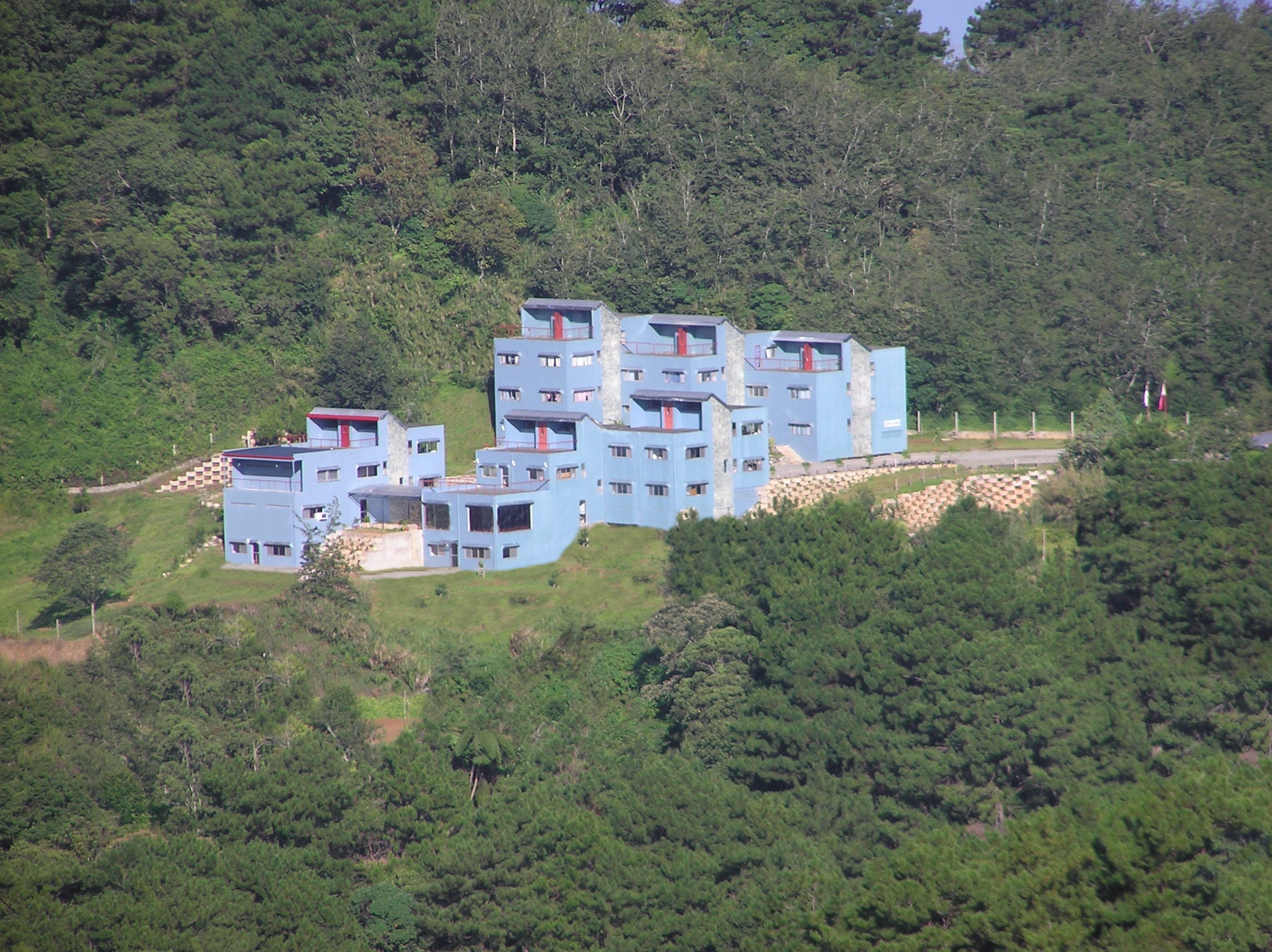
PCM Campus

== History ==
T. Alonzo Street Campus (1992-1995)

In 1991, the Philippine Christian Mission Baguio Team began plans to establish a Bible college in Baguio. The team had discovered that there were insufficient Filipino leaders for the churches being established in the western Cordillera mountains of northern Luzon. The team consisted of Dennis McKinney, Mike Carman, Arnold Pasion, Sol Perillo, Steve Hong, Chris McKinney, and Scott McKinney.

The team invited Samson Lubag, a well-known Filipino leader, to be the first president of the college. The idea of a new college was promoted during the 1991 National Convention of the Churches of Christ in the Philippines. It was decided that the college would focus its efforts on training pastors for ministry in local churches; this led to the name Philippine College of Ministry (PCM).

On June 12, 1992, PCM was opened in a three-story building at 140 T. Alonzo Street, Baguio City. There were 12 students (eight full-time, four part-time). The faculty consisted of Samson Lubag and the five American Missionaries on the team.

In 1993, the college moved to the former Ruff Hause Hotel, about 5km (3 miles) from the center of Baguio.

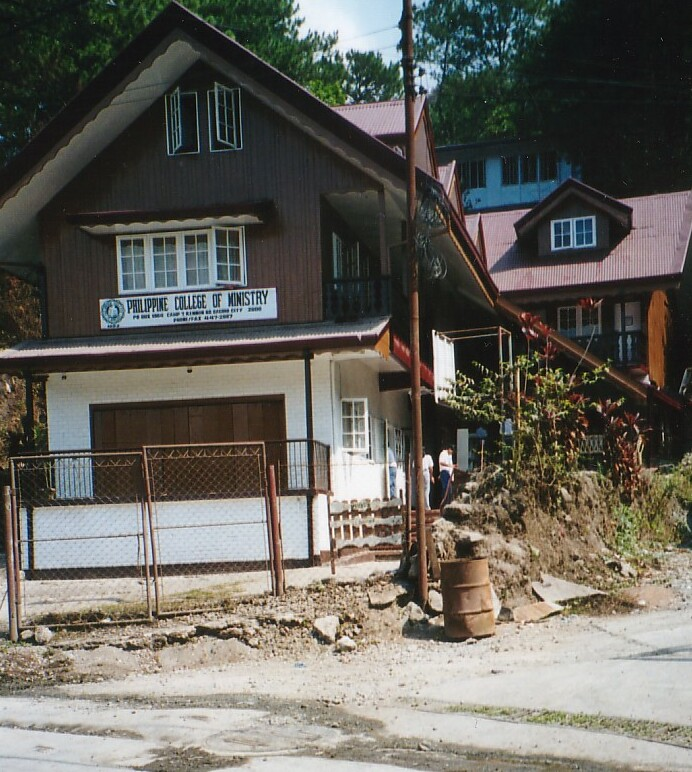
Camp 7 Campus (1995-2005)

In 1997, Dennis McKinney and Samson Lubag invited Dr. James Huckaba and his wife, Linda, to join the college and they arrived in September 1998. Dr. Huckaba began serving as academic dean and professor of Greek and Homiletics. Mrs Huckaba served as PCM business administrator, registrar, and part-time instructor.

Dennis McKinney died on December 21, 1999. His widow Lorrita established the Dennis McKinney Memorial Building Fund with the goal of raising enough money to purchase land for a permanent PCM campus.

In December 2002, PCM purchased 7,500 square meters of land in LamTang, La Trinidad. Groundbreaking took place on September 1, 2004 and teaching on the new campus started on June 13, 2005.

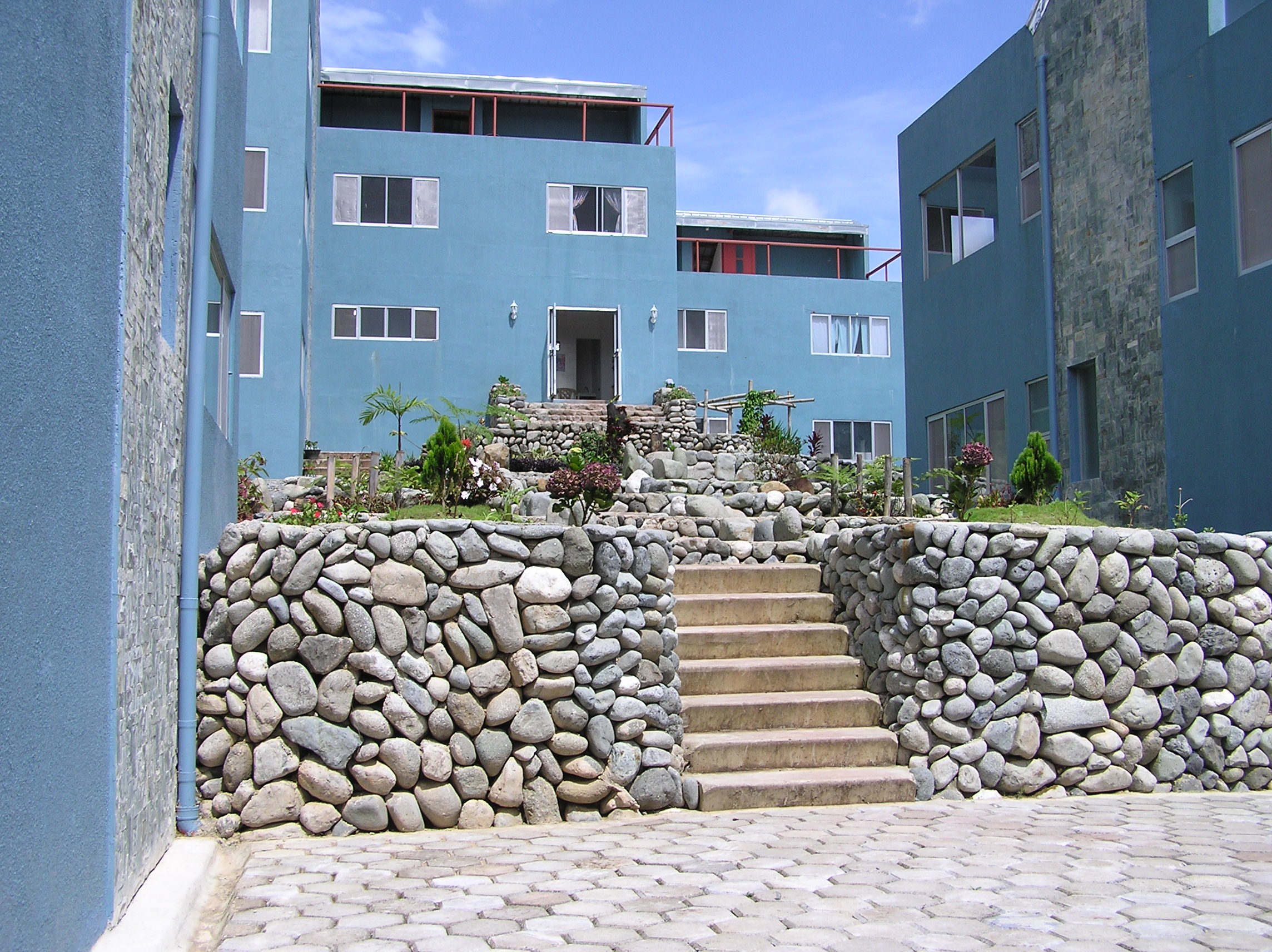
Lamtang Campus

Other significant milestones in the history of Philippine College of Ministry include

- 1994, enrollment of 24;
- October 1998, standardization of degree programs;
- November 1999, registration with the Securities and Exchange Commission (SEC);
- November 1999, recognition as a college by (CHED);
- December 2000, recognition by the Association for Theological Education in South East Asia (ATESEA);

== Degree programs ==
PCM offers the following programs of study:

- The Associate of Theology — a two-year degree program that prepares the student for an associate ministry or for ministry in a rural setting.
- The Bachelor of Theology — a four-year degree program that prepares the student for the ministry on a professional level. The Bachelor of Theology with language requires two years of language, either two years of Hebrew or two years of Greek or one year each of Greek and Hebrew.

== Affiliations ==
PCM is a member of the Philippine Council of Evangelical Churches (PCEC) and the Philippine Association of Bible and Theological Schools (PABATS).
