= J. N. Adelrich Benziger =

Swiss businessman, publisher and diplomat

Consul J.N. Adelrich Benziger
- Benziger, c. 1870

Consul General of Switzerland to Cincinnati, Ohio
- In office 1864–1866
- President: Jakob Dubs

Personal details
- Born: Joseph Nicholas Adelrich Benziger; September 14, 1837; Einsiedeln, Switzerland
- Died: February 17, 1878 (aged 40); Staten Island, New York, U.S.
- Resting place: Saint Peter's Cemetery
- Spouse: Bertha von Sarnthein (m. 1869)
- Relations: Molly Brown (mother of daughter-in-law)
- Occupation: Businessman, publisher, diplomat

Joseph Nicholas Adelrich Benziger abbreviated as J.N. Adelrich Benziger (14 September 1837 – 17 February 1878) was a Swiss businessman, publisher and diplomat who served as Consul General of Switzerland to Cincinnati, Ohio from 1864 to 1866. Benziger led the U.S. subsidiaries of RCL Benziger from 1857.

His son George Benziger would ultimately marry Helen Brown, who was a daughter of Molly Brown. Benziger permanently moved to Staten Island, New York in 1873, where he suddenly died in 1878 aged only 40.

== Early life and education ==
Benziger was born 14 September 1837, in Einsiedeln, Switzerland, the ninth child born to Karl Benziger and Anna Maria (née Meyer), originally from Oberägeri. His father was born in Feldkirch, Austria after fleeing French troops. Karl was a member of the Executive Council of Schwyz and part-owner of Benziger Publishers. His older sister Meinrada Josefa Benziger was also involved in the family business. His family belonged to the upper-middle class. Initially, he was taught by a private teacher and then attended secondary schools in St. Gallen and Einsiedeln, as well as boarding schools in Bern and Geneva. After his compulsory schooling he completed an apprenticeship as a book merchant in Augsburg (Kingdom of Bavaria) and an internship at the Lampert bookshop.

== Career ==
In 1856, aged 19, he entered the family business and a year later he took over the business interests of his cousin, also Adelrich Benziger, in the United States. In 1860, Benziger Brothers acquired the Catholic publishing company Kreuzberg & Nurre and established another branch in Cincinnati, Ohio. Between 1864 and 1866, Benziger served as the consul general of Switzerland in Cincinnati.

== Personal life ==
Benziger married Gräfin Bertha von Sarnthein, a noble woman of Innsbruck, Austria, in 1869. They were introduced by his sister, Felicitas Benziger, who attended school with her. They had two daughters and three sons;

- Anna Benziger (b. 1870)
- Felicitas Benziger (b. 1872)
- Bernard Adelrich Benziger (b. 1876)
- George Joseph Peter Adelheid Benziger (1877–1948), married Catherine Ellen 'Helen' Brown (1889–1970), daughter of James Joseph Brown and Margaret Brown (née Tobin); two sons: James George Adelrich Benziger (1914–1995) and George Peter Joseph Benziger (1917–1985).
