= St. Louis Christian College =

Bible college in Missouri

- Type: Private bible college
- Active: 1956–2022 (merged with Central Christian College of the Bible)
- Religious affiliation: Christian churches and churches of Christ
- President: Terry E. Stine
- Faculty: 50 (including staff)
- Undergraduates: 153
- Location: Florissant, Missouri, United States; 38.775574°N 90.294721°W
- Campus: 11.5 acres (4.65 ha)
- Website: stlchristian.edu

St. Louis Christian College was a private Bible college in Florissant, Missouri. It was theologically and ecclesiastically associated with the Restoration Movement of Christian Churches and Churches of Christ. It was accredited by the Association for Biblical Higher Education.

In August 2021, the trustees of Central Christian College of the Bible and Saint Louis Christian College approved a merger of their institutions, which was completed with the approval and assistance of The Solomon Foundation, the owner of both campuses. The Missouri Secretary of State accepted the merger agreement on December 5, 2022.
