= Nebraska Christian College =

Private College in Papillion, Nebraska

Coordinates: 41°07′19″N 96°05′37″W

- Motto: Creating Church Leaders
- Type: Private, non-profit
- Active: 1945–2020
- Religious affiliation: Christian churches and churches of Christ
- Students: 85
- Location: 12550 S 144th St. Papillion address, Nebraska, United States
- Campus: Suburban
- Mascot: Sentinels (Papillon campus) Parsons (Norfolk campus)
- Website: Official website

Nebraska Christian College was a Christian baccalaureate college in unincorporated Sarpy County, Nebraska, with a Papillion address. Its stated goal was to offer a Bible-based education to prepare people for service and ministry.

== History ==
In October 1944, fifteen people met in Wymore, Nebraska to discuss establishing a Bible college for northeastern Nebraska. Norfolk, Nebraska was chosen as the site in order to leverage the existing Norfolk Junior College for general education classes. The goal was to teach and train young people to serve Christian churches.

In August 2006, Nebraska Christian College students began attending their first classes on the new Papillion campus near Omaha. Nebraska Christian College had raised money over several years to move the campus to the Omaha metro.

It was a member of the Association for Biblical Higher Education.

In 2016, the college completed a merger with Hope International University that gave students access to online courses as well as additional degree options. The merger was led by Hope International University president John Derry.

On April 2, 2020 HIU President Paul Alexander announced via a video that the college would close the next month. The remaining students were transferred to HIU's home campus, or permitted to continue their studies online. The announcement cited a shrinking student body, economic conditions, and financial difficulties dating back to before the 2016 merger.
