= James Herron Hopkins =

American politician

James H. Hopkins
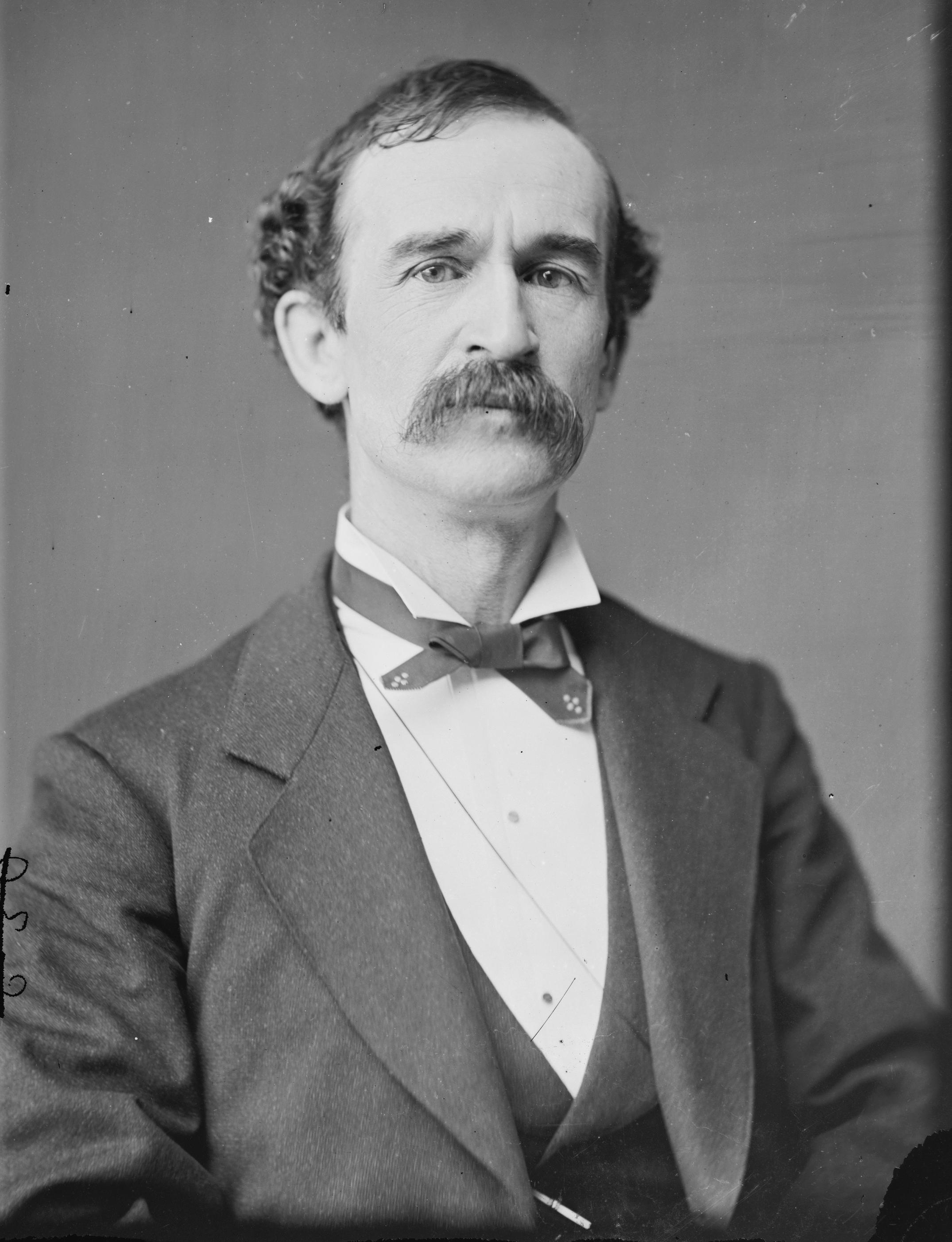

Member of the U.S. House of Representatives from Pennsylvania's 22nd district
- In office March 4, 1883 – March 3, 1885
- Preceded by: Russell Errett
- Succeeded by: James S. Negley
- In office March 4, 1875 – March 3, 1877
- Preceded by: James S. Negley
- Succeeded by: Russell Errett

Personal details
- Born: November 3, 1831 Washington, Pennsylvania, U.S.
- Died: June 17, 1904 (aged 72) North Hatley, Quebec, Canada
- Resting place: Oak Hill Cemetery; Washington, D.C., U.S.
- Party: Democratic
- Education: Washington College

James Herron Hopkins (November 3, 1831 – June 17, 1904) was a Democratic member of the U.S. House of Representatives representing the Pittsburgh area in Pennsylvania.

== Education and career ==
Hopkins was born in Washington, Pennsylvania. He attended the common schools and was graduated from Washington College (now Washington and Jefferson College) in Washington in 1850. He studied law, was admitted to the bar in 1852 and practiced in Pittsburgh, Pennsylvania, for twenty years. He was also engaged in banking, manufacturing, and mining. For several years he served as vice president of the Pittsburgh chamber of commerce.

Hopkins was an unsuccessful candidate for election in 1872. He was elected as a Democrat to the Forty-fourth Congress. He was an unsuccessful candidate for reelection in 1876. He was again elected to the Forty-eighth Congress. He served as the chairman of the United States House Committee on Labor during the Forty-eighth Congress. He was an unsuccessful candidate for reelection in 1884.

== Interstate commerce ==
He introduced the first (successful) bill implementing federal regulations on interstate commerce in 1872. Originally a supporter of such centralized power the oil lobby led by Standard Oil unsuccessfully fought the measure. Muckraker Ida Tarbell cites Hopkins in many of her works and speeches.

== Retirement ==
After his time in Congress, he engaged in the practice of law in Washington, D.C. He died at his summer home at North Hatley, Quebec, Canada, in 1904. He was buried at Oak Hill Cemetery in Washington, D.C.

== Sources ==
- United States Congress. "James Herron Hopkins (id: H000775)". Biographical Directory of the United States Congress.
- The Political Graveyard

U.S. House of Representatives
Preceded by James S. Negley	Member of the U.S. House of Representatives from Pennsylvania's 22nd congressional district 1875 - 1877	Succeeded by Russell Errett
Preceded by Russell Errett	Member of the U.S. House of Representatives from Pennsylvania's 22nd congressional district 1883 - 1885	Succeeded by James S. Negley
