= Bakers Pride =

American commercial appliance manufacturer

- Product type: Commercial ovens
- Current owner: Middleby Corporation
- Country: United States
- Introduced: 1945; 81 years ago
- Website: www.bakerspride.com

Bakers Pride Oven Company is an American manufacturer of commercial baking, cooking and broiling equipment. The brand was founded in 1945 in The Bronx, New York. Bakers Pride works in partnership with foodservice dealers and awards dealerships who maintain a commercial showroom, engineering department, or warehouse.

== History ==
Bakers Pride was founded in 1945 and began offering the Y-602 Double Pizza Oven. Many New York pizzerias purchased this oven for creating chef quality pizza. Some original models are still in operation. The brand offers a full line of deck ovens and gas counter top ovens such as the VH-1828 series. The GC182 oven features two separate 18 inch conveyors.

Chef Jeff Pond of A4 Pizza stated he always used Bakers Pride ovens which, along with Blodgett and Marsal & Sons, are the most popular pizza ovens in the New York region. The company also offers electric ovens which can produce up to four pies in 15 minutes.

== Acquisition ==
The brand was a subsidiary of Standex International. It was acquired by Middleby Corporation in 2019.
