= International Christian College of Manila =

Christian college in Rizal, Philippines

Coordinates: 14°34′50″N 121°10′55″E

International Christian College of Manila (ICCM) is a private, non-profit co-educational Bible college of the non-denominational Christian Churches/Churches of Christ as rooted on the Stone-Campbell Restoration Movement, whose existence is anchored, among others, on the preservation of primitive New Testament Christianity. Its main campus is in San Jose, Antipolo, province of Rizal, Philippines.

In accordance with the Philippine law, ICCM first received its permit to operate from the country’s Commission on Higher Education (CHED) on 8 March 2005.

== History ==
The college started in July 2000 when a number of advanced students of theology from other Bible seminaries found that they no longer had a Bible college in which to study. The students approached church ministers of Metro Manila like Nick Alfafara, Robert and Nezie Cabalteja, and Ross and Cheryl Wissmann for help with a new college where they could continue their training for the church.

The first classes were held in the Wissmann’s residence then in Mapayapa Village I, Quezon City. The first professors were Bobby and Nezie Cabalteja, Tito Pel, Ferdinand Rosete, and Ross and Cheryl Wissmann. By August 2000, premises were rented in Village Plaza Building at the corner of Narra and Sampaguita streets at Mapayapa Village III that served as boys’ dorm and classrooms while the girls’ dormitory was at the nearby Bueno Sol, Ramax Subdivision, Quezon City.

The same year, the Board of Trustees was created to act as a policy-making body and to oversee the school’s operation, fund-raising drives and promotion. Its first chair and vice-chair were Dr. Violeta N. Arciaga and Dr. Josue S. Falla, respectively, both well-known educators and scientists in the Philippine civil service. The school was registered with the Securities and Exchange Commission on 21 June 2001.

In 2002, when Village Plaza was repossessed by a bank, the college moved to its present location at the corner of Provincial Road and Genesis streets in Antipolo, province of Rizal. The site had been a resort, a private school, and then left derelict. Antipolo Church of Christ had been meeting there and is accommodated for their services each Sunday. The property is 5,000 square meters and a lease has been obtained for at least ten years.

ICCM began with 11 students but this had declined to six by end of the first semester. Enrollment grew to 27 at the beginning of second term 2000/01 and to 66 for the first semester 2001/2002. The enrollment for second semester 2003/4 was 84 and the first semester of 2006/7 it escalated to 125 students.

== Undergraduate program ==
ICCM offers a four-year Bachelor of Arts in Theology program that aims to build strong Biblical foundation of faith. It has four major areas to choose from: Ministry, Education, Outreach, and Worship/Music.

== Faculty ==
ICCM faculty members are from Christian churches and seminaries abroad, mostly from the US, Australia, the United Kingdom, Brazil, Mexico, Papua New Guinea, Pakistan and India. Some are authors of Christian books and commentaries. Each of them has either an earned doctoral degree or expertise in their respective disciplines.

== Academic scholarship ==
A grant for academic scholarship is available to those students who excel in academics and exemplify good moral character.

== Working student program ==
Students are assigned to work alongside the staff inside the campus. Life skills are being developed among students under the work program. Work is available in places like the library, kitchen, canteen, ground and building. Working students are provided with remuneration to defray partially or totally the cost of their studies at ICCM.

== Facilities ==
New building work has been done to remodel existing buildings for the library, computer laboratory, chapel, four classrooms, dining hall, faculty and staff housing, and other facilities. Now, these facilities can conveniently accommodate over 100 students.

As a boarding school, students are generally obliged to live in campus dormitories managed by dorm managers.
