= Meinrada Josefa Benziger =

Swiss businesswoman, publisher and philanthropist (1835–1908)

- Born: 22 January 1835; Einsiedeln, Switzerland
- Died: 29 November 1908 (aged 73); Einsiedeln, Switzerland
- Occupations: Businesswoman, publisher, philanthropist

Meinrada Josefa Benziger (22 January 1835 – 29 November 1908) was a Swiss businesswoman, publisher and philanthropist who managed a portion of the Benziger publishing house in Einsiedeln, Switzerland.

== Early life and education ==
Meinrada Josefa Benziger was the seventh child of Karl Benziger and Anna Maria Meyer born in Einsiedeln, Switzerland. Her father was a politician and bookseller and, together with his brother Nikolaus Benziger, was a co-owner of the Benziger Verlag publishing house in Einsiedeln. After finishing her studies at Einsiedeln village schools, Meinrada received private education at home. From 1851 to 1853 she attended the boarding school of the Catholic female congregation of the Faithful Companions of Jesus in Carouge.

== Personal life ==
In 1854, she married her first cousin, Nikolaus Benziger; they both belonged to "a cantonal elite." Nikolaus later served on the National Council and the Cantonal Council and the marriage kept the Benziger fortune intact. Altogether, her husband, three brothers Josef Karl Benziger, Martin Benziger and Joseph Nicholas Adelrich Benziger and two brothers-in-law worked with her in the family publishing house. Meinrada and Nikolaus had six children and, in time, their three sons joined them by working there.

== Career ==
In the family business, Meinrada initially took on the accounting duties. Then, for almost 40 years, she managed the trade in Catholic devotional objects, an activity traditionally left in female hands at the family business, Benziger Verlag (a branch is now called RCL Benziger). She was also responsible for the production of rosaries, made by home workers called "Kettlerinnen." She worked with her husband on several business trips to Germany and France as the company expanded its range to Europe and the United States.

Because of her husband's political positions, Benziger was called Mrs. National Councillor and later Mrs. Council of States by her contemporaries. She was also a benefactor of the poor. For more than 50 years, her philanthropy made her the leading figure in the local women's association, founded in 1846 by her older sister Katharina Steinauer-Benziger. Their organization, of which Meinrada was president from 1882, developed intense activities to aid the poor, care for the sick, train teachers and help women who could promote regional crafts and weave straw in Einsiedeln in the early 1850s.

She maintained extensive correspondence with family members and became a solid anchor in sometimes tense family relations. In 1886 and 1891 she traveled to the United States, where two of her sons and other relatives had set up subsidiaries of the publishing house in New York City and Cincinnati, Ohio.

She died in Einsiedeln on 29 November 1908, a few days after the death of her husband.
