= Christian Missionary Fellowship International =

Christian organization

- Founded: 1949
- Founder: O.D. "Pat" Johnson
- Type: 501(c)(3) religious non-profit corporation under the laws of the State of Indiana, US.
- Purpose: Transforming lives and communities
- Location: Indianapolis, Indiana, US, 5525 E. 82nd Street (Mission Service Center)
- Region served: 27 countries
- Method: Transformational impact through church planting, serving the urban poor, international campus ministry, international development, and marketplace ministry.
- Key people: Dr. Kevin (Kip) Lines (Executive Director)
- Website: www.cmfi.org

Christian Missionary Fellowship International (CMFI or CMF International) is a non-denominational, non-profit, Christian organization that sends out missionaries and partners with Christian ministries around the globe. Based in Indianapolis, CMF has missionaries and ministry partners in more than 25 countries. The purpose of CMFI is to transform lives and communities through church planting, serving the urban poor, international campus ministry, international development, and marketplace ministry.

== History ==
CMFI began in 1946 after Christian missionary O.D. "Pat" Johnson traveled to India. During his time there he began to brainstorm different ideas for missionary relations with the countries and communities in which missionaries are stationed. When he arrived back in America, Johnson contacted Christian leaders around the nation to come up with different strategies for the mission's work. In 1949 CMFI was founded at Manhattan Bible College in Kansas. During the course of its first year, CMFI sent missionary families into India. During the 1960s CMFI expanded and teams of missionaries began to penetrate countries like Ethiopia and Brazil. In the 1970s and 1980s CMFI had missionaries operating in Kenya, Mexico, Tanzania, Chile, and England. By the next decade teams were also working in Singapore, Benin, Thailand, Ukraine, and the Ivory Coast as were intercultural groups within the United States.

There is a CMFI presence in 23 countries and around 183 missionaries are in the field.

== Programs ==
=== Reach ===
Reach is a summer internship program designed by CMFI for college-age students who want to experience missions work over a period of 2–3 months.

=== CHE ===
Community Health and Evangelism (CHE) is a program that CMFI uses in poor urban and village communities to combine public health improvements and evangelism work. The program is designed to teach members of poor communities about the gospel and about basic sanitation and health promotion.

=== Globalscope ===
Along with Reach, CMFI has a program for international college campuses called Globalscope. The main purpose of Globalscope is to provide a campus ministry for college students to come to for bible studies and discipleship. Globalscope ministries operate in Brisbane, Montevideo, Santiago, Puebla, Bangkok, Salamanca, Birmingham, Edinburgh, Erlangen, Viña del Mar, València, Nottingham, Maastricht, and Tübingen.

=== Bi-vocational Ministry ===
CMFI's Bi-vocational Ministry is specifically for sending missionaries with other vocations into countries that do not allow Christian missionaries to obtain visas. People who serve with the Bi-vocational Ministry have a traditional occupation or set of skills and the ability to act as a full-time missionary.

=== Microfinancing ===
Because of the poor economic conditions of many of the countries in which CMFI works, it also provides information on microfinance to the communities it serves. An example of this kind of ministry is with Hope International, with which CMFI partners. Usually a group from a poor or impoverished community will receive training in basic trades, bookkeeping and marketing. Each new business will receive a small loan to get it off the ground. Microfinancing plays a large role in CHE.

=== AIDS/HIV crisis ===
Because of the growing number of those afflicted with AIDS, CMFI, using the Community Health and Evangelism program, tries to raise awareness about this epidemic. The CHE program educates communities on how AIDS/HIV spreads and advocates abstinence as a prevention method. CMFI provides care for families who are suffering from this disease.
