= Christian churches and churches of Christ =

Protestant denominations

Independent "Christian Churches" and "Churches of Christ"
- Classification: Protestant
- Orientation: Restorationist
- Polity: Congregationalist
- Associations: World Convention of Churches of Christ
- Founder: Barton Stone; Thomas Campbell; Alexander Campbell; Walter Scott
- Origin: 1804–Last Will and Testament; 1809–Declaration and Address; 1832–Union in Lexington; 1927–North American Christian Convention; 1971–Withdrawal from Year Book
- Separations: Churches of Christ (1906); Christian Church (Disciples of Christ) (1926–1971)
- Members: 1,379,041 in the United States

The group of churches known as the Christian Churches and Churches of Christ, or Independent Christian Churches, is a fellowship of congregations within the 19th-century Stone-Campbell Restoration Movement that have no formal denominational affiliation with other congregations, but still share many characteristics of belief and worship. Churches in this tradition are strongly congregationalist and have no formal denominational ties, and thus there is no proper name that is agreed upon and applied to the movement as a whole. Most (but not all) congregations in this tradition include the words "Christian Church" or "Church of Christ" in their congregational name. Due to the lack of formal organization between congregations, there is a lack of official statistical data, but the 2016 Directory of the Ministry documents some 5000 congregations in the US and Canada; some estimate the number to be over 6,000 since this directory is unofficial. By 1988, the movement had 1,071,616 members in the United States.

In 2010, the movement had grown to 1,453,160 members within 5,293 churches in the US. By 2020, the movement had declined to 1,379,041 members in the United States in 4,787 churches.

These congregations share historical roots with other, similarly named congregations within the Restoration Movement, including congregations organized within formal fellowships, such as the "Christian Church (Disciples of Christ)" or the "Churches of Christ". The congregations discussed in this article, however, have chosen to remain fully autonomous. Further distinguishing these congregations is their use of instrumental music within their worship, unlike the "Churches of Christ" who do not use instrumental music. The instrumental congregations discussed here and the a cappella "Churches of Christ" are otherwise very similar but have little contact with each other in most communities, although there is some cooperation among some larger churches and also in some educational institutions.

== Congregational nomenclature ==
The churches are independent congregations and typically go by the name "Christian Church", but often use the name "Church of Christ" as well. Though isolated exceptions may occur, it is generally agreed within the movement that no personal or family names should be attached to a congregation which Christ purchased and established with his own blood, though geographical labels are acceptable. Thus, it is common for a congregation to be known as "[City Name] Christian Church," but in some areas they may be known as "[The/First] Christian Church [of/at] [City, Community, or Other Location Name]." In recent history, individual congregations have made the decision to change their formal name to break with traditional nomenclature and to adopt more generic names like "Christ's Church [of/at] [City Name]", "[City Name] Community Christian Church", or "[City Name] Community Fellowship". The tendency in Restoration churches to choose names such as "Christian Church" and "Church of Christ" can cause difficulties in identifying the affiliation (if any) of an individual church based solely on its name. Furthermore, it is not uncommon for churches outside of the Restoration Movement to use similar names (see Church of Christ (disambiguation)).

== Separation from the Disciples of Christ ==
The separation of the independent Christian churches and churches of Christ from the Christian Church (Disciples of Christ) (DoC) occurred over an extended period of time. The roots of the separation date back to a polarization that occurred during the early twentieth century as the result of three significant controversies. These controversies surrounded theological modernism, the impact of the ecumenical movement, and open membership (recognizing as full members individuals who had not been baptized by immersion).

The Disciples of Christ were, in 1910, a united, growing community with common goals. Support by the United Christian Missionary Society of missionaries who advocated open membership became a source of contention in 1920. Efforts to recall support for these missionaries failed in a 1925 convention in Oklahoma City and a 1926 convention in Memphis, Tennessee. Many congregations withdrew from the missionary society as a result.

A new convention, the North American Christian Convention (NACC), was organized by the more conservative congregations in 1927. An existing brotherhood journal, the Christian Standard, also served as a source of cohesion for these congregations. From the 1960s on, newer unaffiliated missionary organizations like the Christian Missionary Fellowship (today, Christian Missionary Fellowship International) were working more on a national scale to rally Christian Church/Church of Christ congregations in international missions. By this time the division between liberals and conservatives was well established.

The official separation between the independent Christian Churches/Churches of Christ and the Christian Church (Disciples of Christ) is difficult to date. Suggestions range from 1926 to 1971 based on the events outlined below:

- 1926: The first NACC in 1927 was the result of disillusionment at the DoC Memphis Convention.
- 1944: International Convention of Disciples elects as president a proponent of open membership.
- 1948: The Commission on Restudy, appointed to help avoid a split, disbands.
- 1955: The Directory of the Ministry was first published listing only the "Independents" on a voluntary basis.
- 1968: Final redaction of the Disciples Year Book removing Independent churches
- 1971: Independent churches listed separately in the Yearbook of American Churches.

== Identity ==
Because the Christian churches and churches of Christ are independent congregations there is no set creed, but The Directory of the Ministry contains the following general description:

Members of Christian Churches and churches of Christ believe in the deity and Lordship of Jesus Christ, the inspiration of the Bible, and the autonomy of local congregations. Following the basic principles of the 'Restoration Movement', they accept and teach believers' baptism by immersion into Christ for the forgiveness of sins; they assemble for worship on the first day of the week, also following Biblical example or inference regarding observance of the Lord's Supper part of worship. Worship also includes congregational a cappella singing of hymns, prayer, free-will monetary contribution (from the local congregation's members) as well as preaching of the Gospel, frequently in concert with other applicable Bible-based topics. They seek the unity of all believers on the basis of faith in and obedience to Christ as the divine Son of God and the acceptance of the Bible particularly the New Testament as their all-sufficient rule of faith and practice.

== Baptism ==
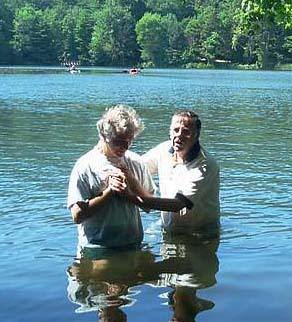
Baptism by immersion

Of the principles cited above, one characteristic marks most Christian Churches and Churches of Christ as distinctly different from other modern Evangelical Christian groups. That is the teaching that a person receives the remission of sins at the point of his or her baptism.

== Educational institutions ==
The Christian Churches/churches of Christ support a variety of Bible colleges and seminaries. Because there is no official "denominational" structure in the movement, the local colleges often serve as information centers and allow the local churches to maintain connections with each other.

=== Canada ===
Colleges and seminaries	Location	Date founded
Alberta Bible College	Calgary, Alberta	1932
Great Lakes Bible College	Waterloo, Ontario	1952
Maritime Christian College	Charlottetown, Prince Edward Island	1960

=== India ===
Colleges and seminaries	Location	Date founded
India Christian Bible College	Kerala, South India	1980

=== Philippines ===
Colleges and seminaries	Location	Date founded
Cebu Bible Seminary	Zone 2, Canton Ville, San Isidro, Talisay City, Cebu	1947
The Good Master Christian College	Lambac, Pagsanjan, Laguna	20**
Philippine Bible Seminary	Nagsangalan, Vigan City, Ilocos Sur	1958
Aparri Bible Seminary	Diego Silang St., Maura, Aparri, Cagayan	1952
NorthEastern Seminary	Jurisdiction Lal-lo, Cagayan	2023
Daet School of Ministy	Daet, Camasines Norte	
Mindanao Christian Foundation College and Seminary, Inc.(Davao Bible Seminary)	KM.10, Catalunan Pequeno, Davao City	1956 - Defunct
Northern Institute of Christian Education	Ilagan City, Isabela, Philippines	2023
International Christian College of Manila	San Jose, Antipolo City, Rizal, Philippines	2005
Manila Bible Seminary	Novaliches, Quezon City, Philippines	1926
Philippine College of Ministry	Lamtang, La Trinidad, Benguet, Philippines	1991

=== United States ===
Colleges and seminaries	Location	Date founded
Boise Bible College	Boise, Idaho	1945
Blueridge College of Evangelism	Wytheville, Virginia	1971
Bushnell University (formerly Northwest Christian University)	Eugene, Oregon	1895
Central Bible University	Moberly, Missouri	1957
Colegio Biblico	Eagle Pass, Texas	1945
Crossroads College	Rochester, Minnesota	1913
Dallas Christian College	Dallas, Texas	1950
Emmanuel Christian Seminary	Johnson City, Tennessee	1965
Great Lakes Christian College	Delta Township, Michigan	1949
Hope International University (formerly Pacific Christian College)	Fullerton, California	1928
Johnson University	Knoxville, Tennessee	1893
Johnson University Florida (formerly Florida Christian College)	Kissimmee, Florida	1976
Kentucky Christian University	Grayson, Kentucky	1919
Lincoln Christian University	Lincoln, Illinois	1944
Louisville Bible College	Louisville, Kentucky	1948
Manhattan Christian College	Manhattan, Kansas	1927
Mid-Atlantic Christian University	Elizabeth City, North Carolina	1948
Mid-South Christian College	Memphis, Tennessee	1959
Milligan University	Milligan College, Tennessee	1866
Northwest College of the Bible	Portland, Oregon	1950
Ozark Christian College	Joplin, Missouri	1942
Point University	East Point and West Point, Georgia	1937
Saint Louis Christian College	Florissant, Missouri	1956
Summit Christian College	Gering, Nebraska	1951
Summit Theological Seminary	Peru, Indiana	1974
William Jessup University (formerly San Jose Christian College)	Rocklin, California	1939

=== Defunct schools ===
- Puget Sound Christian College, opened in 1950 but closed in 2007.
- Cincinnati Christian University, opened in 1924 but closed in 2019.
- In October 2023, Lincoln Christian University announced that it would close on May 31, 2024.

== Creeds and slogans ==
A number of creeds and slogans have been used in the Restoration Movement to express some of the distinctive themes of the Movement. These include:

- "Where the Scriptures speak, we speak; where the Scriptures are silent, we are silent."
- "The church of Jesus Christ on earth is essentially, intentionally, and constitutionally one."
- "We are Christians only, but not the only Christians."
- "In essentials, unity; in opinions, liberty; in all things love."
- "No creed but Christ, no book but the Bible, no law but love, no name but the divine."
- "Call Bible things by Bible names."

== See also ==
- Christianity
- Christian Church
- Restoration Movement
- Churches of Christ
- Christian Church (Disciples of Christ)
- Christian primitivism
- Sponsoring church (Churches of Christ)
- Churches of Christ (non-institutional)
- Campbellite
