= Alberta Bible College =

Bible college in Calgary, Canada

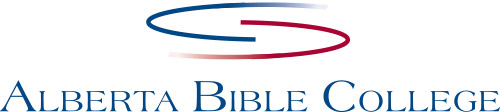
- Type: Private
- Religious affiliation: Non-denominational
- Academic affiliations: Association for Biblical Higher Education, Christian Churches and Churches of Christ, Disciples of Christ, Churches of Christ
- President: Stanley Neal Helton, DMin, PhD
- Location: 635 Northmount Drive NW; Calgary, Alberta, Canada; 51.0856°N 114.0894°W
- Website: www.abccampus.ca
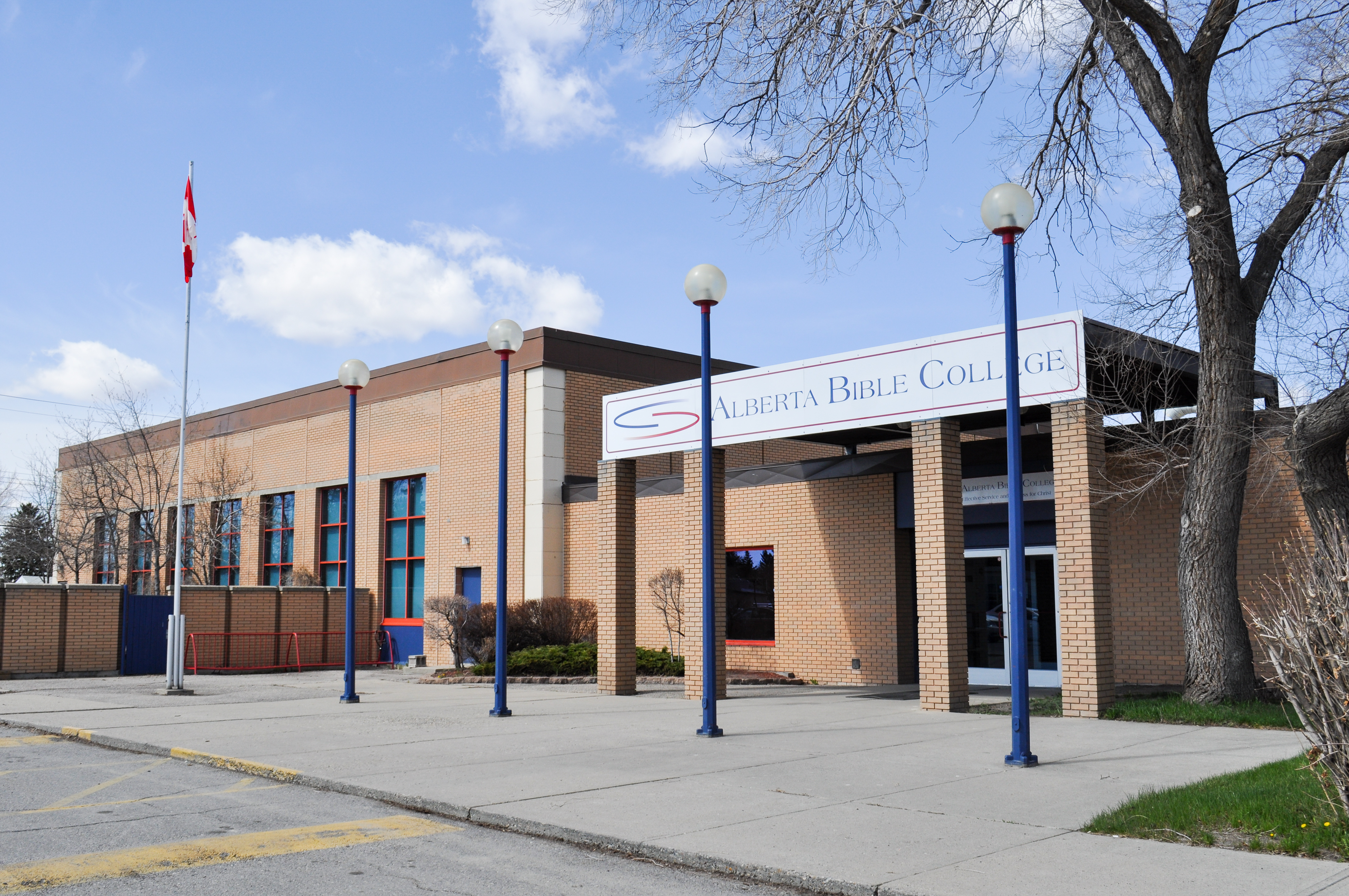

Alberta Bible College is a Canadian Bible college located in Calgary, Alberta, Canada.

== History ==
Alberta Bible College was founded in 1932 following a motion by Helen McGilvary, with C. H. Phillips beginning classes in a church basement alongside a small group of students. The college was established through collaboration among Alberta congregations, with significant support from E. E. Breakenridge and others, and it was incorporated in 1936 before moving to a permanent location in 1937. After financial difficulties in the 1960s, the college later stabilized and expanded, eventually achieving accreditation in 2008.
