= Summit Theological Seminary =

Bible college in Indiana

- Type: Unaccredited
- Established: 1974
- Founder: George L. Faull
- Affiliations: Christian churches and churches of Christ
- President: Terry A. Carter, M.S., M.A.Th
- Location: 2766 W Airport Rd, Peru, Indiana, USA; 40.732188°N 86.123956°W
- Mascot: Lion
- Website: www.summit1.org

Summit Theological Seminary is a non-accredited Bible college in Peru, Indiana, on U.S. Route 31. The school is affiliated with the Christian churches and churches of Christ. According to the school website, the school was founded in 1984.

== Programs and degrees ==
Summit offers both non-resident and resident study. Non-resident study utilizes several types of media, requires the student to build a library of various texts, and includes proctored exams. Resident classes are held at various times during the week on the campus of the school. Both programs can be combined toward a degree.

The school offers a Diploma of Biblical Studies program, and bachelor's and master's degrees in theology and sacred literature.

== Accreditation ==
Summit is not an accredited school, which is noted on its website in several places. The school discourages attendance if one wants to be ordained by a "mainline denomination" or be an armed forces chaplain.

According to Summit, other Bible colleges "may or may not accept our under-graduate credits because we are not accredited."

The founder and chancellor of Summit was George L. Faull, who died in 2021. He had been preaching since 1962 and earned a Doctor of Religion degree in 1981. He was the evangelist at several local congregations and wrote for over 15 publications.
