= Standex International =

American multinational manufacturer

- Type: Public
- Traded as: NYSE: SXI; S&P 600 component
- Industry: Electronics, Engraving, Scientific, Engineering Technologies for Aviation, Space and Defense, Precision Storgage, Hydraulics
- Founded: 1955; 71 years ago
- Founder: John Bolten, Sr
- Headquarters: 23 Keewaydin Drive, Suite 300, Salem, New Hampshire, United States
- Area served: Worldwide
- Key people: David Dunbar (CEO); Alan Glass (Vice President); Ademir Sarcevic (Chief Finance Officer)
- Products: Reed Switches; Reed Relays; Sensor Solution Technologies; Power Magnetics, Precision Storage; Metal Forming Solutions; Hydraulics
- Number of employees: 3,800 (2025)
- Website: www.standex.com

Standex International Corporation is a multi-industry manufacturer in four broad business segments: Electronics, Engravings, Aerospace/Defense, and Scientific with operations in the United States, Europe, Canada, Japan, Singapore, Mexico, Turkey, India, and China. Headquartered in Salem, New Hampshire. Standex is divided into 12 units and 4 reporting segments. The company was incorporated in 1955 and contains multiple subsidiaries including Bakers Pride and Standex Electronics.

== History ==
After World War II John Bolten Sr. and his sons founded a vinyl sheeting company under the name, Bolta Plastics. In 1954, General Tire and Rubber bought the company for $4 million. Bolten reinvested the funds into Standard Publishing, a religious publishing company founded in 1866, and Roehlen Engraving, a steel engraving company. In 1955, Bolten incorporated his company. Standard Publishing was acquired by the Wicks Group in 2006.

During the corporation's early years multiple acquisitions were made including a Coca-Cola bottling company in South America and cleansing product manufacturers consisting of Everedy cookware, Lestoil, and Bon Am. Daniel Hogan, Bolten Sr's son-in-law, succeeded Bolten as company president. Under his management the corporation experienced massive expansion.

Hogan took the company public in 1964 and renamed the corporation in 1973 to Standex. Between 1971 and 1975, Standex's net sales increased by 48%, growing from $119 million to $176 million. By 1984 the company's expansion was halted after a series of rash mergers and acquisitions. In 1985 the company debt-to-capital ratio fell to 20%. Hogan, after 37 years with Standex, stepped down as president passing the position to Thomas L. King.

In 1994, Standex purchased Toastswell, a company founded in the late 1920s from the Pavelka family. Toastswell assets were later purchased from Standex in 1997 by Star Manufacturing International.

In 2012, the Electronics Division grew further when Standex acquired Meder Electronic GmbH, a specialist in Reed Switch technology. In 2017, the acquisition of the reed switch division of OKI in Japan helped position Standex a leader in the manufacturing of reed switches and reed-based products.

In July 2020, Standex acquired Renco Electronics for $28 million.

== Company ==
In November 2017, Standex began trading ex-dividends at $0.18 per share. This represented a 12.5% increase over the prior dividend payment. SXI's earnings per share was measured at $3.61. In January 2018, the stock price had fallen below $100 per share with investors looking at the stock's potential upside.

== Divisions ==
- Standex Electronics
- Standex Scientific
- Spincraft Aerospace and Defense
- Standex Engraving
