= Isaac Errett =

American journalist

Isaac Errett (January 2, 1820 in New York City – December 19, 1888 in Cincinnati, Ohio) was a United States clergyman and editor who was a leader in the early Restoration Movement.

== Biography ==
Errett's parents were converts of Alexander Campbell, and he became a preacher in the Restoration Movement in 1840. He held pastorates in Pittsburgh, Pennsylvania; New Lisbon, Warren, and North Bloomfield, Ohio; Detroit, Muir, and Ionia, Michigan, and in Chicago. He worked with Alexander Campbell on the Millennial Harbinger, and in 1866 he began the publication of the Christian Standard in Cleveland.

He was elected president of Alliance College in Alliance, Ohio in 1868, but soon resigned, and established himself in Cincinnati, where he continued the publication of the Christian Standard which became the foremost weekly periodical of his church. He received the degree of LL.D. from Butler University in 1886, was corresponding secretary of the Ohio Christian Missionary Society from 1853 until 1856, and president from 1867 until 1870. He was also corresponding secretary of the General Christian Missionary Society from 1857 until 1860, and president from 1874 until 1876, and president of the foreign society from 1875 till 1886.

== Selected works ==
- Debate on Spiritualism with Joel Tiffany (1855)
- A Brief View of Missions (1857)
- Walks about Jerusalem (1871)
- Talks to Bereans (1872)
- Letters to Young Christians (1875)
- Review of a Tract by Dr. Thomas O. Summers, entitled "Why I am not a Campbellite"
- Evenings with the Bible (2 vols., 1884 and 1887)

He also wrote numerous pamphlets.

== Family ==
His brother Russell was a United States Congressman.
