= Franjo Benzinger =

Croatian pharmacist

Franjo Benzinger (November 26, 1899 – March 29, 1991) was a Croatian pharmacist. He was born in Vukovar and finished school at the university in Zagreb, where he also became a professor in the pharmacy school. He died in Zagreb.

== Sources ==
- Regula-Bevilacqua, Ljerka (2009). "Prof. dr. Franjo Benzinger, farmakotehnolog" (PDF). Prirodoslovlje (in Croatian). 9 (1–2). Matica hrvatska: 143–158. ISSN 1333-6347.
