= Louisville Bible College =

Coordinates: 38°07′25.1″N 85°36′45.0″W

- Type: Private
- Established: 1948
- Affiliations: Christian churches and churches of Christ
- President: Kerry Allen
- Location: Louisville, USA
- Colors: Burgundy & Gold
- Nickname: Trailblazers
- Website: www.louisvillebible.net

Louisville Bible College is a private, co-educational college located in southeast Louisville, Kentucky, United States. It was founded in September 1948. LBC's mission is "to educate preachers and other Christian leaders for Christ's Church."

The college is authorized to grant degrees in the Commonwealth of Kentucky as a religious institution with a letter on file with the Council on Postsecondary Education.

== Courses of study ==
=== Degrees ===
- Certificate of Christian Leadership
- Associate of Sacred Literature
- Bachelor of Sacred Literature
- Master of Sacred Literature

All associate degree students major in Bible and select one of the following specialties:

- Ministry
- Christian Education

All bachelor's degree students major in Bible and:

- General Ministries

Master's degree students select one of the following:

- Bible (Focus: Old Testament or New Testament)
- Bible and Ministry
- Bible and Theology

== Student life ==
LBC is primarily a commuter campus with student housing available for those beyond a commuting distance.

Students are encouraged to participate in campus life (such as cookouts with administration, faculty and staff) and to cultivate a network of Christian mentors and friends.

Chapel services are held and are considered to be an important part of Student Life. They are developed to meet students' spiritual formation needs.

== Board of Regents ==
The Board of Regents is the governing body of the college. The board is responsible for hiring the President, setting policy, approving the budget, securing adequate funding/resources, and advancing the mission of the institution.

== Presidents ==
The college has had seven presidents.

- Ira M. Boswell (1949–1950)
- Ralph L. Records (1950–1965)
- Frank W. Buck (1965–1971)
- Thomas R. Omer (1971–1990)
- Tommy W. Mobley, D.Min. (1990–2004; 2016–present)
- Charles A. McNeely, D.D. (2004–2009)
- Tracy W. Marx, D.Min. (2010–2015)
- Kerry Allen, A.A, B.A, MSL (2020-Present)

== Campus facilities ==
The current campus is located at 8211 Restoration Drive in Louisville and consists of the following facilities.

- Ralph L. Records Hall
- Ira M. Boswell Memorial Library
- Chapel is available at LifeBridge Christian Church next to the campus

== Notable students ==
- Pat Day – Inductee, National Museum of Racing and Hall of Fame

== Gallery ==
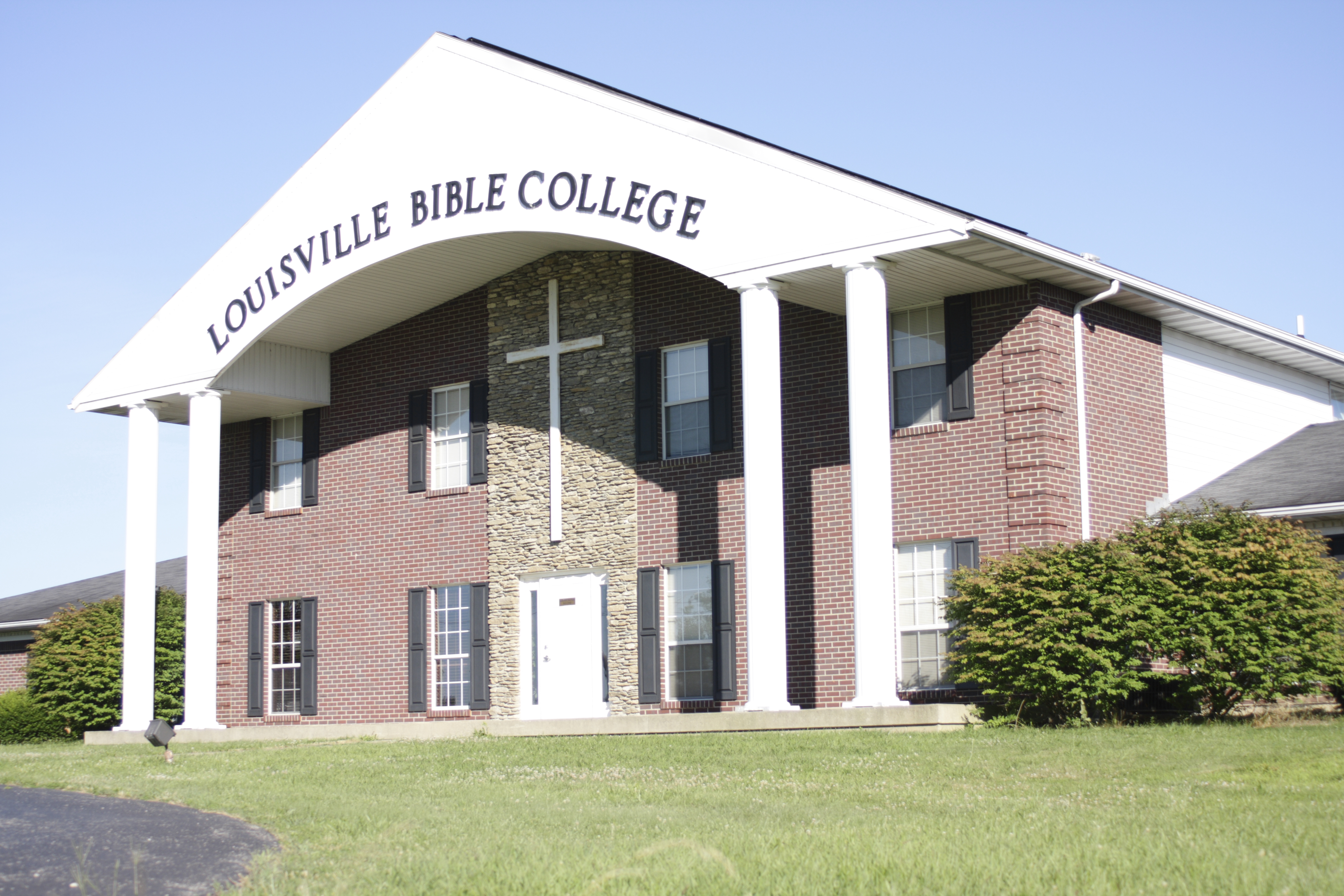
Records Hall

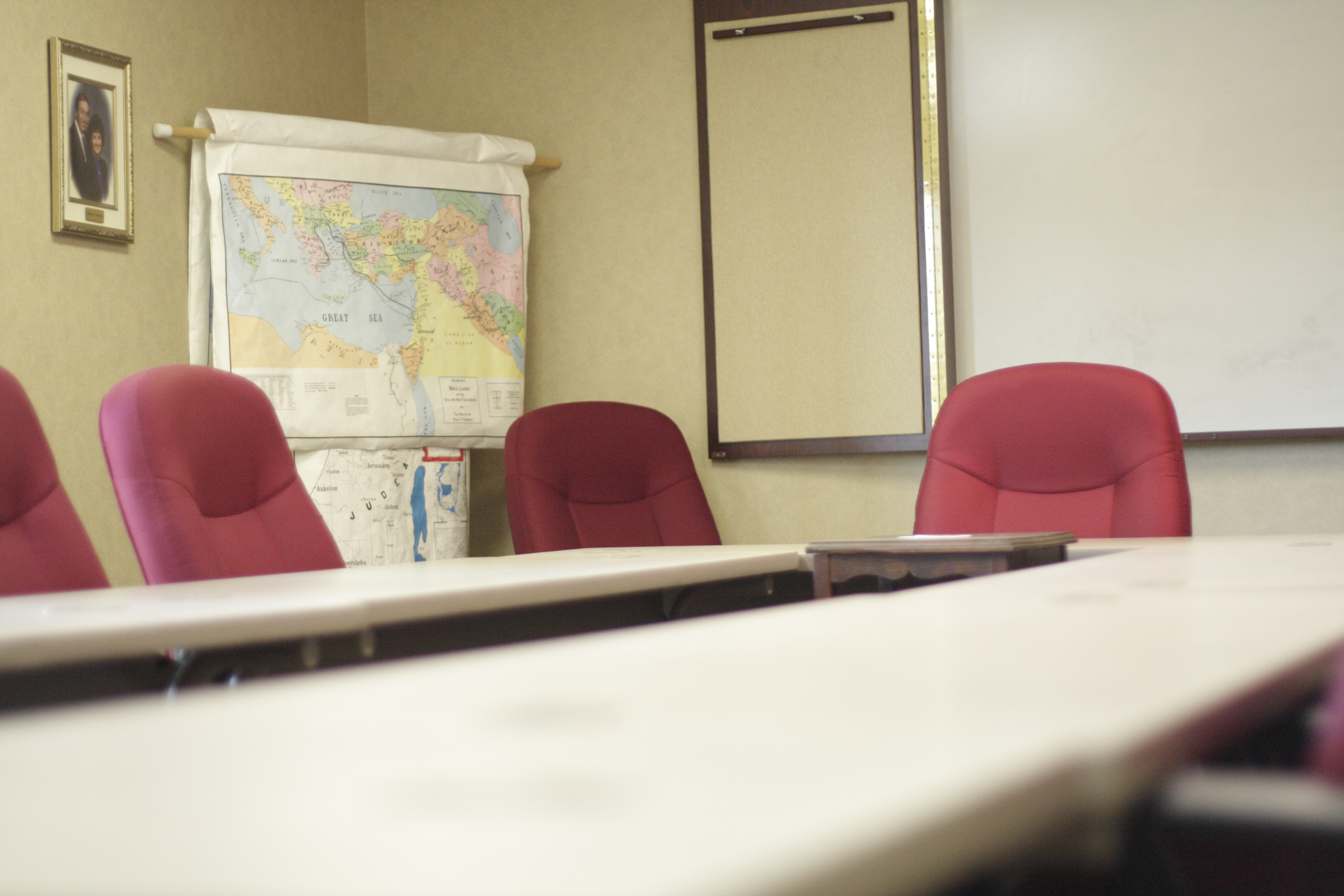
Gray Room

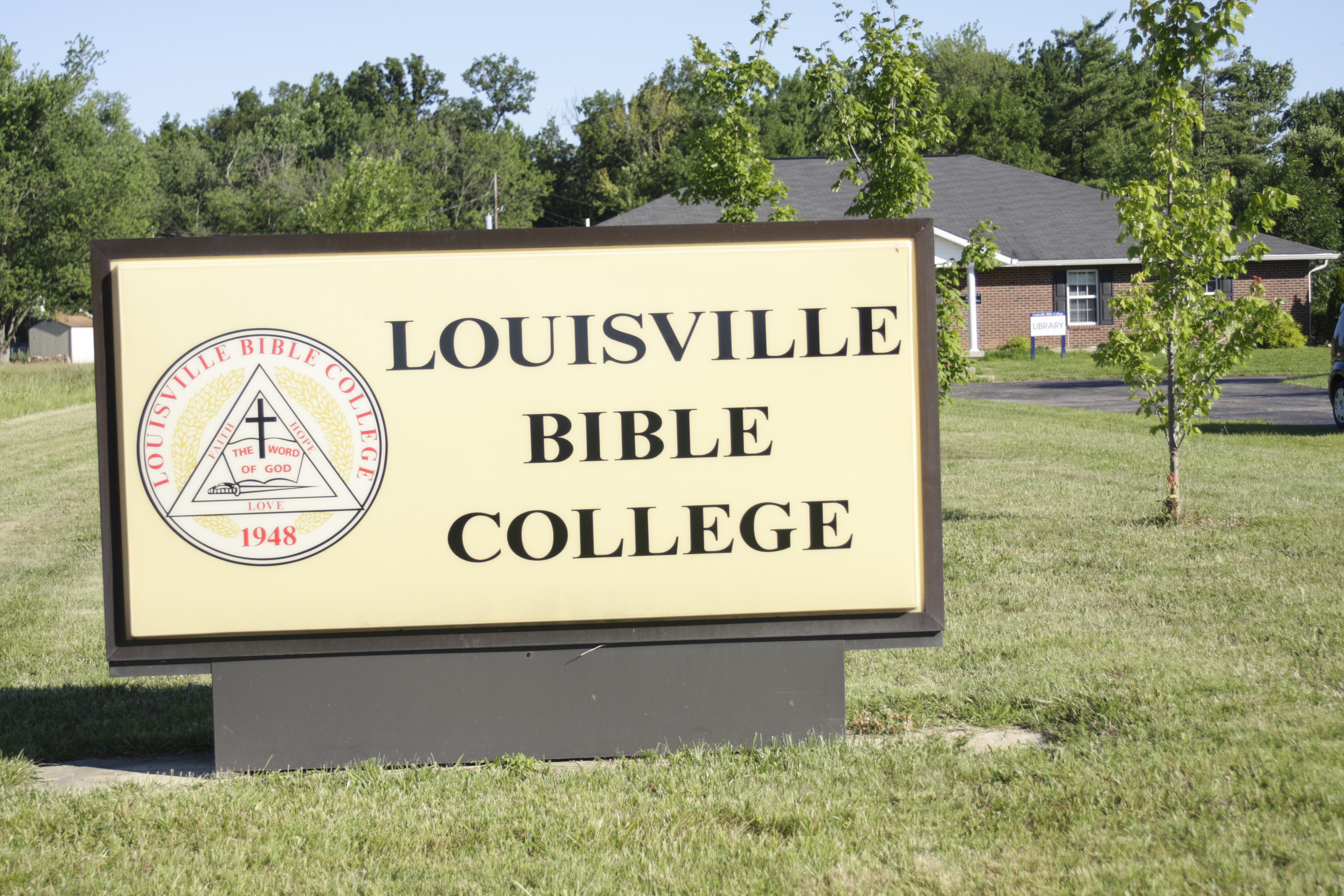
Campus Entrance

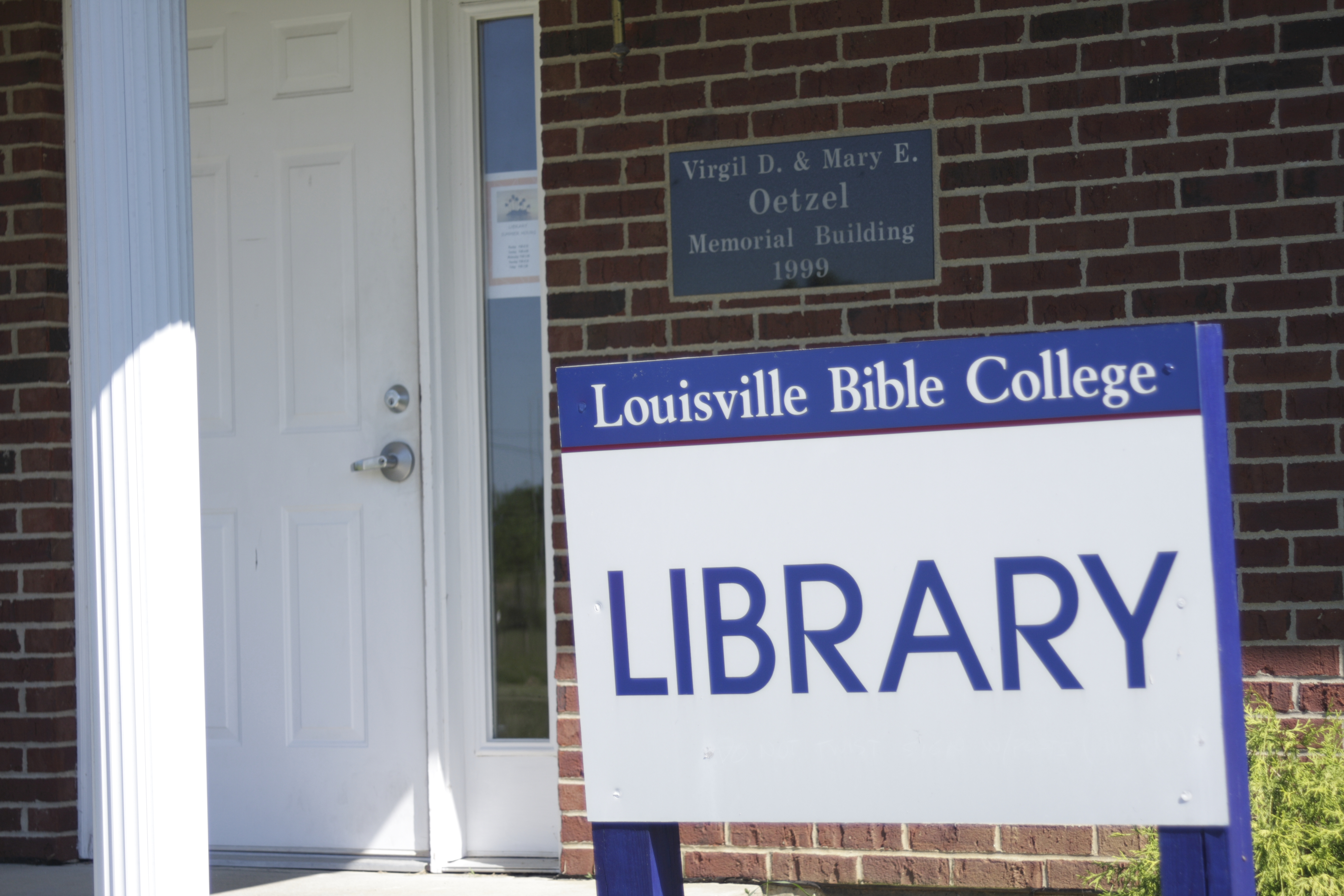
Boswell Memorial Library

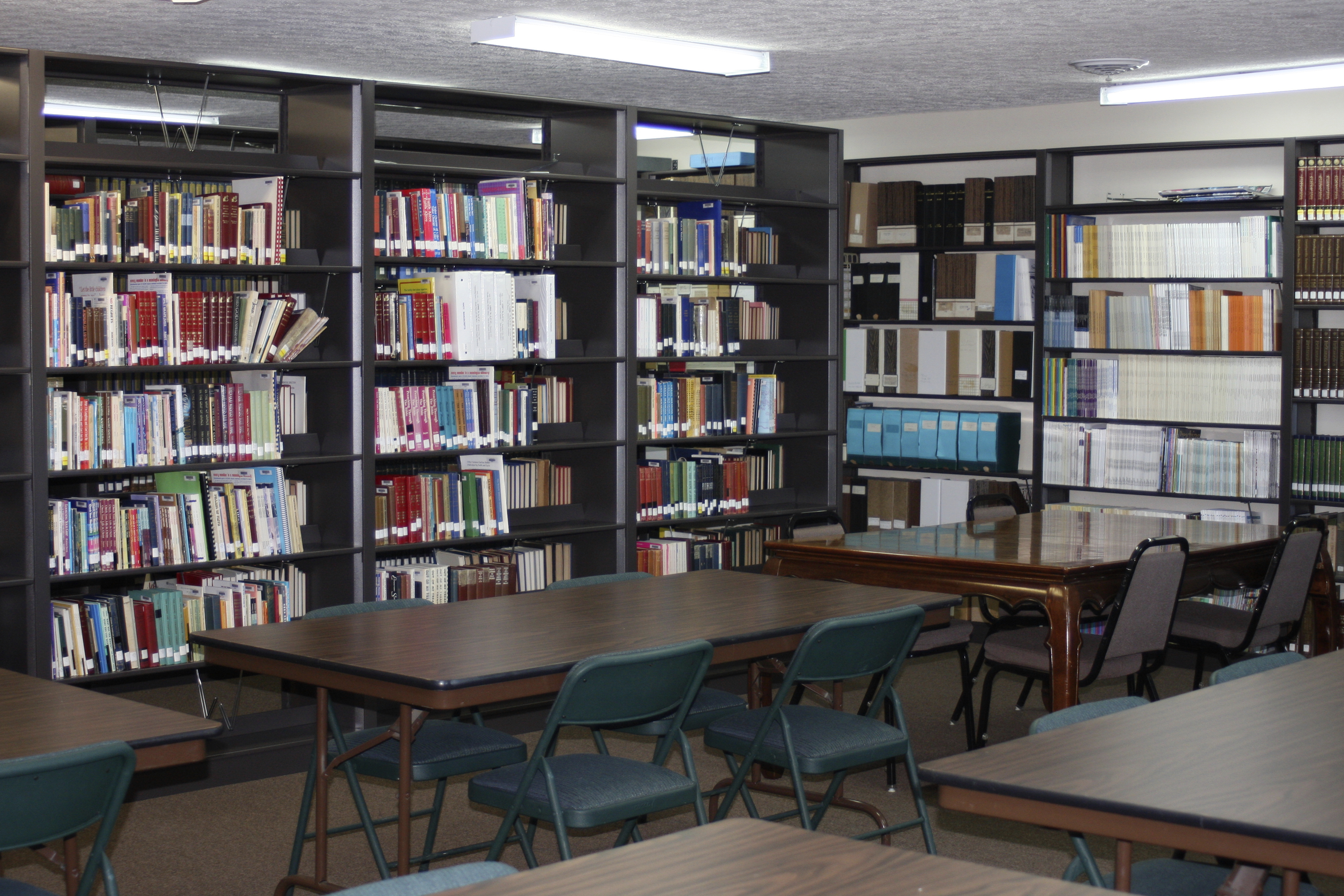
Library Stacks

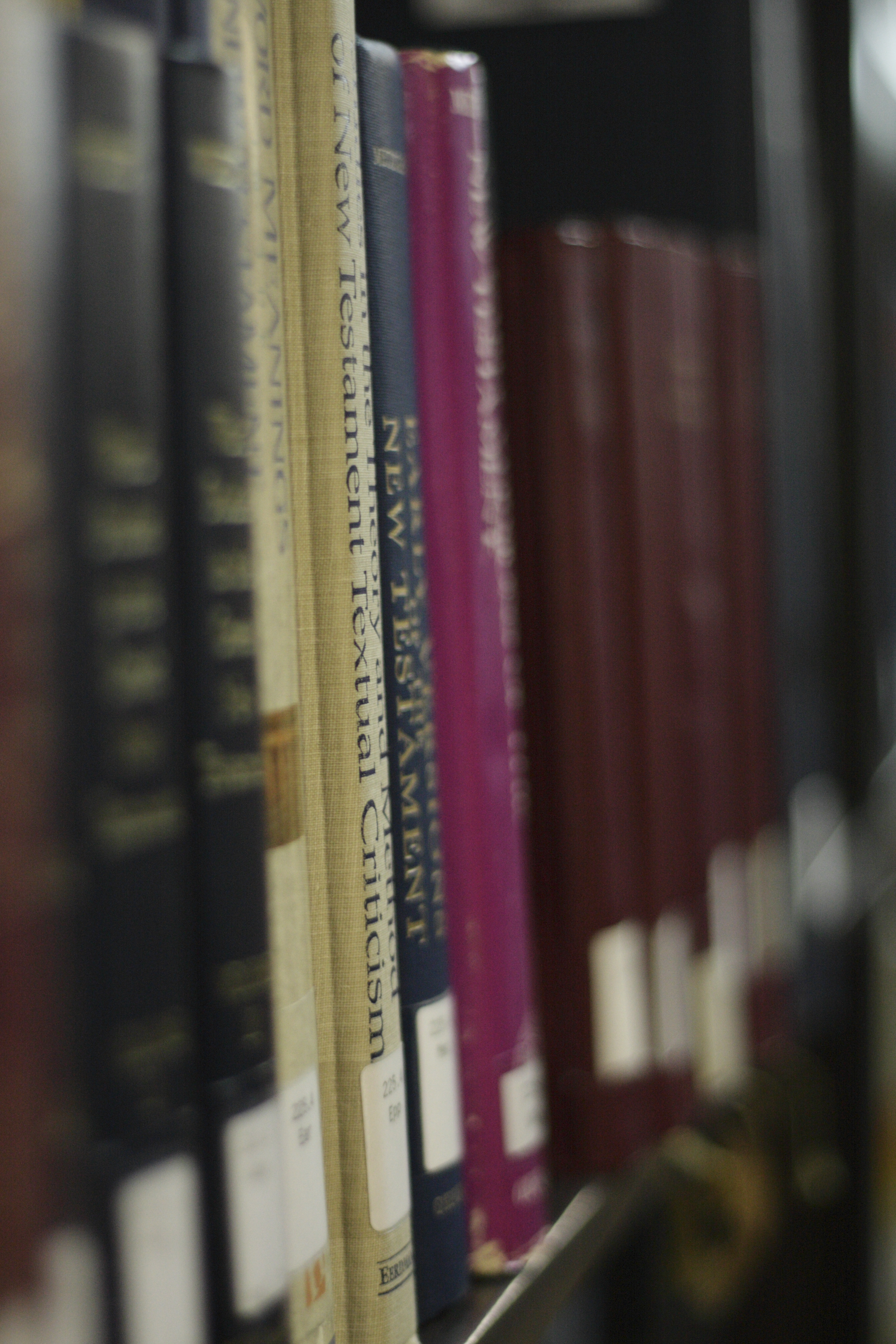
Library—New Testament Studies

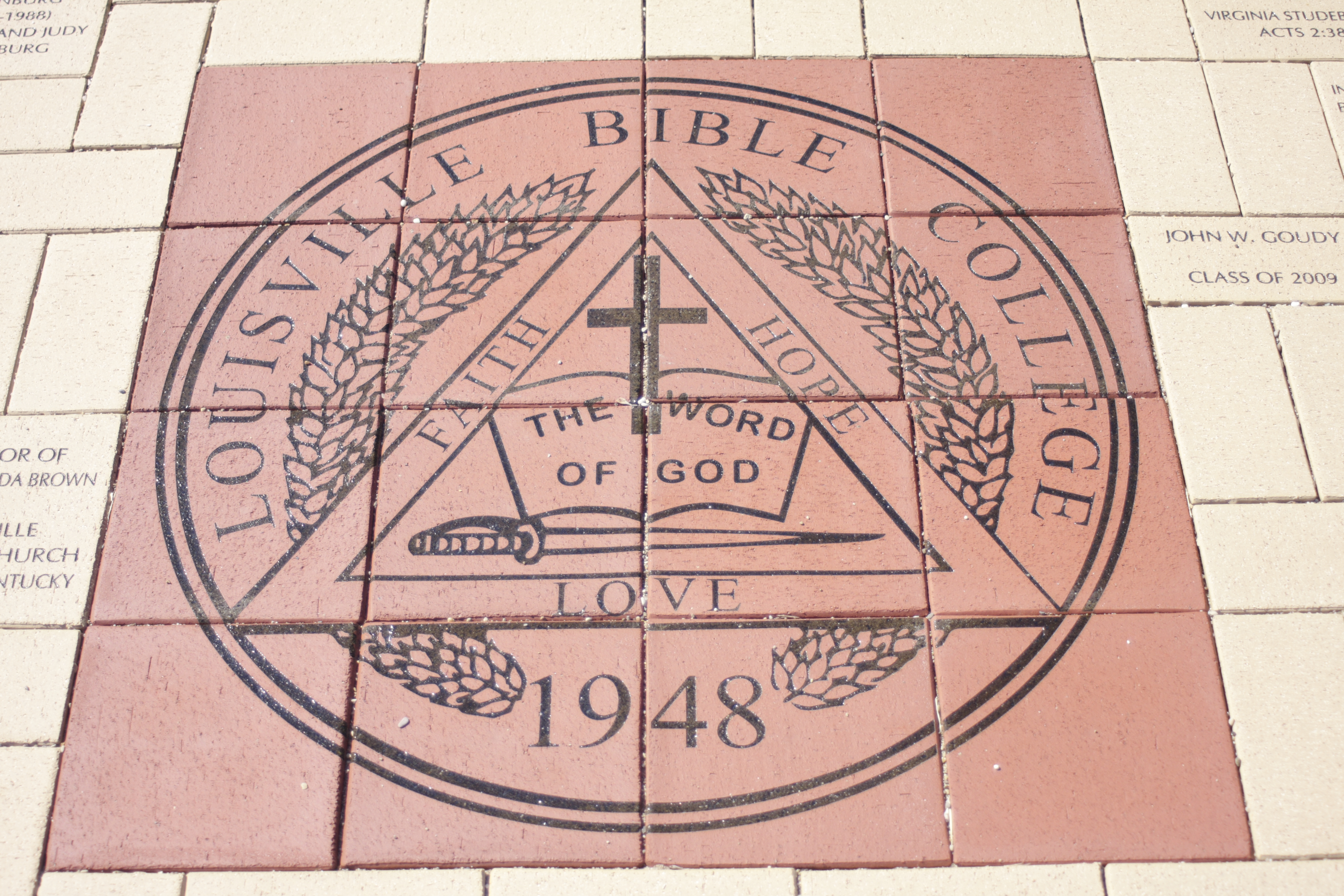
Inspiration Garden—College Seal

== See also ==
- Religion in Louisville, Kentucky
