= Summit Christian College =

Coordinates: 41°49′45″N 103°40′32″W

- Former names: Platte Valley Bible College
- Type: Private Christian
- Established: 1951
- Religious affiliation: Christian churches and churches of Christ
- President: David K. Parrish
- Students: 23
- Location: Gering, Nebraska, United States
- Website: www.summitcc.edu

Summit Christian College is a private Christian college in Gering, Nebraska, United States. It was established in 1951 in Scottsbluff as Platte Valley Bible College. The college is accredited by the Association for Biblical Higher Learning (ABHE) and offers on-campus and distance education programs leading to bachelor's degrees, associate degrees, and certificates. The college is historically affiliated with non-denominational, Christian churches and churches of Christ of the Restoration Movement. Total enrollment for 2024–25 was 23 students.

== History ==
Early in the college's history, a program of medical missions was the college's major contribution to the efforts of Christian Church-related Bible colleges in the area of world evangelism. The lack of demand and difficulty to provide for such programs eventually led to the discontinuance of the medical mission program at the college.

In 2005, Platte Valley Bible College changed its name to Summit Christian College. Three years later, Summit Christian College moved into a newly remodeled campus in the neighboring city of Gering.

=== Presidents ===
President	Dates
Ellis Baker	1951-1957
Ellwood Beeman	1958-1970
Frank Bush	October 1972-January 1979
Gerald Parriott	July 1981-1985
Lawrence D. Leathermon	November 1985-March 2001
Gerald Parriott	July 2001-2003
Jason Hanselman	May 2003-2008
David Parrish	2009-present
