= RCL Benziger =

Catholic publishing house

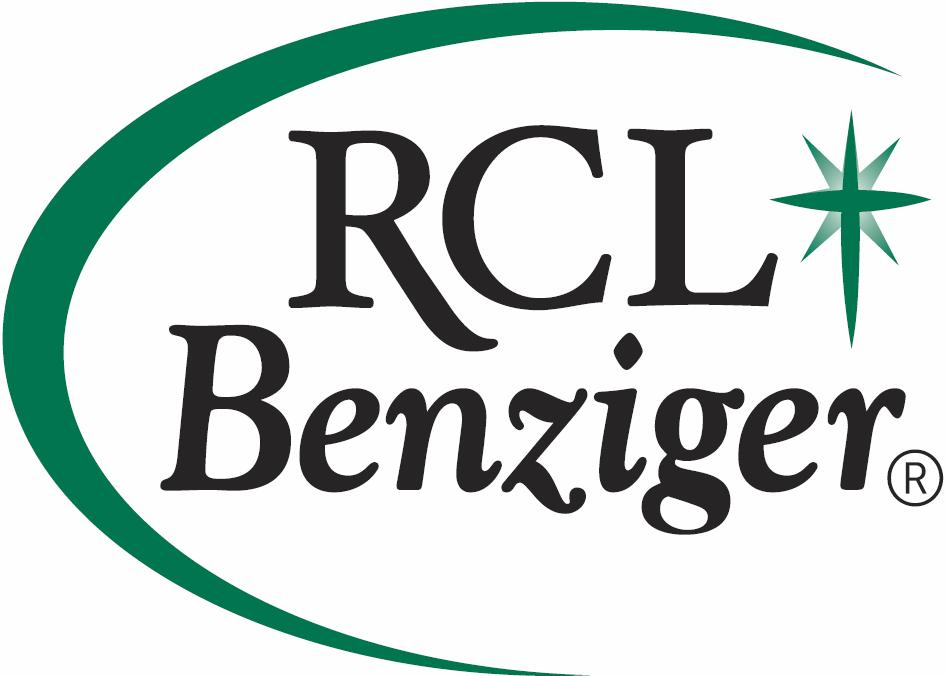
- Parent company: Kendall Hunt
- Predecessor: Benzinger, RCL - Resources for Christian Living
- Founded: 1792
- Founder: Joseph Charles Benziger
- Country of origin: United States
- Headquarters location: Cincinnati, Ohio
- Publication types: Books
- Nonfiction topics: Catholicism
- Official website: www.rclbenziger.com

RCL Benziger is a Catholic book-publishing house founded in 1792 by Joseph Charles Benziger in Einsiedeln, Switzerland. It is currently based in Cincinnati, Ohio, and operates as a subsidiary of Kendall Hunt Publishing.

== History ==
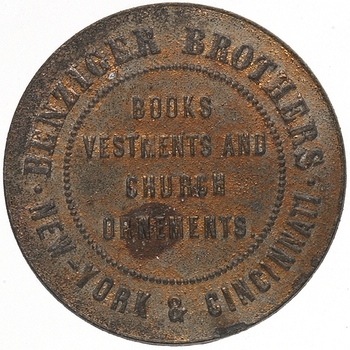
Benziger Brothers token.

The company started as a Catholic religious publisher founded by Joseph Charles Benzinger in 1792. In 1833, Benziger's sons, Charles and Nicholas, succeeded their father under the company name of Charles and Nicholas Benziger Brothers. Two years later, in addition to their book-publishing business, the brothers began lithographing religious pictures, as well as coloring them by hand, before the introduction of chromolithography.

=== Charles Benziger ===
Charles Benziger (b. 1799, d. 1873), a man with a good classical education, devoted himself especially to the literary end of the business. In 1840, the first Einsiedler Kalender volume was produced. The Pilgrim, a popular Catholic periodical established at the same time, lasted only ten years. Charles also took an active part in public life, and served as president of the Swiss canton of Schwyz.

=== Nicholas Benziger ===
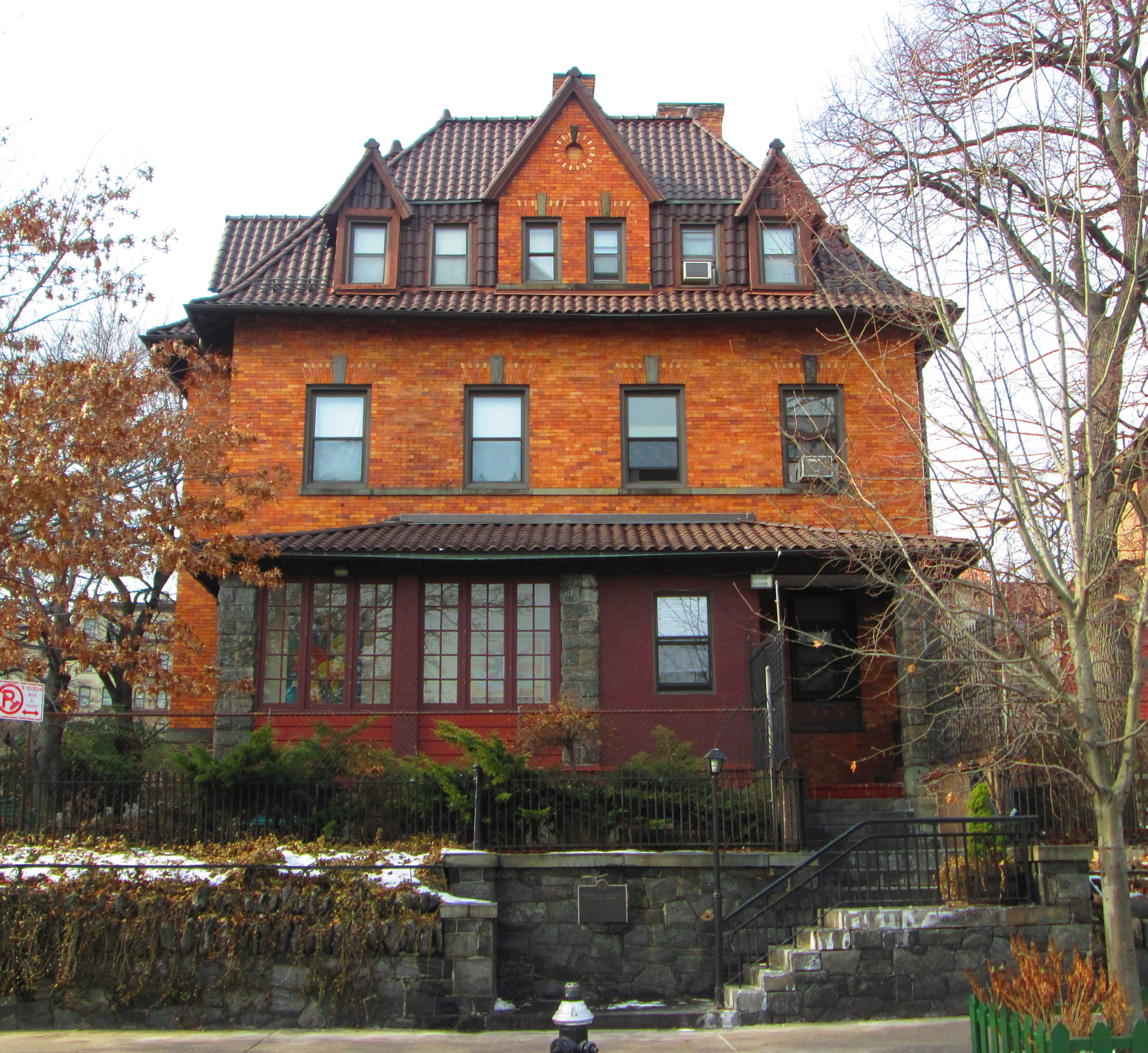
Nicholas Benziger home in New York

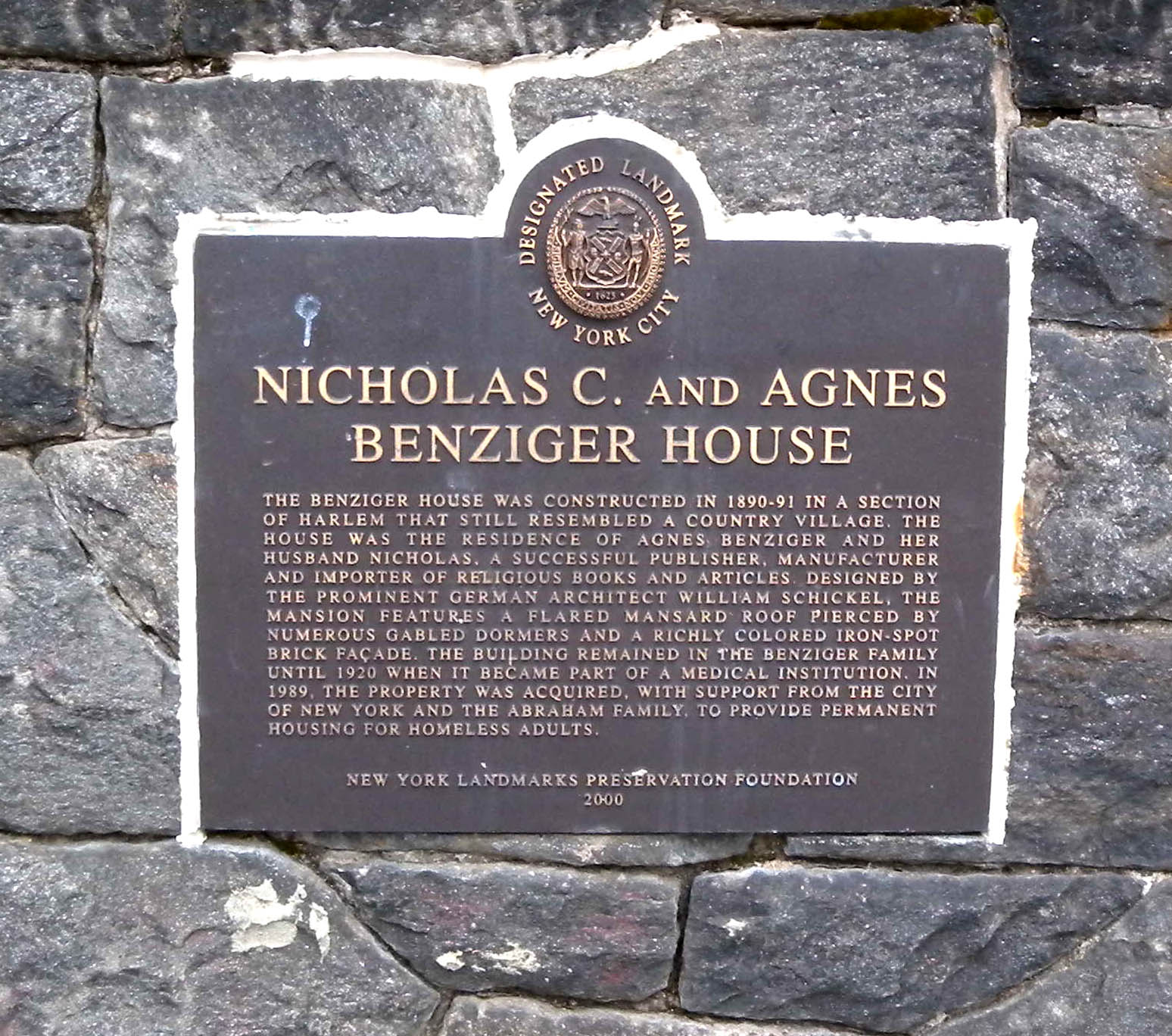

Nicholas Benziger (b. 1808, d. 1864), who took charge of the technical part of the business, proved himself a pioneer, introducing to the mountain village of Einsiedeln a series of improved trade methods from the great mercantile centers of Europe and the United States. Under his guidance, the work of bookbinding, which was formerly undertaken by the family at home, was systematized. In 1844, the old hand press was superseded by the first power press. Stereotyping was introduced in 1846, steel and copper printing in 1856 and electrotyping in 1858.

=== End of 19th century ===
Upon the retirement of Charles and Nicholas Benziger in 1860, the business was continued by three of Charles's sons (Charles, Martin, and J.N. Adelrich) and three of Nicholas's sons (Nicholas, Adelrich, and Louis). Under this third generation, the different branches of the house were further developed, with chromolithography and other modern printing methods added. In 1867, the Alte und Neue Welt, the first illustrated popular Catholic German magazine on a large scale, was begun. A number of illustrated Catholic family books and a series of schoolbooks were produced, including a Bible history in 12 languages, together with prayer books by well-known authors. Between 1880 and 1895, a fourth generation took control of the business, and the firm name was changed to Benziger and Company.

=== Expansion to the United States ===
Although Benziger Brothers had established offices in New York City in 1853, the company's development as a publishing house did not begin until 1860 when J.N. Adelrich Benziger and Louis Benziger took charge. In 1860, offices were opened in Cincinnati and in 1887, one in Chicago. The publishing of English Catholic books was vigorously undertaken, and the company's catalog covered the field of devotional, educational, and juvenile literature, as well as works of a theological theme. Benziger was not only a publishing house but a liturgical-supply factory. The American firm of Benziger Brothers is now independent of the Swiss house. The Holy See conferred on the firm the title "Printers to the Holy Apostolic See" in 1867.

=== 20th and 21st century ===
==== United States ====
In 1968, Benziger's American business was acquired by Crowell-Collier Macmillan (later to become Macmillan, Inc.), and the following year, its headquarters were moved to California. In 1971, it was merged with three other companies: Bruce Publishing, founded in Milwaukee in the 1890s, P. J. Kenedy & Sons of New York (excluding the Official Catholic Directory), and Glencoe Press, which began in Beverly Hills in 1966. In July 2007, the Benziger name and product line were purchased from McGraw-Hill (which had acquired Macmillan's educational division) by CFM Publishing and merged with Texas-based Catholic publisher RCL (Resources for Christian Living), founded in 1964 by Richard C. Leach, to form RCL Benziger. The new company is now headquartered in Cincinnati as it was in the 19th century. In 2016, RCL Benziger was sold to Kendall Hunt Publishing.

==== Europe ====
Benziger's Swiss operation was also growing at the end of the 19th century. At the peak of its expansion in the 1890s, Benziger published books and magazines in 20 languages and had more than 1,000 employees in Switzerland alone, making it one of the largest Swiss companies at the time.

The company opened locations in Cologne in 1884 and Strasbourg in 1912. A bookstore in Waldshut was added as early as 1887, but was sold in 1936 and was closed in 2019. The First World War brought major setbacks, as the company was separated from its main sales areas. The Benziger family withdrew from the active publishing business. Later, the rise of National Socialism had a lasting effect on sales of the traditionally Catholic-oriented program.

After the Second World War, the theological program was supplemented by a wide range of books for children and young people. Some of the best-known authors included:

- Becher
- Jean-Luc Benoziglio
- S. Corinna Bille
- Michael Bond
- Niklaus Brantschen
- Erika Burkart
- Jacques Chessex
- Khalil Gibran
- René Girard
- Herbert Haag
- Dag Hammarskjöld
- Eveline Hasler
- Jeanne Hersch
- Taikan Jyoji
- Hans Küng
- Francis Xavier Lasance
- Thomas Merton
- Herbert Meier
- John Henry Newman
- Seán Ó Faoláin
- Karl Rahner
- Alice Rivaz
- Gustave Roud
- Hansjörg Schneider
- Patrick Augustine Sheehan
- Otto Steiger
- Edith Stein
- Leo Tolstoi
- Walter Vogt

In 1986, the publishing house was sold to the Rheinpfalz Group in Ludwigshafen, and the children's book division was bought by Arena Publishing in Würzburg. After a creeping decline, Benziger's Swiss operation was taken over by Patmos Publishing in 1994. In 2003, publishing activities under the Benziger name were discontinued. In 1985, Benziger spun off its publishing distribution. Since 2015, it has been operating under the name Balmer Bücherdienst AG and is the second-largest intermediate book-trade company in Switzerland. In 1986, the printing house in Einsiedeln was separated from the publishing house to become an independent stock corporation like the publishing house. Without the publishing house, however, the company could no longer bring in sufficient revenue and was discontinued in 1995. The Einsiedeln bookstore founded in 1802 was sold in 1987, but, still exists under its old name.
