= Joseph Charles Benziger =

Joseph Charles Benziger (1762–1841) was the founder of RCL Benziger, a Catholic publishing house, and president of Feldkirch District.

== Biography ==
Benziger was born in 1762 in Einsiedeln, Switzerland. His relative Karl Benziger had begun selling religious articles in 1716, renting a business from the local Benedictine order and traveling through Europe to sell his goods, a business continued and expanded by his son Sales Benziger. Joseph Charles took up the family business in 1792, but he soon felt the effects of the French Revolution. The French invasion of Switzerland forced him to take flight with his family, and for about a year they resided at Feldkirch, Austria, where his eldest son, Charles, was born.

In 1800, Benziger and his family returned to Einsiedeln, which had been devastated by pillage and army requisitions. Benziger, who had lost most of his fortune in the war, rebuilt his business as a Catholic printing house. His sons Charles and Nicholas inherited the company in 1833, naming it Benziger Brothers; it continued under that name until 2007, when it merged with the publisher Resources for Christian Living and took the name RCL Benziger.

Benziger was also politically active, serving as president of Feldkirch District during the famine of 1817.
