= Great Lakes Christian College =

Private college in Delta Township, Michigan, U.S.

Coordinates: 42.75431°N 84.63847°W

- Former name: Great Lakes Bible College
- Type: Private college
- Established: 1949
- Religious affiliation: Christian Churches and Churches of Christ
- President: Frank Weller
- Students: ~225
- Location: Delta Township, Michigan, United States
- Campus: Suburban, 47 acres
- Colors: Blue and White
- Nickname: Crusaders
- Sporting affiliations: NCCAA Division II – Mid-West
- Website: www.glcc.edu

Great Lakes Christian College (GLCC) is a private Christian college in Delta Charter Township, Michigan, United States. It was founded in 1949 and is supported by and affiliated with the Christian Churches and Churches of Christ.

== History ==
The school was founded as Great Lakes Bible College in 1949 at Rock Lake, Michigan, near Vestaburg, with a student body of 12. In 1951, the college purchased a nearby farm, which was converted into the first campus. The college subsequently moved to the Dodge Mansion in Lansing in 1958. In 1972, the college purchased 47 acres (19 ha) of land in Delta Township and built the new campus there.

In 1992, the college changed its name to Great Lakes Christian College. In March 2008, GLCC dedicated its new multi-purpose facility, the Doty Center, named in honor of the late Dr. Brant Lee Doty. The Knowles Learning Center, which includes a faculty offices and a conference room, was constructed in 2011.

== Academics ==
GLCC has been accredited by the Higher Learning Commission since 2003. It was accredited by the Association for Biblical Higher Education (ABHE) from 1977 until 2016, but remains an ABHE member institution.

In 2014, the college had a student to faculty ratio of roughly 13:1 and 80% of the faculty had obtained or were pursuing their professional doctorates. Students at GLCC study for a bachelor's, majoring in Bible & Theology concurrently with their selected major. The campus is home to the Doty Center (a multi-purpose athletics facility), three dormitory buildings and an administration building, which contains faculty offices, classrooms, and the school library.

The school's curriculum is based around its Bible/Theology program. All four-year students attain a major or minor in Bible/Theology upon graduation in addition to their selected major. The college also offers some online classes and degrees, including a graduate program.

== Athletics ==
The school offers men's and women's basketball, men's and women's soccer, men's and women's wrestling, men's baseball, men's golf, women's volleyball, and co-ed cross country and disc golf in the Mideast Region of Division II of the National Christian College Athletic Association.
