= Great Lakes Bible College =

- Other names: GLBC, GL Bible College, glbiblecollege
- Motto: STUDEAMUS PROBATIONIS DEI CAUSA
- Type: Private Bible college
- Established: 1987
- Affiliations: Churches of Christ
- Chair: Glen Robins
- President: Immanuel Velasco
- Dean: Paul Birston
- Academic staff: 10
- Location: Waterloo, ON, Canada
- Campus: Urban multiple sites satellite campus
- Colours: Maroon and black
- Website: www.glbc.ca

Great Lakes Bible College (formerly known as the School of Bible and Missions) is a private Bible college associated with the Churches of Christ located in Waterloo, Ontario, Canada. It is accredited by the Ontario Ministry of Education as a private college.

== History ==
Members of Churches of Christ sought to establish a Christian junior college in the late 1940s to provide an opportunity for Christian education for the international populations of the Great Lakes basin. In 1952, high school classes and an adult Bible department were offered in Beamsville, Ontario in the Niagara Peninsula. Great Lakes Christian High School (formerly Great Lakes Christian College), a residential high school provided post-secondary Bible education (the Bible department in 1952 and 1959; the Faculty of Bible and Missions formed in 1969 and renamed in 1975 as the School of Bible and Missions).

GLBC is chartered as a degree-granting institution by the Government of Ontario under the Great Lakes Bible College Act, 1987.

In 1996, classes were moved from Beamsville, Ontario to Waterloo, Ontario. As of April 2023, Great Lakes Bible College provides classes in-person and online, both synchronously and asynchronously. Great Lakes Bible College also offers short courses in partnership with various local churches.

== Programs ==
=== Academic Programs ===
Great Lakes offers a number of certificates and degrees:

- Foundational Certificates (16 Credit Hours- 6 months to 2 years)
- Certificate of Biblical Studies (CBS) (1 year)
- Diploma of Biblical Studies (DBS) (2 years)
- Bachelor of Religious Education (BRE) (3 years)
- Bachelor of Theology (BTh) (4 years)
