= Central Bible University =

College in Missouri, U.S.

Coordinates: 39°23′46″N 92°25′38″W

- Former name: Central Christian College of the Bible
- Motto in English: Faithful on Purpose
- Established: 1957
- Accreditation: ABHE
- Affiliations: Christian Churches and Churches of Christ
- Academic affiliations: Association for Biblical Higher Education
- Chancellor: Lloyd Pelfrey
- President: David B. Fincher
- Students: 300+
- Location: Moberly, Missouri, 60270, U.S.
- Colors: Crimson and white
- Nickname: Saints (formerly Heralds)
- Sporting affiliations: NCCAA
- Mascot: Herald the Saint
- Website: www.centralbible.edu

Central Bible University is a private Christian college in Moberly, Missouri, United States. Founded in 1957, it is accredited by the Association for Biblical Higher Education and focuses on biblical instruction and practical training for its students. It offers Bachelor of Arts and Bachelor of Science degrees and certificates in ministry-related programs. In 2020, Central began offering a graduate program for a Master of Arts in Ministry Leadership degree. In 2026, Central changed its name to Central Bible University from Central Christian College of the Bible.

== Campus ==
Central's campus is located on 28 acres (11.3 ha) in the southeastern part of Moberly. Moberly High School and Zion Lutheran Church are adjacent to the campus. Timber Lake Christian Church and the YMCA are within walking distance.

Central's campus features seven buildings and two outdoor athletic fields. Pelfrey Hall contains the cafeteria, gymnasium, offices, classrooms and conference room. Reese Resource Center, completed in 2001, contains the library and bookstore. Lang Hall is the men's dormitory and Spurling Hall is the women's dormitory. North of Pelfrey Hall is the maintenance facility. Foundation Hall, which opened for residents for the Fall 2004 semester, has been remodeled and contains apartments and a dormitory. The newest facility, the Walton Student Center, contains Central Cafe (a coffee house), lounging areas around TVs, a small theater, a prayer room, and a collaboratory room.

== Athletics ==
The CBU Saints were formerly affiliated with the now defunct Association of Christian College Athletics (ACCA) and are current members of the National Christian College Athletic Association (NCCAA). The men's soccer team placed second in the 2007 ACCA National Tournament, and won the 2008 ACCA National Tournament. The 2008 team placed 8th in the NCCAA Division II National Championships. Central also offers women's volleyball and both men's and women's basketball, and competes in all sports within the Midwest Christian College Conference.

In the 2008–2009 season, the Central Christian College Saints men's basketball team set a school record for most wins in a season with 20 wins. The team placed second in the 2009 ACCA national tournament, while finishing the season with a 20–14 record.

In the 2014–2015 season, the Central Christian College Saints women's basketball team took second at the NCCAA D2 National Tournament.

== Accreditation ==
The university is accredited by the Association for Biblical Higher Education.
