= North American Christian Convention =

Former convention associated with certain churches

The North American Christian Convention (1927–2018) was an annual summer convention supported by churches, colleges, institutions, and missions programs associated with the Christian churches and churches of Christ, mainly across the United States, but also in other parts of the world. First started in 1927, it grew gradually over the years in both attendance and location. The NACC was held annually after 1927 until the end of that decade; the deprivations brought about by the Great Depression and the dislocations caused by World War II contributed to its being held only three times in the 1930s and four times in the 1940s; it was an annual event from 1950 to 2018. Ministers from churches across the United States came and spoke at the event, as well as other well-known speakers and authors of the Christian community. The NACC Mission statement was "the connecting place providing ideas, inspiration, and identity to New Testament Christian Churches and their leaders." Philosophically this organization gives all their credit to Jesus Christ. It was replaced in 2019 by the spire.network conference.

== Events ==
=== Adults ===
Adults were able to participate in three main events: the main session, bible studies, and workshops. The main session was a time of praise and worship, sermons from guest speakers, testimonies, and a time to get to know other people. The bible studies allowed adults to get together with small groups and fellowship one on one. The workshops also allowed adults to choose from various classes in which to learn and grow.

=== Teens ===
Teens were involved in the same events as adults but on a level where they could have fun and grow spiritually at the same time. They had a main session with worship from high energy, world-renowned bands, guest speakers, talk sessions, and entertainment from comedians and performance groups.

=== Children and Toddlers ===
The NACC also had programs for young children. A day camp allowed children to have fun in groups with others their age. Each small group or camp unit was led by an adult leader who provided games and a learning environment. Daycare (Wee-One-Wigwam) was available for young toddlers and babies.

=== Bible Bowl ===
First introduced to NACC at the Tulsa, Oklahoma Convention in 1965, the Bible Bowl drew teens and kids in grades 6–12 every year to compete in scripture memorization and other bible events. It also allowed teens and kids to fellowship with each other and grow through bible studies, guest speakers, and prayer groups. In 2001, Bible Bowl became independent from the NACC and started its own national program as it grew, with separate competitions and events.

=== Minister and Spouse ===
This event focused on bringing spouses closer to each other and with God. Guest speakers and artists allowed for fellowship and fun while events such as hiking, golfing and shopping were meant to allow husband and wife to enjoy their time away.

== Leadership ==
The NACC Board of Stewards, Committees, and Staff members all ensured adherence to the NACC Mission and supported the NACC through prayer, attendance and commitment to personal financial support.

=== Staff ===
The NACC main office was in Cincinnati, Ohio. The Staff were about 7 to 10 members who acted as project managers. They included:

- Managing director – handled day-to-day operations, finalized contracts, and managed the facility plans
- Business administrator & church relations – handled the financial matters
- Special events & workshops coordinator – planned & set up the ticketed & non-ticketed meals & receptions, as well as the workshops
- Children's convention and marketing/promotions coordinator – coordinated the children's planning committee and the publicity & marketing materials
- Information Technology Coordinator
- Registration and office services coordinator – managed registration and customer service on-site, and many other things
- Executive administration and program/production manager – worked with all the leadership committees and implement the main programming.

There were a few supporting cast members outside the office, like the person who coordinated the Student Convention, and the partner that handled the registration and hotel reservation data entry.

=== Board of Stewards ===
The Board of Stewards consisted of ten members who are the past President, current President, President-Elect, on average 6 members and the current NACC Executive Director. The ten of them come together and have these duties to accomplish. First, they Set and review corporate policies. Second, they worked to provide review and accountability to the Executive Director and the NACC Staff. Ensure fiscal satiability, including but not limited to, setting budgets and raising funds. Approve the venue and cities for NACC events. Then lastly they focus on long-range and strategic issues.

=== Continuation Committee ===
The Continuation Committee consisted of on average 120 members including all eligible past Presidents who represent the Christian churches and churches of Christ across the United States and Canada. They are a group who served as a support system and gave advice to the executive committee and the Board of Stewards. They served a three-year term in this position. These members are from all over the country, they came together every October before the next summer convention and met in the city that it was going to be held at. During the October planning meeting they assisted the executive committee plan for the future NACCs by providing guidance on potential speakers, workshop topics, and workshop leaders.

=== Executive committee ===
The Executive Committees were made up of thirteen members including the President, Vice President, Secretary/Treasurer, on average 6 members two local arrangement committee Co-Chairs, National prayer chair, and the NACC Managing Director. The main role the executive committee was to plan and put in order all the NACC programs for their appointed year.

=== Presidency ===
The President, Vice President, and Secretary/Treasurer were chosen three years before their convention summer. The current President formed a Nomination Committee in the spring before the new president was elected. After the possible candidates were nominated, the committee prayerfully chose who would fill the new presidential board. The President provided leadership and approved all recommendations for the NACC event. He served as the primary NACC representative to the constituency through travel, writing and speaking engagements.

== Conventions ==
Year	Dates	Location	President
2018	July 26–28	Indianapolis, Indiana	Drew Sherman
2017	July 27–29	Kansas City, Missouri	Gene Appel
2016	July 12–15	Anaheim, California	Dave Stone
2015	June 23–26	Cincinnati, Ohio	Mike Baker
2014	July 8–11	Indianapolis, Indiana	Tim Harlow
2013	July 9–12	Louisville, Kentucky	Matt Proctor
2012	July 10–13	Orlando, Florida	Rick Rusaw
2011	July 5–8	Cincinnati, Ohio	Dudley Rutherford
2010	July 6–9	Indianapolis, Indiana	Ben Cachiaras
2009	August 11–13	M & S Retreat	Stephen and Lisa Sams
2009	June 30 – July 3	Louisville, Kentucky	Jeff Stone
2008	July 1–4	Cincinnati, Ohio	Cam Huxford
2007	August 21–23	M & S Retreat	Tom and Kay Moll
2007	July 3–6	Kansas City, Missouri	Alan Ahlgrim
2006	June 27–30	Louisville, Kentucky	David Faust
2005	August 16–18	M & S Retreat	Howard and Marsha Brammer
2005	July 12–14	Jacksonville, Florida	Howard Brammer
2005	June 28–30	Lexington, Kentucky	Howard Brammer
2005	May 24–26	Corona, California	Howard Brammer
2004	July 5–8	Phoenix, Arizona	Dick Alexander
2003	July 8–11	Indianapolis, Indiana	Bob Russell
2002	June 24–27	Columbus, Ohio	Barry McMurtrie
2001	June 26–29	Tampa, Florida	Tom Ellsworth
2000	July 11–14	Louisville, Kentucky	Don Wilson
1999	July 6–9	Denver, Colorado	Wayne Shaw
1998	June 23–26	St. Louis, Missouri	Dennis Slaughter
1997	July 1–4	Kansas City, Missouri	Sam E. Stone
1996	July 2–5	Dallas, Texas	John Caldwell
1995	July 16–20	Indianapolis, Indiana	Marshall Hayden
1994	July 5–8	Orlando, Florida	Wally Rendel
1993	July 6–9	St. Louis, Missouri	Charles E. Cook
1992	July 14–17	Anaheim, California	Ken Idleman
1991	July 9–12	Denver, Colorado	David McCord
1990	July 10–13	Kansas City, Missouri	Richard D. Hogan
1989	July 11–14	Louisville, Kentucky	R. Allan Dunbar
1988	July 5–8	Cincinnati, Ohio	David Corts
1987	July 14–17	Oklahoma City, Oklahoma	Dale McCann
1986	July 6–10	Indianapolis, Indiana	Kenneth A. Meade
1985	July 9–12	Anaheim, California	Knofel Staton
1984	July 10–13	Atlanta, Georgia	David L. Eubanks
1983	July 26–29	St. Louis, Missouri	Floyd Strater
1982	July 27–30	Kansas City, Missouri	E. LeRoy Lawson
1981	July 7–10	Louisville, Kentucky	Calvin L. Phillips
1980	July 8–11	Seattle, Washington	Dennis R. Fulton
1979	July 24–27	St. Louis, Missouri	Robert C. Shannon
1978	July 11–14	Oklahoma City, Oklahoma	Ben Merold
1977	July 5–8	Cincinnati, Ohio	Wayne B. Smith
1976	July 6–9	Denver, Colorado	E. Ray Jones
1975	July 8–11	Detroit, Michigan	Russell F. Blowers
1974	July 23–26	Anaheim, California	Thomas W. Overton
1973	July 10–13	Indianapolis, Indiana	W. F. Lown
1972	July 11–14	Cincinnati, Ohio	E. Richard Crabtree
1971	July 6–9	Dallas, Texas	Marshall J. Leggett
1970	July 7–10	St. Louis, Missouri	William S. Boice
1969	July 8–11	Detroit, Michigan	Douglas A.Dickey
1968	July 9–12	Cincinnati, Ohio	Burris Butler
1967	June 28 – July 2	Tampa, Florida	L. Palmer Young
1966	June 28 – July 1	Louisville, Kentucky	Hugh F. Sensibaugh
1965	June 22–25	Tulsa, Oklahoma	Russell L. Martin
1964	July 7–10	St. Louis, Missouri	Leon H. Appel
1963	June 26–30	Long Beach, California	E. H. Chamberlain
1962	June 26–29	Lexington, Kentucky	Wm. Harold Hockley
1961	April 20–23	Wichita, Kansas	Robert O. Weaver
1960	July 12–15	Columbus, Ohio	Edwin G. Crouch
1959	June 24–28	Atlanta, Georgia	Olin W. Hay
1958	July 9–13	Portland, Oregon	Reuben L. Anderson
1957	May 1–5	Pittsburgh, Pennsylvania	Lester H. Ford
1956	May 8–11	Louisville, Kentucky	Harold W. Scott
1955	Apr 25 – May 1	Indianapolis, Indiana	James Van Buren
1954	June 23–27	Long Beach, California	Francis M. Arant
1953	April 22–26	Canton, Ohio	Harry Poll
1952	April 30 – May 4	Tulsa, Oklahoma	Ernest E. Laughlin
1951	April 25–29	Springfield, Illinois	Joseph H. Dampier
1950	April 26–30	Indianapolis, Indiana	Ard Hoven
1948	April 21–25	Springfield, Illinois	Orval Morgan
1946	May 8–12	Indianapolis, Indiana	William E. Sweeney
1942	October 14–18	Indianapolis, Indiana	Dean E. Walker
1940	October 9–13	Indianapolis, Indiana	P.H. Welshimer
1937	April 21–25	Springfield, Illinois	T. K. Smith
1933	June 21–25	Springfield, Illinois	O. A. Trinkle
1931	June 17–21	Lexington, Kentucky	J. E. Henshaw
1929	October 9–14	Canton, Ohio	P. H. Welshimer
1928	October 10–14	Kansas City, Missouri	Wallace Tharp
1927	October 12–16	Indianapolis, Indiana	P.H. Welshimer

=== Volunteers ===
The President, Vice President, Committee members, and Board members (who had a great part in planning this event) were all volunteers. The Tech teams, teachers of the different workshops, people who watch the kids during the sessions and behind the scenes people are all volunteers. Most of them dedicated one week every summer to attend this event and were volunteers at it. Without the help of volunteers this event would not have been as large and effective as it was.

== Location ==
In 1927 the NACC had its first annual summer event in Indianapolis, Indiana. Since then it was held in 20 other cities across the United States. It was usually held in the Midwest as approximately 85% of the New Testament Churches are in Ohio, Indiana, Kentucky, Illinois, and Missouri. The average attendance was 8,000–12,000 for an average of three and a half nights. When the location was moved outside of the Midwest, attendance dropped as much as 50%.

== Support and partnership ==
Churches and Christian organizations from all across the United States funded the NACC. The supporting churches helped the NACC reach out to people all over the world who come to the event. Donations ranged from $200 a year to more than $30,000 a year. Supporting churches included Discover Christian Church in Dublin, Ohio and Savannah Christian Church in Savannah, Georgia. The NACC also partnered with many Christian colleges such as Atlanta Christian College and Cincinnati Christian University, and other organizations like Good News Production International and CMF International. The NACC raised money and support for the program by holding an exhibition every year.

== Exhibition ==
The exhibition allowed for hundreds of organizations such as churches, radio stations, colleges and other Christian organization to set up booths during the event and share what their school or program had to offer.
