= Clinton Institute =

Clinton Institute may refer to:

- Clinton College (South Carolina), a private historically black Christian college, in South Carolina
- Clinton Institute, a center for the study of the United States and its global relations, at the University College Dublin in Ireland

== See also ==
- Clinton Foundation, a nonprofit organization under section 501(c)(3) of the United States tax code
- Clinton Liberal Institute, a defunct 19th-century preparatory boarding school established by the Universalist Church in Clinton, New York
