= Lincoln Christian University =

Private university in Illinois, 1944–2024

Coordinates: 40°09′25″N 89°21′38″W

- Type: Private university
- Active: 1944–May 31, 2024
- Affiliations: Christian churches and churches of Christ
- President: Silas McCormick
- Administrative staff: 95
- Students: 258 (Fall 2022)
- Location: Lincoln, Illinois, U.S.
- Campus: 130 acres (53 ha)
- Colors: Red, white
- Website: www.lincolnchristian.edu

Lincoln Christian University (LCU) was a private Christian university in Lincoln, Illinois, United States. It maintained extension sites in Normal, Illinois, metropolitan Indianapolis, Indiana, and Las Vegas, Nevada. LCU was affiliated with the Christian churches and churches of Christ.

LCU provided four year, co-educational, Bible college offerings including Bachelor's degrees. LCU's graduate seminary offered Master's degrees (including a Master of Divinity). The university also offered continuing education programs at its various sites and online.

In October 2023, LCU announced that it would cease academic operations on May 31, 2024. It now focuses on non-credit education under the name Lincoln Christian Institute. LCU's president, Silas McCormick, primarily attributed the end of its tenure as a university to a long period of declining enrollment. Ozark Christian College acquired the seminary.

== History ==
LCU was founded in 1944 as Lincoln Bible Institute, a four-year Bible college aligned with the Restoration Movement. Its first president was Earl C Hargrove and its first dean was Enos Dowling. The seminary opened in 1951.

In 1993, LCU became affiliated with Eastern Christian College, which was renamed Lincoln Christian College-East Coast. ECC then closed in 2005 and was absorbed by Mid-Atlantic Christian University.

LCU's most recent construction projects were new athletics facilities in 2006 and new housing in 2007 with ongoing renovation of office and classroom buildings.

In May 2009, officials from then-LCCS announced that the institution would change its name to Lincoln Christian University, effective September 2009.

LCU ceased granting academic degrees and withdrew from accreditation on May 31, 2024. Enrollment had declined from about 1000 students to 537 in Fall 2021 in the decade before the closure. Effective June 1, it adopted the name Lincoln Christian Institute and began focusing on non-credit education for churches and church leaders.

== Athletics ==
At the time of the school's cancellation of the athletic program, Lincoln Christian athletic teams were known as the Red Lions. The university was a member of the National Association of Intercollegiate Athletics (NAIA) as an NAIA Independent within the Continental Athletic Conference from 2014–15 to 2021–22. They were also a member of the National Christian College Athletic Association (NCCAA), primarily competing as an independent in the North Central Region of the Division I level. The Red Lions previously competed as a member of the NCAA Division III ranks, primarily competing in the St. Louis Intercollegiate Athletic Conference (SLIAC) from 2006–07 to the 2007 fall season (2007–08 school year).

Lincoln Christian competed in seven intercollegiate varsity sports: Men's sports included baseball, basketball and soccer; while women's sports included basketball, soccer and volleyball; and co-ed sports included eSports.

The university discontinued its varsity athletics program at the end of the 2022 spring season (2021–22 school year).
