= Stacy Bartlett =

American academic administrator

8th President of Point University
- Incumbent
- Assumed office July 1, 2025
- Preceded by: Dean C. Collins

Personal details
- Children: 2
- Education: Point University

Stacy A. Bartlett is an American academic administrator who is the incoming president of Point University. On February 13, 2025, she was named its eighth president, becoming the first woman to hold the position. She is scheduled to assume office on July 1, 2025.

== Early life and education ==
A native of Metro Atlanta, Bartlett graduated from Point University in 2005. That year, she was the recipient of the Hathcock Award, the highest honor the university bestows on a graduating senior. After graduating from Point, Bartlett earned a Master of Business Administration (MBA) and a doctorate in higher education leadership.

== Career ==
Bartlett has worked for Point University since her graduation in 2005. She began her career as an admission counselor and subsequently served in a variety of roles, including director of admission, vice president of enrollment management, vice president of advancement, and chief advancement and enrollment officer. Most recently, she was the university's chief of staff. As chief of staff, Bartlett oversaw the university's fundraising efforts and the Elevate program, an initiative offering debt-free college degrees to employees in various organizations. Her experience includes enrollment management, fundraising, departmental restructuring, strategic planning, and project management.

In the fall of 2024, Point University began a national presidential search after president Dean C. Collins announced his intention to retire. The university's board of trustees hired the firm FaithSearch Partners to facilitate the process, which began with a pool of over 1,000 individuals. The firm held conversations with 40 candidates, leading to a series of interviews with the search committee. Bartlett was announced as the eight president on February 13, 2025, becoming the first woman to hold the position. Collins will leave office on June 30, 2025, and transition to the role of chancellor, assisting with special projects. Bartlett will assume the presidency on July 1, 2025.

== Personal life ==
Bartlett resides in Senoia, Georgia, with her husband, Jeremiah, and their two daughters. Jeremiah is a 2004 graduate of Point University and works at Southside Church, overseeing digital communications and strategy. Bartlett also serves at Southside Church.
