= Mid-Atlantic Christian University =

Private university in Elizabeth City, North Carolina, US

- Motto: Set for the Defense of the Gospel
- Type: Private university
- Established: 1948
- Religious affiliation: Christian churches and churches of Christ
- President: John W. Maurice
- Faculty: 9
- Administrative staff: 6
- Students: 172 (fall 2023)
- Location: Elizabeth City, North Carolina, U.S. 36.3041°N 76.2168°W
- Nickname: Mustangs
- Sporting affiliations: USCAA – EMAC
- Website: www.macuniversity.edu

Mid-Atlantic Christian University (MACU) is a private Christian university in Elizabeth City, North Carolina, United States. It is supported by Christian churches and churches of Christ, which is part of the Restoration Movement. MACU awards bachelor's degrees, associate degrees, and certificates. MACU started as Roanoke Bible College with the primary goal of preacher training to serve the Church of Christ/Christian Churches of eastern North Carolina and Virginia.

== History ==
MACU North Campus

Mid-Atlantic Christian University was founded as Roanoke Bible College in 1948 by George and Sarah BonDurant to train preachers for churches in eastern North Carolina and the Tidewater region of Virginia. The BonDurants had previously founded Atlanta Christian College in 1937, and George BonDurant served as its first President until 1947, when he left over a dispute with the trustees. He then found employment as an evangelist of the Roanoke District Churches of Christ in eastern North Carolina in 1947.

Less than a year later, the BonDurants founded MACU due to the extreme lack of preachers in the area at the time. Classes began in 1948 with 12 full-time students. The first group of transfer students graduated in 1950 and the first class to complete all four years at MACU graduated in 1952. MACU has graduated a class every year since.

MACU has been accredited by the Association for Biblical Higher Education since 1979. It has been accredited by the Southern Association of Colleges and Schools since 1999.

MACU absorbed the remaining funds, library holdings, and equipment of Eastern Christian College when it closed in 2005 after nearly 60 years of operation. Eastern's academic records are now archived at MACU.

MACU officially changed its name to Mid-Atlantic Christian University in the summer of 2009. Enrollment at MACU reached 178 students in the fall semester of 2010.

On October 3, 2010, sophomore Jonathan Schipper was shot to death in his room in the Pearl A. Presley Hall, bringing MACU national news attention. The school's official policy does not allow guns on campus. This is the only violent crime ever reported on MACU's campus. Fellow student Christopher Amyx, a part-time police officer, was later convicted of first-degree murder in 2013.

=== Presidents ===
- George W. BonDurant (1948–1986)
- William A. Griffin (1986–2006)
- D. Clay Perkins (2006–2017)
- John Maurice (2017 - current)

== Academics ==
The university offers Bachelor of Theology, Bachelor of Arts, and Bachelor of Science degrees. All students major in biblical studies, and can double major in Applied Linguistics, Cross-Cultural Ministry, General Ministry, Leadership & Administration, Preaching, or Youth and Family Ministry. MACU added a military science minor through Army ROTC in 2010.

MACU has agreements with Elizabeth City State University and College of the Albemarle allowing dual enrollment.

== Athletics ==
Mid-Atlantic Christian (MACU) athletic teams are known as the Mustangs. The university is a member of the United States Collegiate Athletic Association (USCAA; which they joined since December 2012) primarily competing as a founding member of the Eastern Metro Athletic Conference (EMAC) since the 2018–19 academic year.

MACU currently fields seven varsity sports: Men's sports include basketball, baseball, golf and soccer; while women's sports include basketball, soccer and volleyball.

MACU also has intramural sports that vary by semester. These have included flag football, basketball, volleyball, kickball, wiffle ball, and many more. There are also tournaments played among the students in the lobbies utilizing the pool table, ping pong table and foosball table.

== Campus ==
Heritage Hall

Albert C. Blanton III Campus Life Center

The MACU campus is located on the Pasquotank River, less than a mile from downtown Elizabeth City, North Carolina. East and West campuses are divided by North Poindexter Street.

=== West Campus ===
- Wilkinson Hall, original building: administration
- Faith Hall, 1951: faculty offices
- Heritage Hall, 1965: classrooms and cafeteria

=== East Campus ===
- Pearl A. Presley Hall, 1976: women's dormitory
- Harold C. Turner Hall, 1985: men's dormitory, student center and coffee shop
- Albert C. Blanton III Campus Life Center, 1998: Watson-Griffin Library, Chesson Gymnasium, and Davenport Chapel

=== North Campus ===
- Park, recreational, and picnic area

== Traditions ==
=== Sneak Day ===
Every year during the fall semester, the seniors organize a "Sneak Day". They wake up the rest of the students shortly after 5:00 AM and take them to a secret location off campus for a day of fun and relaxation. Faculty and staff are unaware of the exact date of Sneak Day until they find no one attending morning classes. Sneak day is now officially recognized in the student handbook.

=== Alumni Rally & Homecoming ===
MACU's annual Alumni Rally & Homecoming has been held in Elizabeth City every year since 1949. It takes place in March and has been on MACU's campus since 1999. Typical rallies include an alumni basketball game, praise and worship sessions, and a variety of speaking sessions.

== Notable alumni ==
As of 2010, over 3,000 students have attended MACU and 1,140 have graduated. The school's notable alumni include:

- William A. Griffin BA 1962, former president of MACU
- Ajai Lall BA 1982, Christian missionary to India; founder of Central India Christian Mission
- Barry McCarty BA 1975, national radio host; former president of Cincinnati Christian University
