= James Edward Smith =

James Edward Smith may refer to:

- James Edward Smith (botanist), English botanist and founder of the Linnean Society
- James Edward Smith (murderer), American murderer
- James Edward Smith (politician), Canadian businessman and mayor of Toronto
- James E. Smith (biblical scholar), American biblical scholar
- James Smith (New South Wales politician), member of the New South Wales Legislative Assembly

== See also ==
- James Smith (disambiguation)
