= Ajai Lall =

Indian missionary

Ajai Lall is a Christian preacher and missionary in India. He is the founder and first Executive Director of Central India Christian Mission. Lall is associated with the Christian churches and churches of Christ, which is part of the Restoration Movement.

== Early life and education ==
Ajai Lall was born and raised in India. Before coming to the United States, Lall had earned a degree in criminal law from the University of Sagar with the intention of becoming a lawyer. He was influenced by his father, Vijai Lall, and sensed the call from God to serve the humanity, that led him to become a preacher instead. He graduated from Mid-Atlantic Christian University, in 1982. He then returned to India and earned a MA in Humanities and a PhD in Public Administration from the University of Sagar. In addition, he has studied at Dallas Christian College and Cincinnati Christian University.

== Central India Christian Mission ==
Lall and his wife, Indu, founded Central India Christian Mission in 1982, with Lall serving as its executive director. As of 2009, Central India Christian Mission had over 800 employees, and had started a 140-bed hospital, a nursing college, a publication ministry, Children's ministry, and Bible Colleges, mostly in India. Lall makes frequently visits the United States for speaking in conferences, conventions, universities and churches. He founded The Atma Vikas Sanstha to train thousands of people for various trades in order to become self-supporting.

== Other activities ==
Lall gave the keynote address at the 2008 North American Christian Convention in Cincinnati, Ohio. Lall was also appointed by the Prime Minister of India to its National Youth Council and has authored four books in Hindi. He currently is President of the World Convention of Churches of Christ.

Preceded by None	Executive Director of Central India Christian Mission; 1982–current	Succeeded by Incumbent
