= Nazarene Bible Quizzing =

Nazarene Bible Quizzing (also known as "Youth Quizzing", "Teen Quizzing", or "Bible Quizzing Ministry") is a program for discipleship targeted to children aged 12–18 or in grades 6–12 in the United States or Canada. Some 5th graders are regularly allowed to participate, and 4th graders are allowed to participate in rare circumstances. Nazarene Bible Quizzing emphasizes Scripture memorization and application, uses a form of Bible quiz competition for 6th–12th grade children all over the world, and is sponsored by the Church of the Nazarene.

In Nazarene Bible Quizzing, two or three teams made of up to five members compete against each other with participants jumping off of a chair to answer a question. The jumping triggers an electronic lockout device in the seat, and only the first person to jump may answer the question. Should someone jump before the question is completed, he/she must finish the question and give the answer. In this respect, the competition is similar to other Christian denominational Bible quiz ministries.

Each year, the material is chosen from a predetermined list of books in the New Testament. Within each eight-year cycle, Nazarene Bible Quizzing covers over half of the New Testament.

== Types of questions ==
There are eight different types of questions, as follows:

- General: A basic question (who, what, where, when, why, how, and so on).
- According To: The question provides a reference and a specific question from the verse, such as, "According to Luke chapter 9 verse 60, what should the dead do?".
- Situation: Asks multiple questions from a single quotation, such as, "Who said it and to whom, 'Do not be afraid, Zechariah, your prayer has been heard'?".
- In What Book and Chapter: The question provides a scripture quotation and the quizzer must answer with the book and chapter of the quotation.
- Context: Asks a question out of the context of a verse. This is the only time a question can come from a footnote.
- Quote: The reference of a memory verse or passage is provided and the quizzer must quote it from memory. The quotation must be word perfect.
- Finish the Verse: The question provides the first couple words of a memory verse or passage and the quizzer must complete the quotation, word perfect.
- Reference: The question provides the first couple words of a memory verse or passage and the quizzer must finish and give the reference, word perfect.

Each round consists of 20 question: 11 general questions, 4 according-to questions and 1 question from each of the 5 remaining categories – which depend on the predetermined books studied. "Situation" questions are only used when there is only one book being studied – otherwise, "In What Book and Chapter" questions are used in the years where the letters are being studied (Hebrews and 1 and 2 Peter, Romans and James, 1 and 2 Corinthians, Galatians-Ephesians-Philippians-Colossians-Philemon).

== The quiz cycle ==
The current quiz cycle is determined by the World Bible Quizzing Association and repeats every eight years:

1. Hebrews, 1 Peter, and 2 Peter^{Q}
2. Matthew^{N}
3. Romans and James^{Q}
4. Acts^{G}
5. Galatians, Ephesians, Philippians, Colossians, and Philemon^{Q}
6. Luke^{N}
7. 1 Corinthians and 2 Corinthians^{Q}
8. John^{G}

Notes

^Q Nationals are held at a Q event, hosted by one of the Nazarene Universities (every other year)
^G Nationals are held at the General Assembly of the Nazarene Conference (every four years)
^N Nationals are held at the Nazarene Youth Conference (every four years)

== Levels of competition ==
Official Nazarene Bible quizzes can be placed in two categories. National Track quizzes have a direct bearing on Nationals competitions, and Non-National Track do not have a direct bearing on Nationals qualification.

There are National Track competitions at the following levels:

Districts – This is the basic officially sanctioned level of quizzing. Local teams attend monthly meets in order to practice and to give their quizzers the opportunity to qualify for the end-of-the-year regional quiz. Normally, the top ten quizzers from the final district meet are sent in two separate teams (A and B) to the regional quiz. District meets tend to be fairly casual and laid-back, providing low-pressure quizzing that allows quizzers to make mistakes and get feedback. District meets also allow quizzers to meet new people that attend nearby churches and make new friends.

Fields – This event consists of teams from the same region. The United States has eight fields (formerly called regions), each being associated with one of the Nazarene Universities located in the United States. Quizzers qualify for field-level competition based on the final meet in their district, which typically takes place in March or April. Teams first play in a round-robin tournament, then the 16 quizzers (10 or 24 in some fields) with the best scores compete in a quiz-off. The top ten quizzers from the quiz-off are again split into two separate teams (A and B) and sent to Nationals. After the quiz-off, district teams compete in a double-elimination tournament to decide a Field Champion. This has no bearing on the teams that attend Nationals. Typically, 80 quizzers from among all the regions will qualify to quiz at Nationals. However, this can vary slightly if a Field only brings one team, eleven quizzers, or if a team from a field outside of the United States (usually an Asia-Pacific team consisting of missionary youth) join Nationals.

Nationals – Nationals take place at the General Assembly of the Nazarene Conference or at the Nazarene Youth Conference (these events are held once every two years and alternate so that each event occurs only once every four years), as well as at a Q event held at one of the Nazarene Universities. The top quizzers from English-speaking countries compete. The top quizzers are chosen through one of the eight field competitions that occur in March, April, and May. The field teams normally participate in a double round robin tournament, receive seedings ranging from 1 to 8, and then participate in a double-elimination tournament. At the end of the quizzing, the teams are ranked 1–8, A-division quizzers 1–40, and the B-division quizzers 1–40 (41–80 if considered on an A/B combined scale). A Q event also includes quizzes for local churches and districts. Teams that participate in these quizzes compete in either the novice or the experienced division. The General Assembly and Nazarene Youth Conference events only hold the field-level competition.

Non-National Track quizzes are of two styles:

Invitational – This quiz meet style does not mean that all teams require an invitation but that some qualification process is required to attend. The only true Non-National invitational is the St. Louis Top Ten. This quiz can only be attended by the A and B teams from a district. It is notable because it is the only Non-National competition that discourages local church teams from attending and encourages A and B district teams to attend. It is always held in early December, halfway through the season. The Tri-State Invitational tournament is similar to a true invitational because any team that is not located on the Mount Vernon Nazarene University Field that wishes to compete must be invited based on performances at other tournaments and at Q events. A team will typically play against the 8 or 9 other teams in its randomly assigned division. All of the teams are then sorted into new divisions based on their records such that they play against teams of similar skill during the tournament. Each new division has a round-robin tournament, and the top-three teams from each new division are given awards. Individual quizzers are ranked and awarded based on their performance in the pre-tournament rounds.

Tournament – This quiz meet style is similar to an invitational but is open to quizzers and teams of all skill levels and abilities. This level of competition allows experienced quizzers to compete with others of the same caliber from around the country. Most tournaments tend to host teams from 2–4 different regions. Like invitationals, tournaments use divisional round-robins to determine seeding for the afternoon tournament. Unlike invitationals, tournaments tend to use elimination-style competition rather than round robins to determine the winning teams. Also, District A and B teams, or "cup teams", are strictly forbidden from quizzing at these events. However, churches can combine teams under extenuating circumstances.

== See also ==
- Bible quiz
