= Fair Meadows =

Fair Meadows may refer to:

- Fair Meadows (Creswell, Maryland), listed on the NRHP in Maryland
- Fair Meadows Race Track, Tulsa, Oklahoma
