= Cincinnati Christian University =

Christian university in Ohio, U.S.

- Former names: Cincinnati Bible College and Seminary
- Type: Private university
- Active: 1924–2019
- Religious affiliation: Christian Churches and Churches of Christ
- Students: ~350
- Location: Cincinnati, Ohio, U.S. 39°06′45″N 84°33′17″W
- Campus: Urban
- Colors
- Nickname: Eagles
- Sporting affiliations: NAIA and RSC
- Website: www.ccuniversity.edu

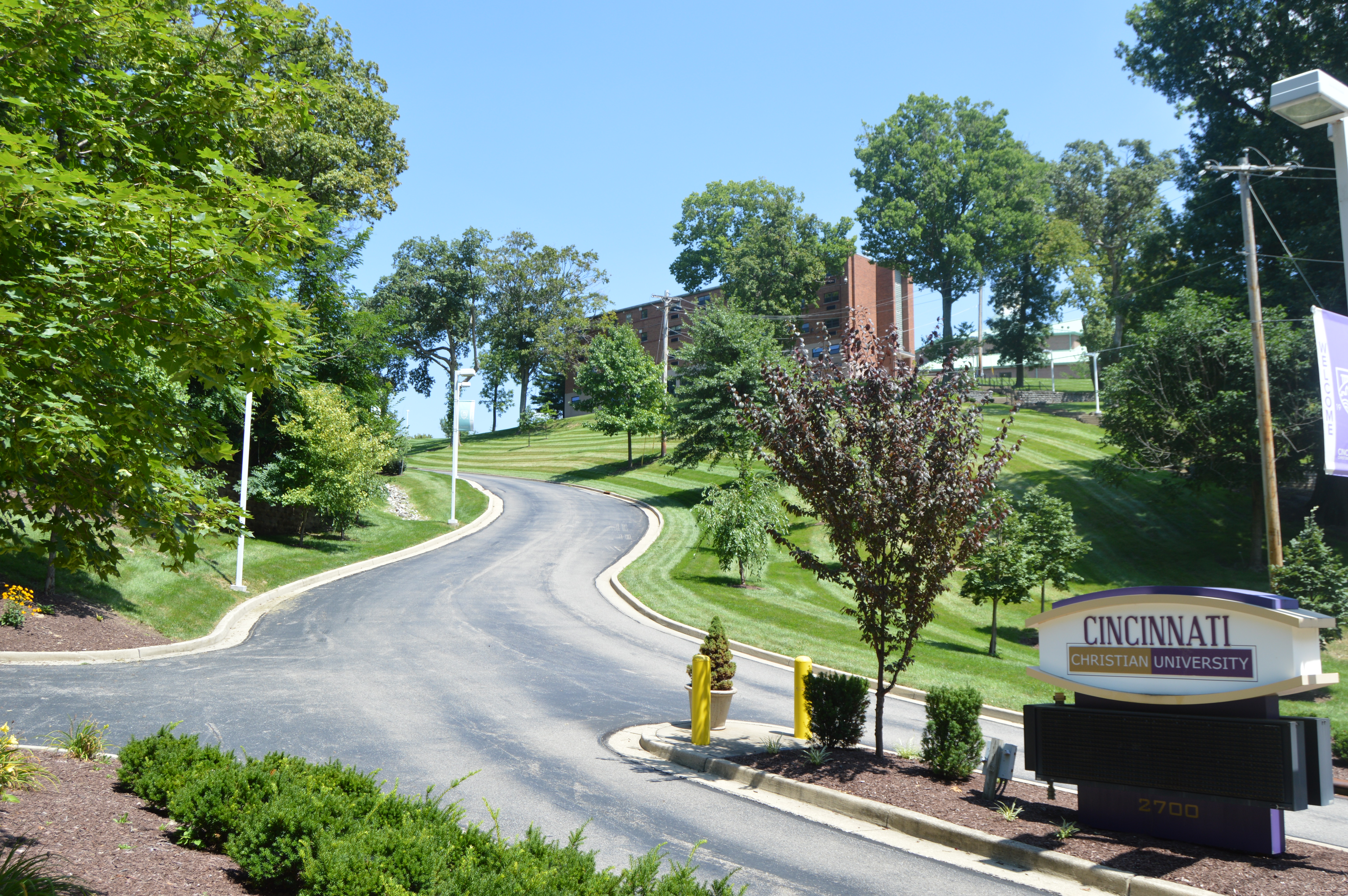
Main entrance to CCU's campus from Glenway Avenue

Cincinnati Christian University (CCU) was a private Christian university in Cincinnati, Ohio, United States. CCU was supported by the Christian Churches and Churches of Christ, which are part of the Restoration Movement. The university was accredited by the Higher Learning Commission (HLC), it was placed on "show-cause" status in the summer of 2019 and given one year to convince the accreditor that it should remain accredited. On October 28, 2019, the university's board of trustees announced the decision to shut down the degree programs at the conclusion of the fall 2019 semester and withdrew from the HLC.

== Campus ==
The university's main campus was located in one of Cincinnati's western neighborhoods just a few miles west of downtown, but classes were also offered at extension sites in Sharonville, Ohio, and in Indianapolis. In 2009, CCU began offering classes in Jeffersonville, Indiana, and in the Greater Louisville area. However, these class offerings in Ohio, Indiana, and Kentucky ceased at an unknown time. Also, beginning in 2018, CCU partnered with Point University, which added approximately 30 degree programs to be offered to students online.

== Organization ==
The university was structured into five schools:

- Biblical Studies, Arts, and Sciences
- Ministry
- Education and Behavioral Sciences
- Business
- Adult Learning

== Academics ==
Cincinnati Christian University offered Bachelor's degrees and Master's degrees. The university was accredited by the Higher Learning Commission (HLC) but was placed on "show-cause" status in July 2019 and given one year to convince HLC that it should remain accredited. On October 28, 2019, Cincinnati Christian University announced that they would be withdrawing from the Higher Learning Commission. The university's accreditation was threatened by alleged conflicts of interest on the part of the university's president who also serves on the university's board of trustees and is an officer in the institution's primary lending bank, Central Bank.

CCU was a member of the Greater Cincinnati Consortium of Colleges and Universities, an organization including all of the accredited colleges and universities in the area. This consortium relationship gave students access to course offerings of the other institutions through a cross-registration arrangement as well as access to library resources of the other schools in the consortium.

CCU was a member of the Association of Schools of Jerusalem University College (formerly known as the Institute of Holy Land Studies) and was approved to offer the Master of Arts in Counseling program by the Ohio Counseling and Social Worker Board. The Master of Arts in Counseling degree was pre-approved as a qualifying degree for licensure as a professional counselor by the State of Ohio Counselor, Social Worker, and Marriage & Family Therapist Board. The Department of Behavioral Sciences was approved under The Council for Accreditation of Counseling and Related Educational Programs (CACREP).

== Athletics ==
The Cincinnati Christian (CCU) athletic teams were called the Eagles. The university was a member of the National Association of Intercollegiate Athletics (NAIA), primarily competed in the River States Conference (RSC; formerly known as the Kentucky Intercollegiate Athletic Conference (KIAC) until after 2015–16) from 2008–09 to the fall semester of the 2019–20 school year. They were also a member of the National Christian College Athletic Association (NCCAA), primarily competing as an independent in the Midwest Region of the Division I level.

CCU competed in 17 intercollegiate varsity team: Men's sports included baseball, basketball, cross country, football, golf, soccer, track & field and volleyball; while women's sports included basketball, cross country, golf, soccer, softball, track & field and volleyball; and co-ed sports include archery and eSports.

=== Discontinuation ===
On October 29, 2019, CCU announced that fall semester sports were discontinued since Cincinnati Christian closed at the end of the semester.

== Notable alumni ==
- George W. BonDurant BA 1936, founder and former president of Atlanta Christian College and Mid-Atlantic Christian University.
- Terry Bradds BA 1980, jazz guitarist.
- Dan Burton, member of United States House of Representatives from Indiana.
- Jack Cottrell BA 1959, theologian and author.
- David Faust MA, M.Div. (date unknown), author, writer for The Lookout and seventh president of CCU.
- William A. Griffin MA 1979, former president of Mid-Atlantic Christian University.
- Rich Mullins, Christian musician.
- Michael A. O'Donnell MA 1983, former professor of Family Studies and founding executive director of the Southwest Center for Fathering at Abilene Christian University.
- James E. Smith, Biblical scholar and professor at Johnson University Florida.
- Mindy Smith, singer/songwriter.
- James D. Strauss, theologian.

== Presidents ==
| President | Term |
|---|---|
| Ralph Records | 1928–1948 |
| Woodrow Perry | 1948–1970 |
| Harvey C. Bream Jr. | 1970–1986 |
| Ron Geary | 1986–1988 |
| Dr. Barry McCarty | 1988–1993 |
| Dr. David Grubbs | 1993–2002 |
| Dr. David Faust | 2002–2014 |
| Ken Tracy | 2014–2015 |
| Dr. David Ray (Interim) | 2015–2017 |
| Ronald E. Heineman | 2019 |

On November 11, 2015, the Board of Trustees of Cincinnati Christian University announced the appointment of Dr. David Ray as the university's interim president.

Ronald E. Heineman became the final president of the university sometime around January 2019.
