= National Bible Bowl =

U.S. organization that administers youth bible quizzing programs

National Bible Bowl is a 501(c) non-profit organization which is responsible for the administration of two nationwide Bible quizzing programs for youth in grades 3 to 12. There are about 40 teams in United States who all study the same portion of Scripture during the competition season. Teams compete monthly from September to November and March to May on the local level, and in December and June many of these teams travel to a mini National Bible Bowl Tournament. Top achievers are awarded trophies and scholarships to Christian and Bible colleges.

== Mission statement ==
Bible Bowl creates an atmosphere that enhances knowledge of God's Word, Christian character, community, and discipleship.

== History and affiliation ==
National Bible Bowl is affiliated with the Christian churches and churches of Christ, a branch of the Restoration Movement. From 1964 to 2001, the Bible Bowl program was administered by the North American Christian Convention. National Bible Bowl became an independent non-profit organization in 2001, and now administers both the Teen Bible Bowl program, and also the Beginner Bible Bowl program.

== Age divisions ==
Bible Bowl is for youth in grades 6 to 12. The Beginner Bible Bowl program is for children in grades 3 to 5.

== Study text ==
The Teen Bible Bowl study text is a portion of Scripture from either the Old or New Testament. The text for the coming year is announced in April, prior to the current National Tournament. Competition questions are not published in advance of the competitions, although practice questions are available.

The Beginner Bible Bowl study text is usually the same as (or a sub-set of) the Teen Bible Bowl study text (although some years it is completely different). The questions for Beginner Bible Bowl are published in advance, although the exact wording of the questions in competition is not published in advance. This mechanism prevents teams from simply memorizing the questions instead of focusing on the verse content. However, as of the 2014–2015 season, there are no longer pre-published questions.

Study texts for each year are published through the National Bible Bowl office. They also offer a variety of study materials to help students in learning the text. Materials are available for both Teen Bible Bowl and Beginner Bible Bowl.

== Competition ==
Local Competition: The year of competition begins in September, when around 8 local "round robin" competitions are held in various locations nationwide. These local competitions continue through the school year, with one competition per month from September to November and March to May. These local competitions are administered by independent organizations on the local level.

National Competition: A mini National Bible Bowl Tournament is held in December and again in June. Over 30 teams compete for the chance to be named National Bible Bowl Champion.

The National Tournament consists of an Individual Written Achievement Test, a Quote-Bee, Round Robin competition, and the main Double Elimination Tournament.

For Beginner Bible Bowl, the National Tournament consists of Round Robin competition and the main Double Elimination Tournament. However, 2014 was the last Nationals for Beginner Bowl.

Competition Questions: Up until 2001, each coach was required to write a "set" of questions for each competition. Now, all competition questions are produced by the National Bible Bowl Office. The National Bible Bowl Office is responsible for coordinating the writing, editing, and nationwide distribution (by internet) of over 10,000 competition questions annually.

== The game ==
The quizzing method is modelled after the television show Jeopardy. The score is kept, and the team with the highest score at the end of the game wins.

Because the game was originally developed for television, they are fast-paced, exciting, and more audience friendly than other Bible quizzing games.

The toss-up question: All players have the opportunity to answer the toss-up question. The first player to buzz in with the correct answer is awarded points for his team. Only the player who buzzes in can answer the toss-up question; there can be no team consultation. There is no deduction of points for missed questions.

Time limit: The Game lasts until time runs out or until all questions prepared for the game have been read- whichever comes first. There is no half-time in round robin play. There is a timekeeper for each game to make sure the game does not go over the time limit.

Contentions: In Teen Bible Bowl players are allowed to contest questions or answers that they do not find to be correct. If a toss-up is contested, time is stopped and the player proves his contention at that time. If a bonus is contested, the contention is settled at half time or the end of the game. All contentions must be proven by the player to the quizmaster using the Bible Bowl text or another official Bible Bowl resource. Quizmasters may consult a judge or another quizmaster for difficult rulings. Contentions are not allowed in Beginner Bible Bowl.
