= CICM =

CICM most commonly refers to:

- CICM Missionaries, a Roman Catholic missionary religious congregation of men established in 1862

CICM may also refer to:

- Chartered Institute of Credit Management, a United Kingdom-based professional body representing credit professionals
- Central India Christian Mission, a Christian missionary organization in India
- Chulabhorn International College of Medicine, a medical school located in Thailand
- College of Intensive Care Medicine, also known as College of Intensive Care Medicine of Australia and New Zealand
