= David L. Eubanks =

American university president

David Lawson Eubanks
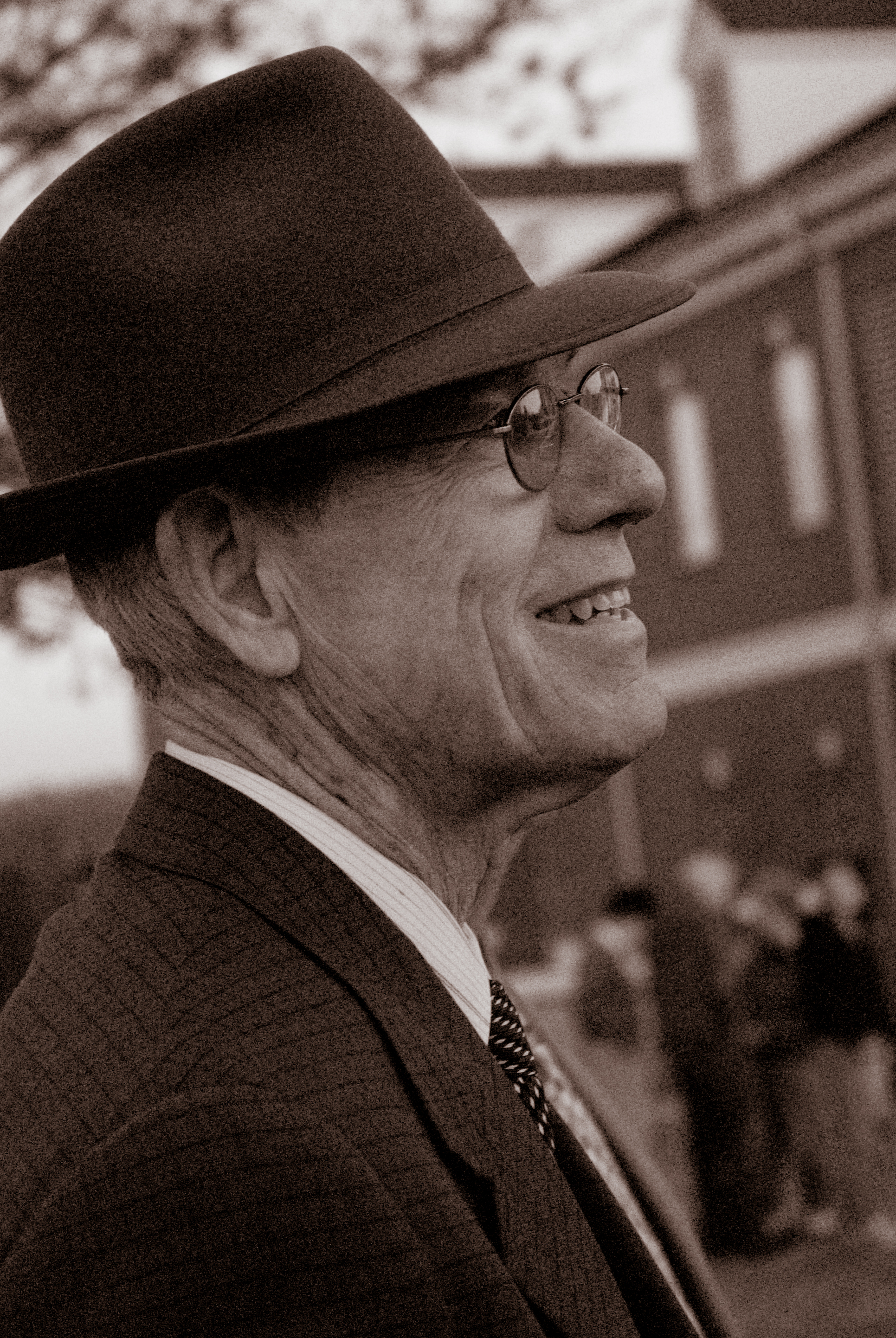
- Dr. David L. Eubanks, 5th President of Johnson Bible College, in his trademark hat.

5th President of Johnson Bible College
- In office 1969–2007
- Preceded by: Robert M. Bell
- Succeeded by: Gary E. Weedman

Personal details
- Born: November 18, 1935 (age 89)

David L. Eubanks (born November 18, 1935) is an American preacher associated with the Restoration Movement of Christianity. Eubanks was the fifth President of Johnson Bible College, serving from 1969 to 2007, which ranks him among the longest serving college presidents in the U.S.

== Early life and education ==
Eubanks grew up in Maryville, Tennessee. He graduated from Johnson Bible College in 1957 and later earned a Ph.D. in History from the University of Tennessee.

== Johnson Bible College ==
Eubanks became the President of Johnson Bible College in 1969. He held the office until his retirement in 2007, but has remained with the college as an advisor. His term was marked by unprecedented admissions and campus growth. Nine buildings were constructed and between 1969 and 2007 admissions nearly doubled. Under Eubanks's leadership, the college received its first regional accreditation from the Southern Association of Colleges and Schools in 1979. Graduate programs were also added during his tenure.

== Other activities ==
David Eubanks served as the President of the 1984 North American Christian Convention in Atlanta, Georgia.

On March 22, 2013, Dr. Eubanks was named chief operating officer of Florida Christian College in order to oversee the merger between Florida Christian College and Johnson University.

Preceded by Robert M. Bell	President of Johnson Bible College; 1969—2007	Succeeded by Gary E. Weedman
