= P. H. Welshimer =

American theologian

Pearl Howard "P. H." Welshimer (April 6, 1873 – August 16, 1957) was an American Christian minister and author from Canton, Ohio, and well-known leader in the Restoration Movement.

Pearl Welshimer was born to Samuel and Louisa Jane Wilson Welshimer at Union Center, Union County, Ohio, on April 6, 1873. As a boy he selected for himself the middle name "Howard." In his adult years he was most often known simply as "P.H."

Welshimer graduated from Ohio Northern University at Ada in 1894. In his final year of school there, university president Henry Lehr pulled Welshimer aside and urged him to abandon the study of law for the ministry. As a result, Welshimer attended Hiram College to study preaching. After graduating from Hiram in 1897, Welshimer accepted a call to a church in Millersburg, Ohio.

Welshimer met his wife, Clara Hornig, in Millersburg. The two were married in her parents’ home in Vermilion, Ohio, on May 15, 1900. They had three children: Helen, Mildred (Phillips), and Ralph.

Welshimer resigned from the pulpit in Millersburg to accept a call from the First Christian Church of Canton, Ohio, on January 1, 1902. He stayed at this church for the rest of his life. Under Welshimer's guidance, the Canton congregation became one of the largest Christian Church congregations in the country, especially well known for the unusual methods Welshimer used to attract people to worship and the success of its Sunday School program. Welshimer himself published a number of books, sermons, articles, and tracts. He was also a highly sought-after speaker, a member of the Commission on Restudy, president of the short-lived Phillips Bible Institute, as well as an active member and thrice president of the North American Christian Convention.

P. H. Welshimer died August 16, 1957. In October 1957, Harold L. Davis was chosen as the successor to Dr. Welshimer. Mr. Davis served as P.H.’s assistant for four years and would serve for 12 years until 1969.

== Bibliography ==
- Arant, Francis M., "P.H." – the Welshimer story, Cincinnati, OH: Standard Publishing Foundation, 1958
- Foster, Douglas A., Encyclopedia of the Stone-Campbell Movement, Grand Rapids, MI: Eerdmans Publishing Company, 2004
- P. H. Welshimer, Facts Concerning the New Testament Church, Standard Publishing Company, 1996
