= Shepherd Church =

Coordinates: 34.2743°N 118.5633°W

- Shepherd Of The Hills-Hillcrest Christian Church
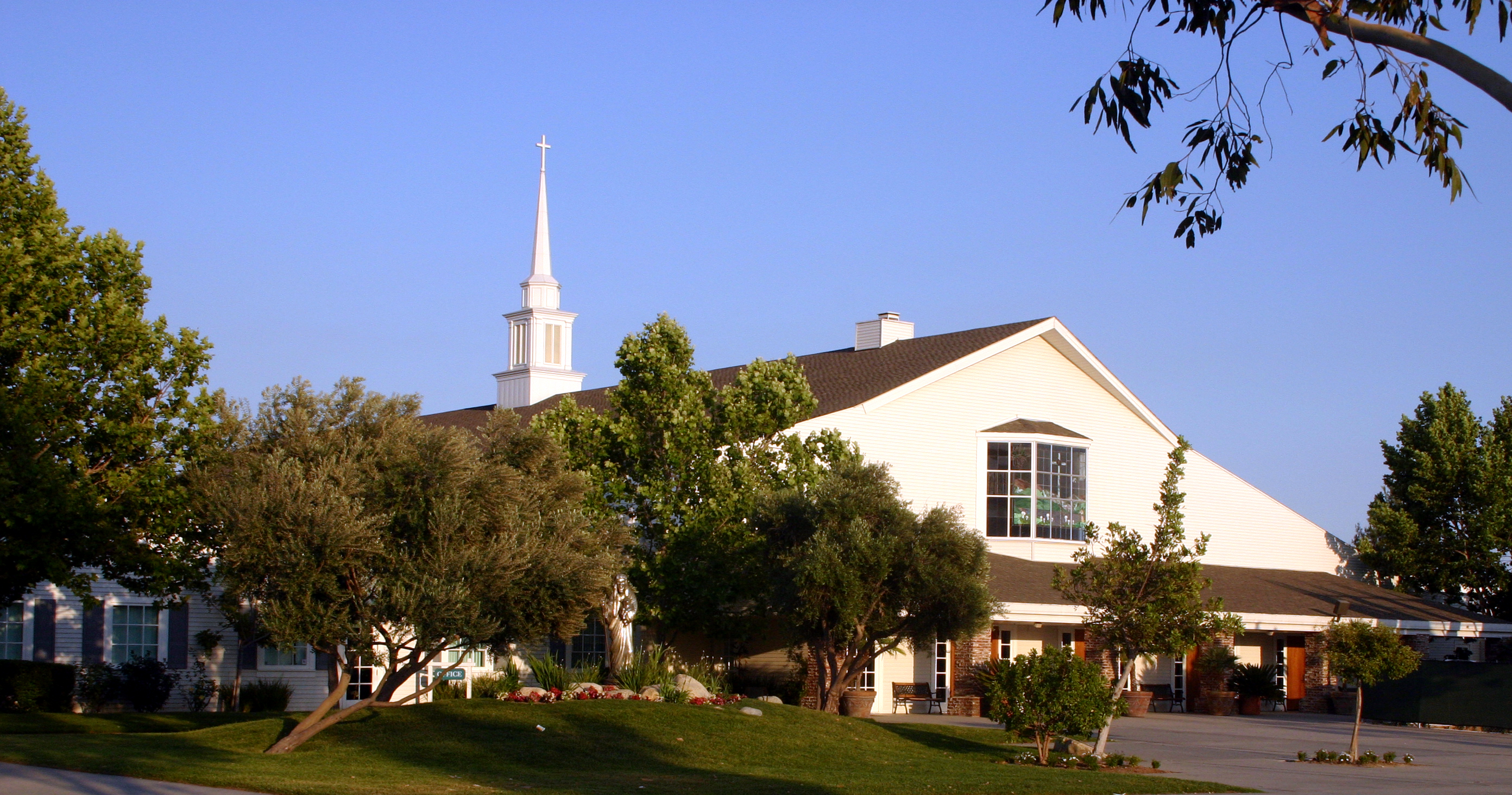
- The old sanctuary of Shepherd Church, Porter Ranch, CA
- Shepherd Church
- Country: USA
- Denomination: Non-denominational
- Website: http://www.theshepherd.org/

History
- Founded: 1995

Shepherd Church is a nondenominational megachurch based in Porter Ranch, Los Angeles, California, USA. The senior pastor is Dudley Rutherford.

== History ==
In 1977, around 300 congregants from the First Baptist Church of Van Nuys left the church and organized Faith Evangelical Church in Chatsworth, CA, later to be known as the Church at Rocky Peak. Pastor Harold Fickett Jr, former pastor of the Van Nuys church until 1975, returned to briefly pastor the small congregation from 1978 to 1981.

During this time, Pastor Jess Moody and the First Baptist Church of Van Nuys moved out of their building, having finalized its sale to The Church on the Way in 1988. The church began meeting in a few temporary venues under the name "Shepherd of the Hills," though the church remained baptist, having recently joined the Southern Baptist Convention. In 1990, the church acquired a larger property in Porter Ranch, and in 1991, construction was finished on its now historic, ranch-style building. However, due to a decline in membership and increased debt, as well as Pastor Moody's impending retirement, the church started looking to merge with another.

Just as the Van Nuys church was selling its building in 1987, Pastor Dudley Rutherford was appointed at a small church in Granada Hills named Hillcrest Christian Church. Over the next several years, the church experienced considerable growth and began outgrowing its building.

In 1995, after the Church at Rocky Peak turned down a merger with Shepherd of the Hills, Hillcrest Christian Church agreed to merge with Shepherd of the Hills, with the Granada Hills congregation moving to the Porter Ranch building and renting out the Granada Hills building, while Pastor Moody retired and was succeeded by Pastor Rutherford.

In 2010, the church opened campuses in Porter Ranch and Woodland Hills.

In 2017, it opened a new 3,500-seat auditorium at its main site.

According to a church census released in 2022, it claimed a weekly attendance of 6,162 people.

== See also ==
- List of megachurches in the United States
