= Eastern Metro Athletic Conference =

- Association: USCAA
- Founded: 2018
- Ceased: 2022
- Sports fielded: 5; men's: 2; women's: 3
- No. of teams: 6
- Headquarters: Charlotte, North Carolina

The Eastern Metro Athletic Conference (EMAC) was a Division I conference of the United States Collegiate Athletic Association (USCAA). The conference consisted of schools from North Carolina, South Carolina, and Virginia. The conference hosted its first championships in the 2018–19 season.

== History ==
Founding members of the conference included Johnson and Wales (Charlotte), Mid-Atlantic Christian University, The Apprentice School, and Warren Wilson College. Clinton College was added as a founding member once the college was accepted into USCAA membership, bringing the inaugural membership up to five for the 2018–19 season. Warren Wilson left USCAA and the conference to join NCAA Division III starting for the 2020–21 season. On November 8, 2021, the EMAC announced that Regent University would be joining the conference effective immediately.

The EMAC ceased operations when Apprentice and MACU announced they were leaving to join the New South Athletic Conference in 2022. Clinton also left the USCAA and the conference to join NCCAA for 2022–23 season.

== Member schools ==
=== Final members ===
At its peak, the EMAC had six full members; all were private schools:

Institution	Location	Founded	Affiliation	Enrollment	Nickname	Joined	Left
Clinton College	Rock Hill, South Carolina	1894	AME Zion	200	Golden Bears	2018–19	2021–22
Johnson & Wales University–Charlotte	Charlotte, North Carolina	2004	Nonsectarian	1,700	Wildcats	2018–19	2021–22
Mid-Atlantic Christian University	Elizabeth City, North Carolina	1948	Christian Churches	220	Mustangs	2018–19	2021–22
Regent University	Virginia Beach, Virginia	1977	Christian	4,400	Royals	2021–22	2021–22
The Apprentice School	Newport News, Virginia	1919	Vocational	750	Builders	2018–19	2021–22
Warren Wilson College	Swannanoa, North Carolina	1894	Presbyterian	750	Owls	2018–19	2020–21

== Conference sports ==
Conference sports
Sport	Men's	Women's
Basketball	✓	✓
Soccer	✓	✓
Volleyball		✓
