= William A. Griffin (Christian churches and churches of Christ) =

American preacher

William A. Griffin is an American preacher associated with the Restoration Movement of Christianity. He was the second President of Mid-Atlantic Christian University (known as Roanoke Bible College until 2009), serving from 1986 to 2006. Griffin was awarded the Order of the Long Leaf Pine in 2010.

== Early life and education ==
Griffin was raised in the Christian churches and churches of Christ in Hyde County, North Carolina. He was significantly influenced by the impact that Mid-Atlantic Christian University had on eastern North Carolina, greatly increasing the number of preachers in the region. Griffin graduated from Mid-Atlantic Christian University in 1962 and later returned as an instructor. He became dean of students in 1975. He also completed degrees at East Carolina University, Cincinnati Christian University, and The College of William and Mary.

== Mid-Atlantic Christian University ==
Griffin became the President of Mid-Atlantic Christian University in 1986, following the retirement of George W. BonDurant. His term was marked by significant expansions in campus facilities and Academic programs offered. Under Griffin's leadership, Mid-Atlantic Christian University received its first regional accreditation from the Southern Association of Colleges and Schools in 1999. Griffin was also successful in increasing fund raising. Griffin resigned in 2006, but continued to serve as a professor and advisor for the university. He supported the university's name change in 2009.

Griffin was awarded the Order of the Long Leaf Pine on March 18, 2010, by North Carolina Governor Bev Perdue for his work at Mid-Atlantic Christian University and his contributions to the state.

== Other activities ==
Continuing his passion for preaching, Griffin still organizes preaching for churches without preachers in North Carolina and eastern Virginia.

Griffin and his wife have operated an embroidery business since 2007.

Preceded by George W. BonDurant	President of Mid-Atlantic Christian University; 1986—2006	Succeeded by D. Clay Perkins
