= Eastern Christian College =

Private college in Bel Air, Maryland, US

Eastern Christian College or ECC was a co-educational, private Christian college that was located in Bel Air, Maryland, United States. It was supported by Christian Churches and Churches of Christ, which is part of the Restoration Movement.

== History ==
Eastern Christian College was established in 1946 as Eastern Christian Institute in East Orange, New Jersey. It moved to its final location in Bel Air, Maryland in 1960 and was renamed Eastern Christian College. Its history was marked by significant financial struggles. ECC merged with Lincoln Christian University in 1993 and was renamed Lincoln Christian College East Coast in an attempt to stabilize its fiscal troubles. While marginally successful, ECC ceased operations and closed in 2005. Its remaining funds, library holdings, and equipment were absorbed by Mid-Atlantic Christian University. A plurality of the active students also transferred to Mid-Atlantic Christian University.

== Campus ==
ECC's former Bel Air campus was located on the Fair Meadows estate, which is listed on the National Register of Historical Places.

== Academics ==
Eastern Christian College awarded Bachelor's and Associate's degrees during its operation. Its academic records are now archived at Mid-Atlantic Christian University.
