= George W. BonDurant =

American preacher and academic administrator

George William BonDurant (August 9, 1915 – July 11, 2017) was an American preacher influential in the Restoration Movement of Christianity during the 20th century. He was the founder and first president of both Atlanta Christian College and Mid-Atlantic Christian University. BonDurant was awarded the Order of the Long Leaf Pine in 2009.

== Early life and education ==
BonDurant attended Columbia University for one year before transferring to Cincinnati Christian University. He graduated from Cincinnati Christian University in 1936.

== Atlanta Christian College ==
After several unsuccessful attempts by other parties to start a Christian college in the Atlanta, Georgia area, BonDurant and his wife, Sarah BonDurant (née Presley), founded Atlanta Christian College in 1937. Financial resources were provided by Fulton County Judge T. O. Hathcock. BonDurant served as the college's first President until he resigned over a dispute with the trustees in 1947.

== Mid-Atlantic Christian University ==
BonDurant then found employment as an evangelist of the Roanoke District Christian churches and churches of Christ in eastern North Carolina in 1947. The BonDurants founded Mid-Atlantic Christian University (known as Roanoke Bible College until 2009) in Elizabeth City, North Carolina in 1948 due to the extreme lack of preachers in the area at the time. Under his leadership, Mid-Atlantic Christian University received its first school accreditation in 1979 from the Association for Biblical Higher Education. BonDurant retired in 1986 and was succeeded by William A. Griffin.

BonDurant was awarded the Order of the Long Leaf Pine on December 2, 2009, by North Carolina Governor Bev Perdue for his work at Mid-Atlantic Christian University and his contributions to the state. He turned 100 in August 2015. BonDurant died on July 11, 2017, at age 101.

== See also ==
Preceded by none	President of Atlanta Christian College; 1937—1947	Succeeded by Orvel C. Crowder
Preceded by none	President of Mid-Atlantic Christian University; 1948—1986	Succeeded by William A. Griffin
