= Dudley Rutherford =

American pastor

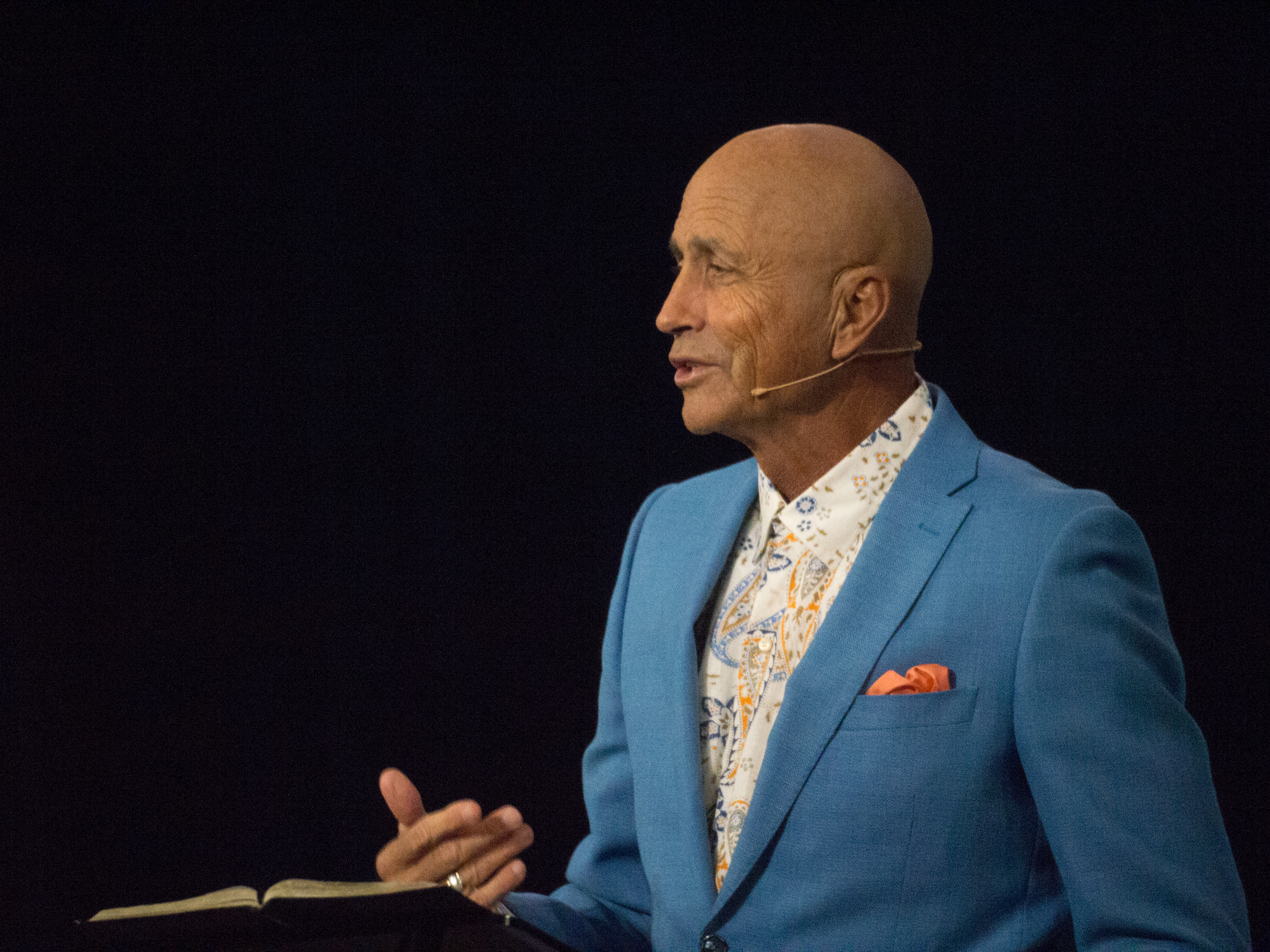
- Occupation: Pastor

Dudley Rutherford is the senior pastor of Shepherd Church in Porter Ranch, Los Angeles, California. This is a nondenominational Christian "megachurch" with 8,000 attendees at its services each week.

== Background ==
Rutherford's grandfather, father, uncles and brothers are all preachers, as well as his in-laws. He earned a Bachelor's degree in Church Growth from the Ozark Christian College in Joplin, Missouri. He went on to the Pacific Christian College (now called Hope International University) in Fullerton, California where he earned his Master's degree. He is an active convention speaker, and was Vice President of the North American Christian Convention. He has spoken for several professional sports teams, and was a featured chapel speaker for the World Series. He is married with three children and lives in Porter Ranch.

Rutherford became pastor of Hillcrest Christian Church in Granada Hills in 1987.

== Congregation ==
Shepherd Church is a nondenominational megachurch (one with at least 2,000 congregants) in the "Southern California Bible Belt". In 2008, Outreach magazine ranked Rutherford's Shepherd Church 92nd in size in America, with attendance of 7,400. Some criticize churches like this, calling them "church lite", but others say they help people who find the experience more accessible than traditional churches.

In October 2006 the church opened its first hybrid, Westside Shepherd of the Hills Church, based at the Wadsworth Theatre on the grounds of the Veterans Administration in Brentwood, California. Rutherford travelled to the new location almost every Sunday to deliver the message. The church was planning to launch hybrids in Lancaster, California and Compton, California in 2008. In August 2009 Rutherford, who had spent the previous fall preaching about Bible prophecy, said attendance had grown from an average of 8,030 in the previous year to 9,673 in 2009, a 17% increase. Rutherford attributed the increase to a feeling of despair brought about by the economic downturn, and a need to focus on spiritual needs rather than pursuit of the dollar.

Rutherford was a prominent proponent for California Proposition 8 and has claimed, for instance, that legalizing gay marriage would ultimately lead to "it being illegal to read some sections of the Bible" and that "the polygamists would be next."

== Bibliography ==
- Dudley Rutherford (2005). Proverbs in a Haystack: Finding That Hidden Truth in God's Word. Joy Comes in the Morning Productions. ISBN 0-9764289-0-3.
- Dudley Rutherford (2005). Romancing Royalty. Shepherd of the Hills.
- Dudley Rutherford (2006). Keeping a Smile on Your Faith – A Study Through the Book of James. Joy Comes in the Morning Productions. ISBN 978-0-9764289-3-0.
- Dudley Rutherford (2011). Unleashed: The Church Turning the World Upside Down. Standard Publishing. ISBN 978-0-7847-3179-6.
- Dudley Rutherford (2012). God Has an App for That: Discover God's Solution for the Major Issues of Life. Regal. ISBN 978-0-8307-6088-6.
- Dudley Rutherford (2014). Walls Fall Down: 7 Steps from the Battle of Jericho to Overcome Any Challenge. Thomas Nelson. ISBN 978-1400206032.
