= Barry McCarty =

American Preacher and religious educator

C. Barry McCarty (born 1953) is an American preacher and educator who has been associated with the Southern Baptist Convention and the Christian churches and churches of Christ. McCarty is a former president of Cincinnati Christian University. From January 2010 to June 2015 he was the senior pastor of Peachtree Christian Church, a Disciples of Christ congregation, in Atlanta, Georgia. In August 2015, his 30-year relationship with the SBC culminated in changing his church affiliation to Southern Baptist and accepting a call to the faculty of Southwestern Baptist Theological Seminary in Fort Worth as professor of preaching and rhetoric. Now he is a Professor of Rhetoric & Communications at Truett-McConnell University in Cleveland, Georgia.

== Early life and education ==
Barry McCarty was born and raised in Atlanta, Georgia. He graduated with a BS in biblical studies and Christian ministries from Mid-Atlantic Christian University in 1975. He later earned an MA in speech communication from Abilene Christian University in 1977 and a Ph.D. in rhetoric and argumentation from the University of Pittsburgh in 1980.

== Academia and ministry ==
McCarty returned to Mid-Atlantic Christian University in 1980, teaching preaching, rhetoric, debate, and philosophy. In 1988 he left to become the fifth president of Cincinnati Christian University.

His term was marked by record growth in admissions and balanced budgets after the college almost went bankrupt in 1986. McCarty left Cincinnati Christian University in 1993 to enter new church work, leading the Lakota Christian Church in Cincinnati, Ohio to grow from a small group meeting in a rented schoolhouse cafeteria to over 1000 members in only five years.

McCarty received media attention in 2005 as Preaching Minister of Valley View Christian Church in Dallas, Texas, since it was the church that White House Counsel Harriet Miers attended. Miers's conservative Christian views and relative judicial obscurity made her nomination to the Supreme Court controversial. McCarty supported her nomination without taking an official political position.

McCarty was the senior pastor at Peachtree Christian Church, a Disciples of Christ congregation in Atlanta, Georgia, prior to accepting a call to the faculty of Southwestern Baptist Theological Seminary in Fort Worth.

McCarty posted a controversial Twitter photo in April 2017 dressed as a hip-hop/rap artist. The post gained media attention including Black Lives Matter advocate, Shaun King. Southwestern Baptist Theological Seminary issued a public apology in response to media backlash. The response included a message from the seminary's president, Paige Patterson.

== Other activities ==
McCarty was the Chief Parliamentarian of the Southern Baptist Convention from 1986 - 2022.

His Parliamentary Guide for Church Leaders (Broadman & Publishers, 1987, 2012), now in a 25th Silver Anniversary Edition, has become the standard guidebook in the field of church business meetings. He is also the author of Well Said & Worth Saying: A Public Speaking Guide for Church Leaders (Broadman & Holman Publishers, 1990), and Parables & Miracles: Blueprints for 30 Messages Built Upon God's Word (Standard Publishing, 1999).

== Personal life ==
McCarty has been married to his wife Pat since 1975. They have three adult children.

Preceded by Harvey C. Bream, Jr	President of Cincinnati Christian University; 1988—1993	Succeeded by David Grubbs
Preceded by none	Southern Baptist Convention Chief Parliamentarian; 1986—current	Succeeded by incumbent
