= David Faust =

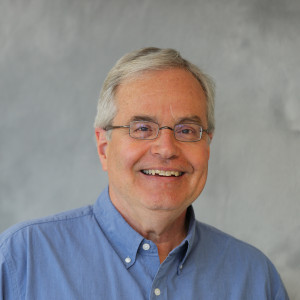
- Born: 18 June 1954; Wilmington, Ohio, U.S.
- Occupation(s): Former President of Cincinnati Christian University, Former Senior Pastor of East 91st Street Christian Church

David Faust was the seventh president of Cincinnati Christian University. He is now the Associate Minister at East 91st Street Christian Church in Indianapolis, Indiana, where he previously served as the Senior Minister from 1999 to 2002.

== Publications ==
Since 1996 he has written a weekly column for The Lookout, a weekly magazine for Christian families. He has also written or co-authored 16 books including Unquenchable Faith, Married for Good, Faith Under Fire, Embracing the Truth, The Life of Moses, Monday Morning Prayers, Monday Morning Prayers, and Honest Questions/Honest Answers.

== Leadership ==
He served in the ministry or on the university faculty since the late 1970s, becoming president in 2002 and serving for 12 years. He also received two degrees from the university when it was called Cincinnati Bible Seminary. He was the President of the 2006 North American Christian Convention.

== Personal life ==
He has been married to his wife Candy, a registered nurse, since 1975.
