= Johnson University Florida =

Private Christian university in Kissimmee, Florida, U.S.

Coordinates: 28°18′10.1″N 81°21′45″W

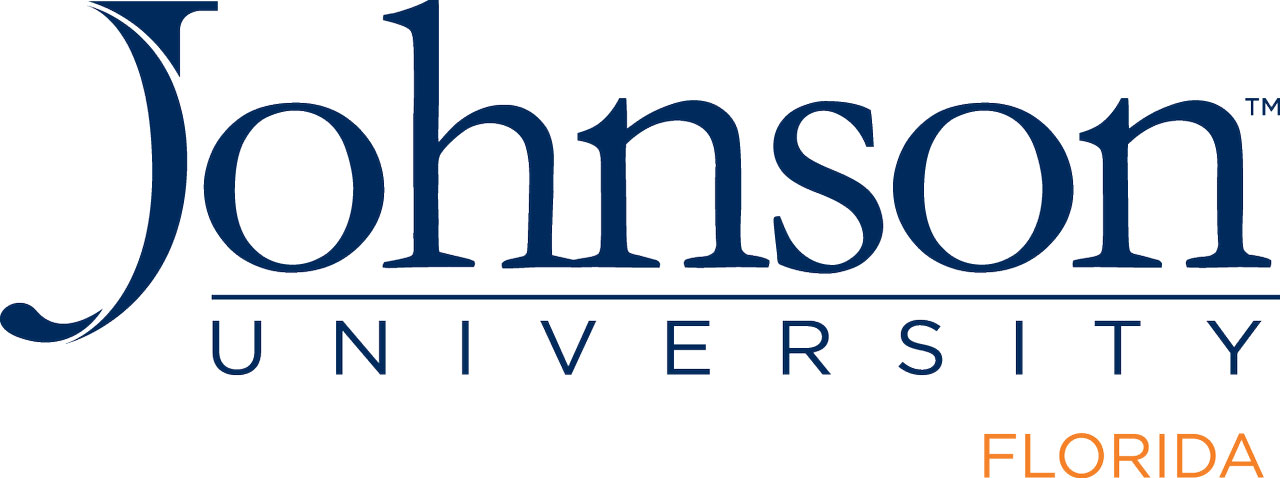
- Former names: Central Florida Bible College (1975–1986); Florida Christian College (1986–2013)
- Motto: Faith, Prayer, Work
- Type: Private university
- Active: 1976–2024
- Religious affiliation: Restoration Movement
- President: Tommy Smith
- Provost: Gregory Linton
- Faculty: 25
- Administrative staff: 31
- Students: 188
- Location: Kissimmee, Florida, United States
- Campus: 44 acres (18 ha); Suburban
- Colors: Navy Blue, Orange and White
- Nickname: Suns
- Sporting affiliations: NCCAA – Division II South
- Website: www.JohnsonU.edu

Johnson University Florida was a private Christian university in Kissimmee, Florida, United States. It was part of the Johnson University system with its main campus outside Knoxville, Tennessee, and an online campus. It was affiliated with the Independent Christian Church of the Restoration Movement. The campus was closed in 2024.

== History ==
Johnson University Florida was founded in 1975 as Central Florida Bible College. Following a move to its current main campus in 1986, the name changed to Florida Christian College.

In its last decade operating as Florida Christian College (FCC), the campus faced increasing financial challenges. Those challenges were greatly exacerbated by the onset of the Great Recession in 2008. On December 10, 2012, the Southern Association of Colleges and Schools revoked Florida Christian College's regional accreditation, effectively terminating the college's ability to function independently. Although the college appealed the committee's decision, SACS denied the appeal in February 2013. Under the administrative guidance of Johnson University, the college sought an injunction against SACS in order to restore its regional accreditation and proceed with a planned merger between the two schools. On March 8, 2013, the U.S. District Court of Northern Georgia granted the injunction restoring probationary status of FCC as a member of SACS.

=== Acquisition by Johnson University ===
Johnson University purchased the Florida campus, simultaneously permitting financial oversight of the college and erasing its debt. Next, FCC President Bill Behrman stepped down and David L. Eubanks, former president of Johnson University, became the chief operating officer. Lastly, the trustees of Johnson University voted to incorporate the Florida property into its system, and the campus officially became Johnson University Florida on July 1, 2013.

=== Closure ===
On July 7, 2023, Johnson University announced that its Florida campus would be closing on June 30, 2024. The university cited a failure to increase enrollment after the creation of a "turnaround plan" in 2021 that attempted to revitalize enrollment, retention, and income. The university offered students the opportunity to transfer to the Tennessee campus, complete their degree online, or transfer to nearby universities in Florida. In April 2024, Osceola County announced that it would buy the university's campus.

== Academics ==
The curriculum offered courses in a variety of majors. All students were required to take a core of Bible and theology classes along with their chosen major. The college offered multiple undergraduate programs, including certificates, Associate of Arts and Associate of Applied Science programs, Bachelor of Arts and Bachelor of Science programs, and a Master of Strategic Ministry program.

Johnson University Florida had been nationally accredited by the Association for Biblical Higher Education since 1985 and was regionally accredited by the Southern Association of Colleges and Schools from 1995 to 2012. After losing its accreditation with SACS, it was acquired by Johnson University and was once again regionally accredited. It was a member of the National Association of Independent Colleges and Universities and the Florida Association of Colleges and Universities.

The university was organized into seven schools:

- School of Arts & Sciences
- School of Bible & Theology
- School of Business & Public Leadership
- School of Christian Ministries
- School of Communication & Creative Arts
- School of Social & Behavioral Sciences
- Templar School of Education

== Athletics ==
The athletic teams of the Johnson–Florida (JUFL) campus were called the Suns. The campus was a member of the National Christian College Athletic Association (NCCAA), primarily competing as an independent in the South Region of the Division II level.

JUFL competed in five intercollegiate varsity sports: Men's sports include basketball and soccer; while women's sports include basketball, soccer and volleyball.

The men's baseball team earned second place in the 2012 NCCAA D-II National Championship and third place in the 2013 National Championship.

The men's basketball team won the 2012 and 2020 NCCAA D-II South Regional Championship.

== Notable people ==
- Terry Bradds – jazz guitarist (advanced guitar instructor)
- David L. Eubanks – former president of Johnson University and chief operating officer of Johnson University Florida from 2013 to 2015
- Andrew Peterson – Christian author and recording artist (Class of 1997)
- James E. Smith – Bible scholar (professor emeritus)
