= Fair Meadows (Creswell, Maryland) =

Historic house in Maryland, United States

- U.S. National Register of Historic Places
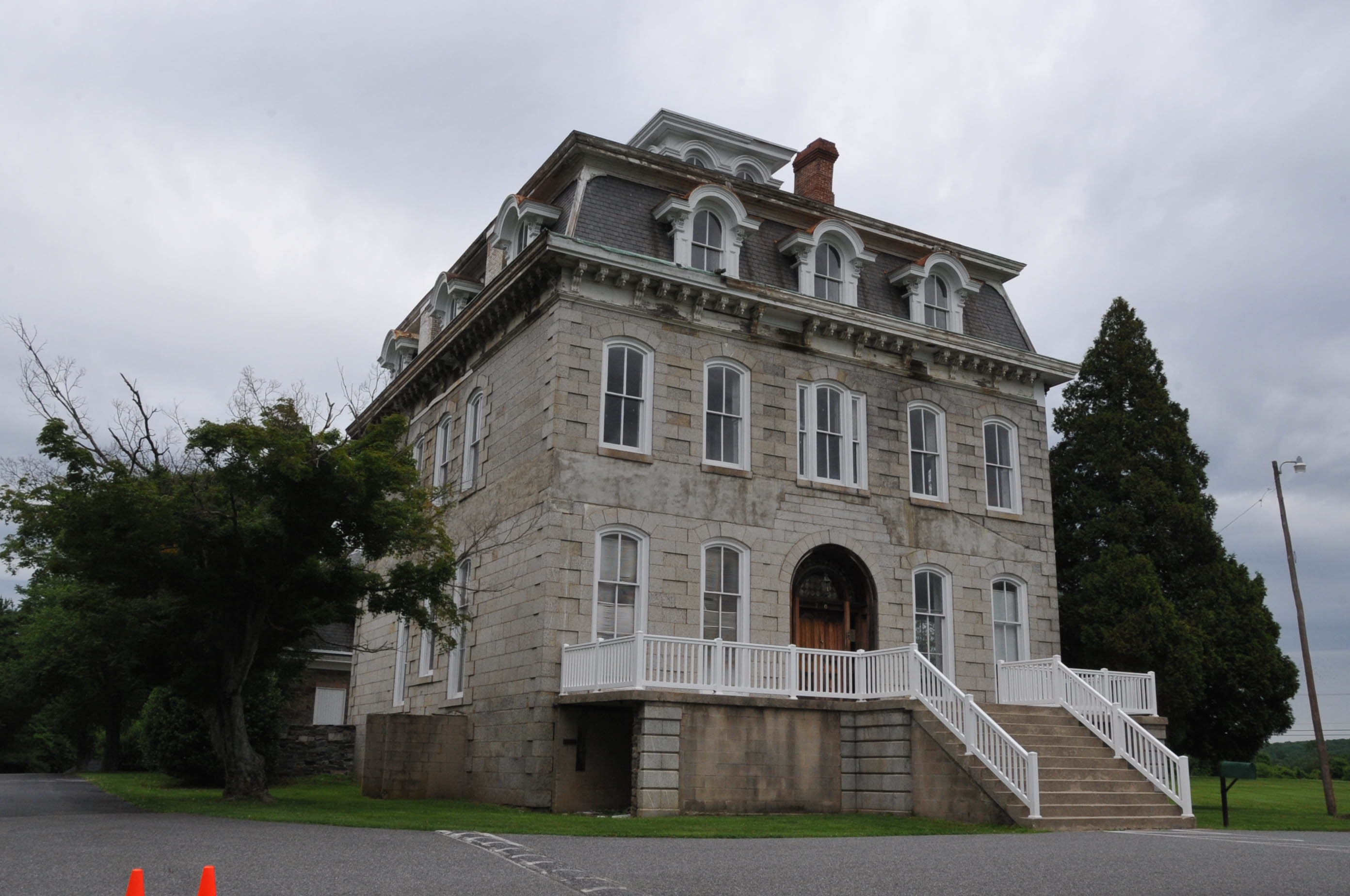
- Fair Meadows in 2007

- Location within Maryland Location within the United States
- Location: Creswell Road (MD 543), Creswell, Maryland
- Coordinates: 39°29′57″N 76°15′58″W
- Area: 10.4 acres (4.2 ha)
- Built: 1868
- Architect: Attributed to George A. Frederick or Jackson Gott
- Architectural style: Second Empire
- Demolished: 2022
- NRHP reference No.: 80004255
- Added to NRHP: November 25, 1980

Fair Meadows was a historic home located at Creswell, Harford County, Maryland. It was a 2 1/2-story Second Empire–style house constructed in 1868 for the last owner of Harford Furnace, Clement Dietrich. The house was constructed of irregularly laid ashlar and features a mansard roof, cupola, dormers with rounded hoods, and stone quoins. The interior had a center hall plan and included intricate inlay designs, black and white marble tiles in the center hall, plaster ceiling ornaments and friezes, marble mantels, and original crystal chandeliers. Also on the property are the ruins of a round springhouse, a one-story stone carriage house, a brick smokehouse, and three hip-roofed coursed rubble stone outbuildings. The estate was later home to Eastern Christian College.

The house was listed on the National Register of Historic Places in 1980.

On May 3, 2020, a devastating fire caused extensive damage to the building. By 2022 the remaining structure was demolished.
