= James E. Smith (biblical scholar) =

American biblical scholar (born 1939)

James Edward Smith (born 1939) is an American biblical scholar.

== Biography ==
James E. Smith was born the third of four sons born to Fred and Thelma Smith. James E. Smith was born at St. Mary Hospital in Huntington, West Virginia, unlike his two older brothers who were born in India while his parents were missionaries there. James' father was a preacher who met his mother while ministering at a church while attending Cincinnati Bible Seminary. James was raised based on Biblical teachings and values. James Smith has been said to have always been "a planner- a doer- a manager- an arranger" even as a boy. These characteristics carried on into his youth, James was an active member of the Boy Scouts of America and became an Eagle Scout. In high school he became president of the student council.

After high school James attended his father's alma mater at Cincinnati Bible Seminary, a branch of Cincinnati Christian University where he completed his ThB and MDiv. Before leaving for Seminary Smith met the woman he would marry Rachel Stout. One of James Smith's earliest ministries was in Sherman, Kentucky.

A year into seminary James E. Smith and Rachel Stout became engaged to marry and married in the very church James E. Smith had been ministering at in Sherman, Kentucky. James E. Smith and wife Rachel have two children the eldest a son Keith and daughter Yona.

In 1974 James E. Smith's brother Fred Smith Jr. became part of a committee to start a Bible College in Florida. Fred Smith Jr. offered James E. Smith the position of academic dean at this developing college but he would have to leave his post on staff at Cincinnati Bible College and Seminary. Months later James E. Smith accepted the position as dean in the developing Central Florida Bible College, now known as Florida Christian College, now known as Johnson University Florida. He and his family made the move to Florida.

== Education ==
After High School James E. Smith went to Cincinnati Bible Seminary, James E. Smith received his B.A. and B.Th. from Cincinnati Bible College. He proceeded to work on his Masters in Divinity from Cincinnati Bible Seminary. James E. Smith found his most well known title as "Doc Smith" after receiving his Ph.D. from Hebrew Union College-Jewish Institute of Religion.

== Accomplishments ==
James E. Smith was in the preaching ministry for 17 years and is still active in teaching in local churches around his home in Central Florida. Doc Smith was an esteemed instructor at Cincinnati Bible College and Seminary from 1963-1976. After this he became Academic Dean at Florida Christian College from 1976 - 1989. He was made Distinguished Professor of Bible while on staff at Florida Christian College. Smith is one of few who have remained an active part of Florida Christian College through its growth and transformation from Central Florida Bible College to the institution that is present today. Smith also serves as Chairman of the Division of Biblical Studies at FCC (Florida Christian College). Smith remains a part-time professor at Florida Christian College and has been a part of the teaching staff since 1976. Doc Smith and his wife Rachel aid in making materials for the national Bible Bowl and Beginner Bowl programs.

== Works ==
=== Writings ===
He has written multiple Bible commentaries and articles in journals and magazines. The Christian Standard is one of the most esteemed that Doc. Smith has written for but his writings have also been included in some Bible Study quarterlies and the Sunlife magazine for Florida Christian College.

=== Books ===
James E. Smith has authored more than 25 books, many on Old Testament Books and History.

- Behold! The Revelation of Jesus Christ
- What Does the Future Hold?
- Dictionary Figures in the Book of Revelation
- Which Books Belong in the Bible?
- A Funny Thing Happened on the Way to the Pulpit
- Biblical Protology
- Postexilic Prophets
- Preaching Values in the Bible
- God's Law Our Compass
- Bible History Made Simple
- The Old Testament Books Made Simple
- The New Testament Books Made Simple
- Book of Acts Made Simple
- Jesus Life Made Simple
- Paul’s Life Made Simple
- Daniel: A Christian Interpretation
- Ezekiel: A Christian Interpretation
- Isaiah: A Christian Interpretation
- Jeremiah: A Christian Interpretation
- Hosea & Amos: A Christian Interpretation
- Old Testament Survey Series: The Pentateuch
- Old Testament Survey Series: The Books of History
- Old Testament Survey Series: The Wisdom Literature and Psalms
- Old Testament Survey Series: The Major Prophets
- Old Testament Survey Series: The Minor Prophets
- College Press NIV Commentary: 1 & 2 Samuel
- Faith in Confrontation
- Daniel: A Christian Interpretation
- Jesus: Heaven's King
