= Clinton College (South Carolina) =

Christian college in South Carolina, U.S.

- Former names: Clinton Normal and Industrial Institute, Clinton Junior College
- Type: Private historically black college
- Established: 1894; 132 years ago
- Religious affiliation: AME Zion Church
- Chairman: Eric Leake
- President: Pamela Richardson Wilks
- Students: 261
- Location: Rock Hill, South Carolina, United States; 34°54′49″N 81°02′37″W
- Colors: Black, gold, burgundy
- Nickname: Golden Bears
- Sporting affiliations: NCCAA – Division I South
- Website: www.clintoncollege.edu

Clinton College is a private historically black Christian college in Rock Hill, South Carolina. It is accredited by the Transnational Association of Christian Colleges and Schools.

== History ==
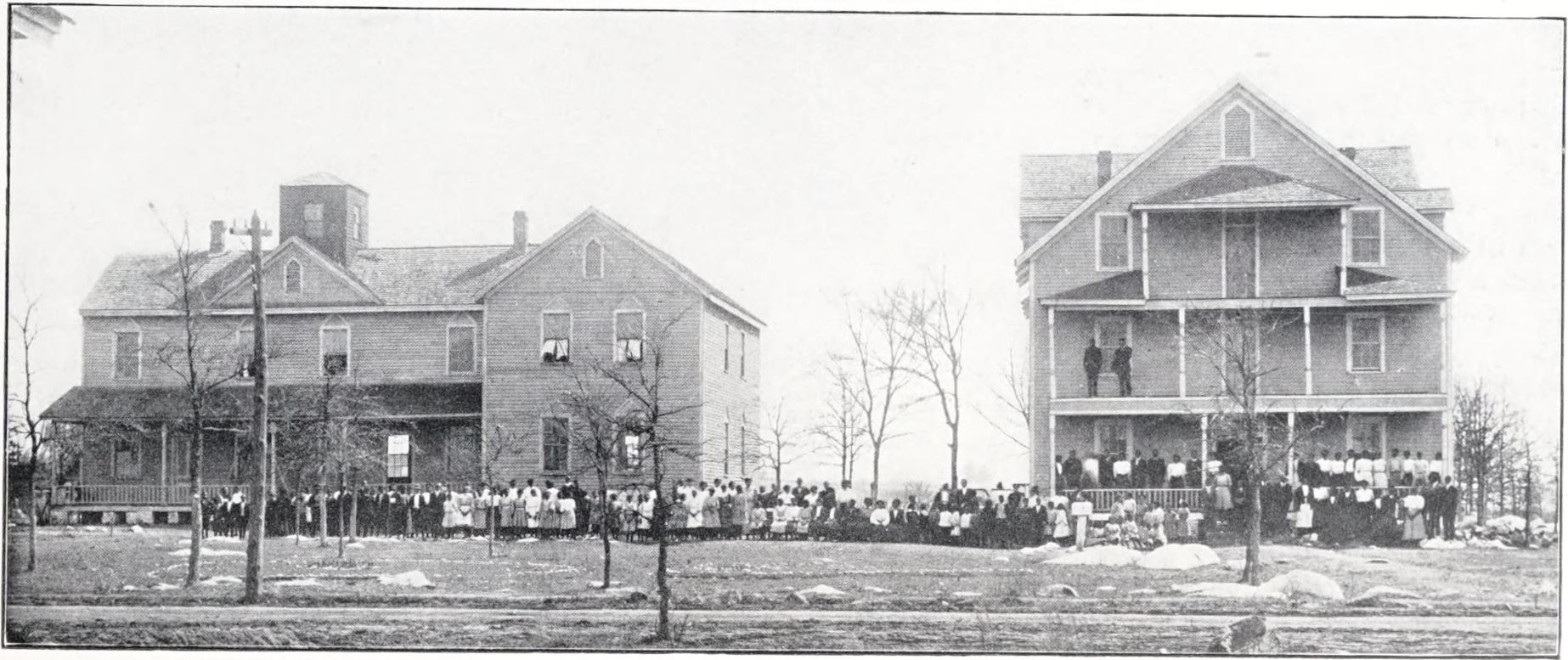
Clinton Normal and Industrial Institute, c. 1910

It was founded as the Clinton Institute in 1894 and named after Bishop Caleb Isom Clinton of the African Methodist Episcopal Zion Church's Palmetto Conference. On June 22, 1909, it was incorporated as Clinton Normal and Industrial Institute after receiving authorization to grant state teacher certificates.

The school grew in the postwar era from the late 1940s into the 1960s and in 1965 the college changed its name to Clinton Junior College when the charter was amended to offer associate degrees.

In 2013, the college was renamed from Clinton Junior College to Clinton College after it received accreditation to become a four-year institution. The college added two bachelor programs, a Bachelor of Arts in Religious Studies and a Bachelor of Science in Business Administration.

Clinton College celebrated 130 years of higher education in 2024.

The college began missing employee paychecks and health insurance in April 2026, reportedly due to severe cash flow issues.

== Academics ==
Clinton College offers associate degree programs in business administration, early childhood development, liberal arts, natural sciences, and religious studies. The college added four-year programs in 2013 and now offers bachelor's degree programs in nursing, healthcare administration, music, biology, business administration, cybersecurity, religious studies, sports management, and interdisciplinary studies.

== Athletics ==
Clinton College's athletic teams are known as the Golden Bears. The college competes as a member of the National Christian College Athletic Association (NCCAA). Clinton fields men's and women's basketball and cross country, women's volleyball, men's golf, E-Sports and cheerleading, as well as a number of junior varsity and club sports teams. The college is a founding member of the USCAA's Eastern Metro Athletic Conference (EMAC) in 2018. The Clinton College men's basketball team won the first EMAC championship on February 23, 2019, when they defeated Johnson & Wales University-Charlotte 77–75.
