= Central India Christian Mission =

Christian missionary organization in India

Central India Christian Mission or CICM is a Christian missionary organization in India. It is supported by Christian churches and churches of Christ, which is part of the Restoration Movement. Its United States office is located in Indianapolis, Indiana.

== History ==
CICM was founded by Ajai Lall and his wife, Indu, in 1982. It has since grown to over 500 employees and has planted over 3,000 churches in central and northern India, Nepal, and near the northeast India/Bhutan border. CICM sent its first missionary to Bangladesh in 2003.

== Facilities ==
CICM currently operates a 200-bed hospital and Central India Bible Academy (CIBA), which trains over 200 preachers each year.

== Executive Directors ==
- Ajai Lall (1982–present)
