= Bible quiz =

Bible Quiz, also known as Bible Bowl or Bible Quizzing, is a quiz-bowl competition based on Bible memorization and study. The competition takes place between teams (often representing individual churches), and participants are quizzed on the content of a pre-determined section of the Bible. They are a popular activity in some Protestant churches and organizations, particularly in the United States. The exact rules of the game differ depending on the sponsoring organization.

The competition is similar to Quick Recall in many American schools, but it uses the Bible as the subject. Competitions which use the name "Bible Bowl" are modelled on television's College Bowl in the 1950s. Most groups feature teams competing to be the first to "buzz in" using an electronic lockout device, much like those still used in TV game shows such as Jeopardy! today. Some organizations, however, such as Nazarene Bible quizzing and the C&MA bible quizzing program, use benches (or pads) instead of buzzers, jumping when they know the question, and giving the required information necessary to be counted correct.

== History ==
After the Second World War, youth organizations across the United States formed Youth for Christ as an umbrella organization to coordinate their Christian evangelical action. One of Youth for Christ's popular activities in many areas was Bible quizzing, in which teams organized according to local high schools competed against one another in local areas, known as rallies. Competition would be between three teams of four players each who would attempt to answer twenty questions, read aloud one at a time. Players answering five questions correctly or three incorrectly need to be replaced by another player, and other substitutions were also permitted. In some regions of the United States, the local quiz team champions would travel to compete against champion teams from other areas, and national competitions also were held at the annual Winona Lake Bible Conference Youth for Christ conventions in Winona Lake, Indiana, where national team champions were determined. Popularity achieved its zenith in the late 1950s and early 1960s. In the 1959 competition, there were 2000 participating teams and 7000 spectators.

One of the unusual features of early Youth for Christ Bible quizzing was the challenge to participants to jump to their feet from a sitting position to win the right to answer each question. At first, judges would determine the first to jump by viewing above index cards to see whose head first "broke the plane." But, as time passed, local Youth for Christ rallies built or purchased special seat cushions with electrical relay switches that lit signal lights on consoles after pressure was removed due to the quizzer jumping up from the seat. In this way, the right to answer went to the first to leave his/her seat rather than the first to appear to have jumped, thus removing any advantage for taller participants. This was one of the earliest mixed gender competitions for teens which partially depended on some athletic ability.

As the format of Youth for Christ activities changed in the late 1960s, Bible quiz teams began to represent individual churches, and groups of churches from the same denomination began to hold competitions limited to those denominations apart from the Youth for Christ supervision.

== In the media ==
Bible Quiz is the name of a feature documentary by filmmaker Nicole Teeny. The film is a coming-of-age story of an Assemblies of God teen Bible Quizzer on her quest to win the 2008 National Bible Quiz Championship which took place in Green Bay, Wisconsin that year. The film premiered at the 2013 Slamdance Film Festival where it won the Grand Jury Award for Best Documentary and was picked up for distribution.

Bible Bowl was a Christian game show in the United States. Hosted by "Coach" Jack Gray and a robot, the program featured competition between two teams (the Bible Boys and the Gospel Girls). Taped at KJRH in Tulsa, Oklahoma, the show occasionally appeared on various religious cable television channels in the 1970s & 1980s.

== See also ==
- The American Bible Challenge
- International Bible Contest
