= Point University =

Christian college in West Point, Georgia, US

Coordinates: 32.8791°N 85.1869°W

- Former name: Atlanta Christian College (1937–2011)
- Motto: Κήρυξον τὸν λόγον
- Motto in English: Preach the Word
- Type: Private university
- Established: 1937; 89 years ago
- Religious affiliation: Christian churches and churches of Christ
- President: Stacy A. Bartlett
- Faculty: 414
- Students: 2,900
- Location: West Point, Georgia, United States
- Campus: Suburban 54 acres (0.22 km^{2})
- Colors: Navy Blue & Gold
- Nickname: Skyhawks
- Sporting affiliations: NAIA – SSAC
- Website: point.edu
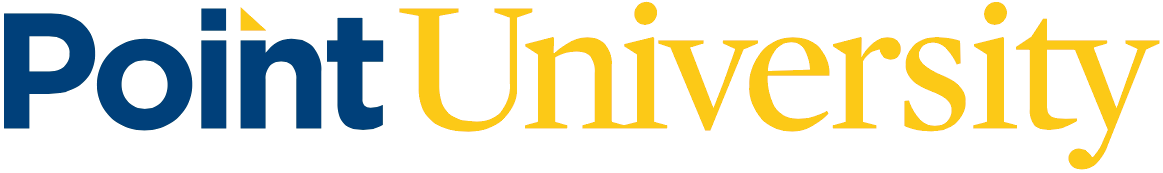

Point University is a private evangelical Christian college in West Point, Georgia and was founded in 1937 as Atlanta Christian College in East Point, Georgia. The college announced its name change to Point University in 2011 and relocated its main campus to West Point in June 2012. As of 2025, over 2,900 students are enrolled both on campus and online.

== History ==
=== Atlanta Christian College ===
Atlanta Christian College was founded in 1937 by Judge Thomas Olin Hathcock (1879–1966), a prominent Fulton County, Georgia judge from 1914 until 1942. He and his wife, Nora Head Hathcock, were members of the Christian churches and churches of Christ, the denomination that the institution has always been affiliated with. The property for the campus was from a 300-acre farm Nora Hathcock had inherited.

Following its 1937 founding, Atlanta Christian College devoted itself mainly to the education of ministers, missionaries, and other church-related workers. In 1965, the college became an accredited member of the American Association of Bible Colleges (AABC). In 1990, in conjunction with a broadening of its curriculum, the college was accredited by the Commission on Colleges of the Southern Association of Colleges and Schools (SACS) to award associate and baccalaureate degrees.

== Name Change and Relocation ==
=== Relocation ===
In the early days of Atlanta Christian College, the 300-acre campus had a distinctly rural flavor. By the mid-2000s, however, the student body had begun to outgrow the campus, and there were limited opportunities for further expansion due to the ever-encroaching sprawl of metro-Atlanta. The board agreed that it was time to find a new location for the main campus, and they began searching for other potential locations for the College.

In fall 2012, the traditional, residential campus relocated to West Point, Georgia and the growing Greater Valley Area, a community with ample opportunity for the growth of the University’s campus.

=== Name Change ===
Along with the relocation of the main campus came the need for a new name. It would’ve been difficult to continue as Atlanta Christian College in a community decidedly outside the metro area, and Point’s expansion to multiple site locations made a geographic name less appropriate. Further, the planned diversification into graduate programs made the name “university” a better fit.

The University worked with a Christian public relations firm to brainstorm and vet many possible names. Ultimately, the name Point was selected for both its geographic significance — our move from East Point to West Point — and its symbolic significance related to pointing students to Christ.

=== Campus Expansion ===
When Point relocated to West Point, Georgia, in 2012, the campus consisted of just four buildings — the Lanier Academic Center, the Scott Fine Arts Center, the Dining Hall, and the Parr House. The University leased local apartment buildings to serve as student housing.

Since then, the University has acquired or leased nine more facilities — the Hub student center, the Band Building, the Point University Golf Club, and student housing locations Skyhawk Landing, The Lofts, The Summit, Hawk Refuge, The Nest, the Living-Learning Community, and the Townhomes. Point’s campus has greatly expanded and now spans across downtown West Point. The University also shares local facilities for its athletic programs in West Point and in Valley, Alabama.

== Leadership ==
In 2024, Point University announced the retirement of President Dean Collins, after nearly twenty years of leadership. Collins oversaw the renaming of Point University, as well as the main campus's move from East Point to West Point. Collins currently serves as Point University chancellor.

Dr. Stacy A. Bartlett became the eighth president of Point University on July 1, 2025. Bartlett, a native of metro Atlanta, is a 2005 graduate of Point University and has served the University since her graduation. Bartlett is the first woman to lead Point University.

=== Presidents ===
- George W. BonDurant (1937–1947)
- Orvel C. Crowder (1947–1955)
- James C. Redmon (1955–1978)
- Paul K. Carrier (1978–1984)
- James C. Donovan (1984–1993)
- R. Edwin Groover (1993–2006)
- Dean C. Collins (2006–2025)
- Stacy A. Bartlett (2025–present)

== Academics ==
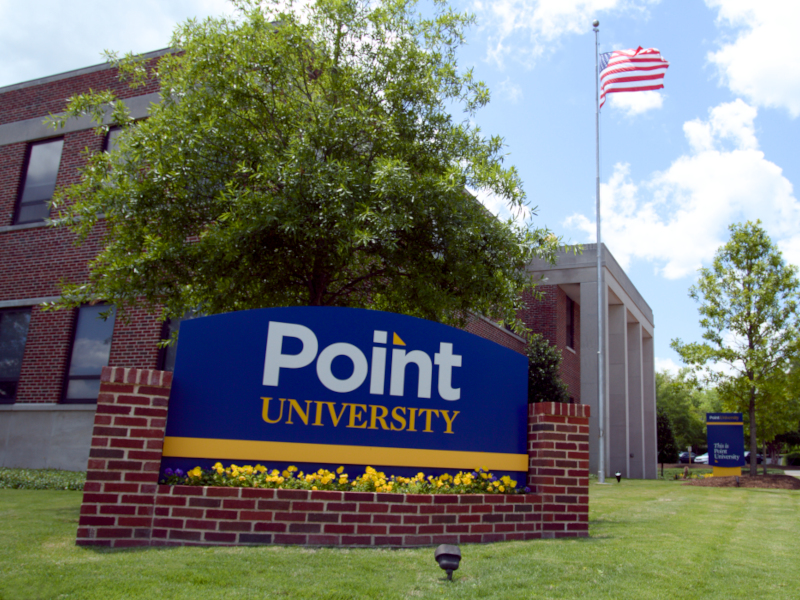
Lanier Academic Center

Point University is accredited by the Commission on Colleges of the Southern Association of Colleges and Schools (SACSCOC) to award associate, baccalaureate, and master degrees. The University’s education programs have earned accreditation by the National Council on Accreditation Teacher Education (NCATE) and the Professional Standards Commission (PSC) of the State of Georgia.

=== Undergraduate Programs ===
Point University offers more than 40 degree programs, both residential and online, organized into four academic colleges.

==== College of Arts & Sciences ====
The largest academic college, the College of Arts & Sciences spans a wide range of fields and majors in order to give students a broad foundation for understanding and interpreting the past, present and future.

==== College of Biblical Studies & Ministry ====
The College of Biblical Studies & Ministry prepares students for a career in ministry by training them to understand and interpret Scripture and the biblical languages.

==== College of Education & Behavioral Sciences ====
The College of Education & Behavioral Sciences prepares students to serve others through teaching, social work and a variety of helping professions.

==== Stith College of Business ====
The Stith College of Business prepares students with a Christian worldview and complex problem-solving skills to impact their workplace in a variety of business-related fields.

=== Graduate Programs ===
During Point 2020, the University’s 2015-20 strategic plan, graduate programs were listed as a priority, and the board unanimously approved continuing efforts to develop these programs.

In early 2016, the application for the level change required to offer graduate programs was submitted to SACSCOC. After approval, the first graduate programs — the master of transformative ministry and the master of business administration — were launched that fall.

The first students to earn master’s degrees graduated in 2018, and since then, nearly 200 students have followed in their footsteps.

=== Online Programs ===
For most of its history, all Atlanta Christian College degree programs were only offered in person, but in 2008, the College launched Access, a new program offered to adults seeking to continue their education. This in-person program, which started with once-weekly night classes for adult students, evolved into a fully online program for those desiring a degree they could earn without traveling to the University’s physical locations.

Point’s online program now makes up 75 percent of the University’s student body. Online education has expanded to include more than 40 programs, ranging from social work to accounting. These programs are fully asynchronous, allowing students to complete their degrees on their own schedules, while receiving the same support from the University that a residential student would.

=== Elevate Program ===
In 2021, several Chick-fil-A operators approached University leadership about their interest in a new concept for higher education. The idea that resulted from that brainstorming session: a program that allows employers to pay an annual fee to send their employees to college — at no cost to the employee. Out of this idea, the Elevate program was born.

Since its launch in 2022, the program has grown to include more than 300 businesses and organizations, educating more than 1,000 students and saving $45 million in tuition value. The program keeps employees who want to continue their education from having to choose between working full time or earning their degrees. Elevate makes it possible for them to do both, thus creating opportunities for individuals who might not have otherwise earned a degree.

The concept for Elevate has also led to the establishment of the GAP Scholarship. Donors who are interested in this model can give a set annual amount, which provides access to Point University’s online programs for a given number of students. The University chooses the students through its partnerships with various churches and nonprofit organizations, and these students can earn their degrees and graduate debt-free.

== Campus Life & Athletics ==
=== Campus Life ===
Point's small residential campus makes campus life an intimate, personal experience. Point’s campus offers multiple types of residence halls, and each one is either recently constructed or remodeled. All on-campus housing is located within walking distance of the Dining Hall, Lanier Academic Center, campus store and coffee shop, and the Scott Fine Arts Center.

==== Spiritual Formation ====
At Point University, the spiritual formation of each student is a priority. Point University’s Spiritual Formation initiatives are focused on three main categories:

- Out: Building relationships with students, no matter where they are on their faith journeys.
- In: Coming alongside students to help them discover the ways God wants to form and shape them.
- Up: Providing spaces in which the Point community can worship God through prayer, singing, and reflecting on His Word.

Point offers opportunities for corporate worship, personal mentorship and discipleship, and community engagement. At least once a month, the students, faculty, and staff of Point University gather for chapel, where they engage in a time of worship and teaching. The Feast House, Point's campus ministry, is also a popular gathering place, where students can build community, participate in small groups, and grow life-long relationships.

==== Housing Options ====
- Living and Learning Community - LLC is a small community environment for students seeking to encourage one another academically, socially and spiritually. This fully updated apartment-style housing offers students a greater level of independence with two bedrooms, a shared living room and a full kitchen.
- The Lofts - Located in downtown West Point, this is a suite-style facility. Each room has a private bathroom, and residents share a common living area with couches, table and television and a kitchen with updated appliances.
- The Nest - The Nest is a traditional, dorm-style residence hall within walking distance of the Lanier Academic Center and convenient to downtown West Point.
- The Summit - The Summit is a dorm-style hall with shared living and restroom spaces located in downtown West Point.
- Hawk Refuge - Only a block away from the Lanier Academic Center, in this suite-style facility each student has a private bathroom, and residents share a common living area with chairs, tables and television. The kitchen has full-sized refrigerators and microwaves for student use.
- Skyhawk Landing - This is a suite-style facility. Each room has a private bathroom and residents share a common living area with chairs, tables and television. The kitchen has full sized refrigerators and microwaves for student use.
- The Townhomes - Conveniently located across the street from the Lanier Academic Center, this new townhome-style housing offers students a greater level of independence with four bedrooms sleeping five students, a shared living and dining space and a full kitchen with two full bathrooms and a half bath.

==== Groups and Organizations ====
These student-led groups provide campus events, service opportunities, and more for every student to feel connected at Point:

- Delta Chapter of Omega Nu Lambda
- Fellowship of Christian Athletes
- Resident Assistants
- Student Ambassadors
- Student Athlete Advisory Committee
- Student Life Apprentices

=== Athletics ===
After moving its main campus in 2012, the institution was also accepted into the National Association of Intercollegiate Athletics (NAIA). The institution's athletics program expanded as part of the transition from the National Christian College Athletic Association (NCCAA) to the NAIA, including the addition of intercollegiate football, softball and cross country beginning in fall 2011. The athletics mascot was also changed from the Chargers to the Skyhawks. The Skyhawks are members of the Southern States Athletic Conference.

In 2022, the Skyhawks' mascot had no official name. Through a community voting process, students and alumni voted on 'Charger' as the name of the mascot as a tribute to the former Atlanta Christian College mascot.

The institution is a member of the National Association of Intercollegiate Athletics (NAIA), primarily competing in the Appalachian Athletic Conference (AAC) for most of its sports since the 2011–12 academic year. Its football team was a member of The Sun Conference for the 2014 and 2015 fall seasons, before moving to the Appalachian Division of the Mid-South Conference (MSC) where they competed from the 2017 to 2021 fall seasons (2017–18 to 2021–22 school years).

Point competes in 13 intercollegiate varsity sports. Men's sports include baseball, basketball, football, golf, lacrosse, soccer; while women's sports include flag football, basketball, golf, soccer, softball and volleyball; and co-ed sports include cheerleading. The sports are supported by 75 coaches and support staff.

On August 9, 2022, Point was invited and unanimously approved to join the Southern States Athletic Conference (SSAC), effective July 1, 2023.

==== Accomplishments ====
The Skyhawks have won a number of regional and national championships, most recently the 2022–23 AAC Tournament Champions in women's basketball and the 2010 NCCAA Division II national championship in baseball.

Point has received the Champions of Character Gold Five-Star Institution Award for five consecutive years.

== Notable alumni ==
- Jamie Grace (Class of 2012) – Christian singer-songwriter signed to TobyMac-founded label, Gotee Records and was later nominated for a Grammy Award.
