= List of college team nicknames in the United States =

This is an incomplete list of U.S. college nicknames.

If two nicknames are given, the first is for men's teams and the second for women's teams, unless otherwise noted.

Generally, athletics are mainly branded by their common name, meaning words like "University of" or "College" are usually omitted and only the unique name elements are used. For example, the University of Minnesota is only known as "Minnesota", San Diego State University as "San Diego State", and so on. Nonetheless, if a team's common name is different, it is displayed in parentheses, for example, University of Alabama at Birmingham (UAB), United States Military Academy (Army), University of California, Berkeley (California), etc. (Note: Common abbreviations are not shown. For example, "Institute of Technology" is commonly shortened to "Tech", so schools like Florida Institute of Technology do not display "Florida Tech". However, if the title of any page already uses the common name, for example, the official name of Virginia Tech is Virginia Polytechnic Institute and State University, only the short name will be displayed, since the page names are used instead of the full name of the institutions for this listing. There may also be cases where the university does not use the common abbreviation, for example, Massachusetts Institute of Technology uses "MIT" instead of "Massachusetts Tech" or "Mass Tech", in which case the common name will be shown in parentheses.) (Note: Some schools not only drop "University" or "College", and prefer to use shorter names. This tends to happen more often with state institutions. For example, Middle Tennessee State University uses "Middle Tennessee", McNeese State University uses "McNeese", or Central Connecticut State University uses "Central Connecticut"; although it can also occur in other cases, such as Rose–Hulman Institute of Technology that only uses "Rose–Hulman". In those situations, the common name is not displayed.) (Note: Sometimes, common names show the state where the school is located to avoid ambiguity. For example, the Anderson Ravens can include "(IN)", to clarify that they are located in the state of Indiana and differentiate them from the Anderson Trojans, which can include "(SC)" and are located in South Carolina. Although there may also be situations where only one institution adds its state in parentheses, such as the California Vulcans who use "(PA)" to distinguish themselves from the well-known California Golden Bears. In those cases, the state in parentheses is not shown, since that is what the location row is for.) The 12 most-used names of four-year college teams: Eagles (117), Hawks (107), Tigers (67), Lions (66), Cougars (59), Bulldogs (58), Panthers (55), Bears (52), Knights (51), Warriors (41), Wildcats (40), and Pioneers (35). (Note: Including names with attached adjectives such as "Blue", "Golden", "Flying", or "Fighting"; nonetheless, these data may be inexact.)

== A ==
=== AB–AK ===
Institution	Nickname	Location
Abilene Christian University	Wildcats	Abilene, Texas
Abraham Baldwin Agricultural College	Golden Stallions	Tifton, Georgia
Adams State University	Grizzlies	Alamosa, Colorado
Adelphi University	Panthers	Garden City, New York
Adrian College	Bulldogs	Adrian, Michigan
Agnes Scott College	Scotties	Decatur, Georgia
Aiken Technical College	Knights	Graniteville, South Carolina
Aims Community College	Aardvarks	Greeley, Colorado
United States Air Force Academy (Air Force)	Falcons	Air Force Academy, Colorado
University of Akron	Zips	Akron, Ohio

=== AL ===
Institution	Nickname	Location
University of Alabama	Crimson Tide	Tuscaloosa, Alabama
University of Alabama at Birmingham (UAB)	Blazers	Birmingham, Alabama
University of Alabama in Huntsville	Chargers	Huntsville, Alabama
Alabama A&M University	Bulldogs and Lady Bulldogs	Normal, Alabama
Alabama State University	Hornets and Lady Hornets	Montgomery, Alabama
Alamance Community College	River Otters	Graham, North Carolina
College of Alameda	Cougars	Alameda, California
University of Alaska Anchorage	Seawolves	Anchorage, Alaska
University of Alaska Fairbanks (Alaska)	Nanooks	Fairbanks, Alaska
University of Alaska Southeast	Humpback Whales	Juneau, Alaska
University at Albany (Albany)	Great Danes	Albany, New York
Albany College of Pharmacy and Health Sciences (ACPHS)	Panthers	Albany, New York
Albany State University	Golden Rams	Albany, Georgia
Albany Technical College	Titans	Albany, Georgia
College of The Albemarle	Dolphins	Elizabeth City, North Carolina
Albertus Magnus College	Falcons	New Haven, Connecticut
Albion College	Britons	Albion, Michigan
Albright College	Lions	Reading, Pennsylvania
Alcorn State University	Braves and Lady Braves	Lorman, Mississippi
Alexandria Technical and Community College	Legends	Alexandria, Minnesota
Alfred University	Saxons	Alfred, New York
Alfred State College	Pioneers	Alfred, New York
Alice Lloyd College	Eagles	Pippa Passes, Kentucky
Allan Hancock College	Bulldogs	Santa Maria, California
Allegany College of Maryland	Trojans	Cumberland, Maryland
Allegheny College	Gators	Meadville, Pennsylvania
Allen University	Yellow Jackets	Columbia, South Carolina
Allen Community College	Red Devils	Iola, Kansas
Alma College	Scots	Alma, Michigan
Alpena Community College	Lumberjacks	Alpena, Michigan
Alvernia University	Golden Wolves	Reading, Pennsylvania
Alverno College	Inferno	Milwaukee, Wisconsin
Alvin Community College	Dolphins	Alvin, Texas

=== AM ===
Institution	Nickname	Location
Amarillo College	Badgers	Amarillo, Texas
American University	Eagles	Washington, D.C.
American Indian College	Warriors	Phoenix, Arizona
American International College	Yellow Jackets	Springfield, Massachusetts
American Jewish University	Lions	Los Angeles, California
American River College	Beavers	Sacramento, California
Amherst College	Mammoths	Amherst, Massachusetts

=== AN ===
Institution	Nickname	Location
Anderson University	Ravens	Anderson, Indiana
Anderson University	Trojans	Anderson, South Carolina
Andrew College	Fighting Tigers	Cuthbert, Georgia
Andrews University	Cardinals	Berrien Springs, Michigan
Angelina College	Roadrunners	Lufkin, Texas
Angelo State University	Rams	San Angelo, Texas
Anna Maria College	Amcats	Paxton, Massachusetts
Anne Arundel Community College	Riverhawks	Arnold, Maryland
Antelope Valley College	Marauders	Lancaster, California
Antioch College	Radicals	Yellow Springs, Ohio

=== AO–AQ ===
Institution	Nickname	Location
Appalachian Bible College	Warriors	Mount Hope, West Virginia
Appalachian State University	Mountaineers	Boone, North Carolina
The Apprentice School	Builders	Newport News, Virginia
Aquinas College	Saints	Grand Rapids, Michigan
Aquinas College	Cavaliers	Nashville, Tennessee

=== AR ===
Institution	Nickname	Location
Arapahoe Community College	Pumas	Littleton, Colorado
Arcadia University	Knights	Glenside, Pennsylvania
University of Arizona	Wildcats	Tucson, Arizona
Arizona Christian University	Firestorm	Glendale, Arizona
Arizona State University	Sun Devils	Tempe, Arizona
Arizona Western College	Matadors	Yuma, Arizona
University of Arkansas	Razorbacks	Fayetteville, Arkansas
University of Arkansas Community College at Batesville	River Bandits	Batesville, Arkansas
University of Arkansas Community College at Morrilton	Timberwolves	Morrilton, Arkansas
University of Arkansas–Fort Smith	Lions	Fort Smith, Arkansas
University of Arkansas Hope-Texarkana	Iron Horse	Hope and Texarkana, Arkansas
University of Arkansas at Little Rock (Little Rock)	Trojans	Little Rock, Arkansas
University of Arkansas at Monticello	Boll Weevils and Cotton Blossoms	Monticello, Arkansas
University of Arkansas at Pine Bluff	Golden Lions	Pine Bluff, Arkansas
University of Arkansas Rich Mountain	Deer	Mena, Arkansas
Arkansas Baptist College	Buffaloes	Little Rock, Arkansas
Arkansas State University	Red Wolves	Jonesboro, Arkansas
Arkansas State University-Beebe	Vanguards	Beebe, Arkansas
Arkansas State University Mid-South	Greyhounds	West Memphis, Arkansas
Arkansas State University–Mountain Home	Trailblazers	Mountain Home, Arkansas
Arkansas State University Newport (ASU Newport)	Aviators	Newport, Arkansas
Arkansas Tech University	Wonder Boys and Golden Suns	Russellville, Arkansas
Arlington Baptist University	Patriots	Arlington, Texas
United States Military Academy (Army)	Black Knights	West Point, New York

=== AS ===
Institution	Nickname	Location
Asbury University	Eagles	Wilmore, Kentucky
Asheville–Buncombe Technical Community College	Trailblazers	Asheville, North Carolina
Ashland University	Eagles	Ashland, Ohio
Asnuntuck Community College	Corsairs	Enfield, Connecticut
Assumption University	Greyhounds	Worcester, Massachusetts

=== AT ===
Institution	Nickname	Location
Athens State University	Bears	Athens, Alabama
Athens Technical College	Owls	Athens, Georgia
Atlanta Metropolitan State College	Trailblazers	Atlanta, Georgia
Atlanta Technical College	Skyhawks	Atlanta, Georgia
Atlantic Cape Community College	Buccaneers	Mays Landing, New Jersey
Atlantis University	Atlanteans	Miami, Florida
A.T. Still University	Rams	Kirksville, Missouri

=== AU ===
Institution	Nickname	Location
Auburn University	Tigers	Auburn, Alabama
Auburn University at Montgomery	Warhawks	Montgomery, Alabama
Augsburg University	Auggies	Minneapolis, Minnesota
Augusta University	Jaguars	Augusta, Georgia
Augusta Technical College	Cougars	Augusta, Georgia
Augustana College	Vikings	Rock Island, Illinois
Augustana University	Vikings	Sioux Falls, South Dakota
Aurora University	Spartans	Aurora, Illinois
Austin College	Kangaroos	Sherman, Texas
Austin Community College	Riverbats	Austin, Texas
Austin Peay State University	Governors	Clarksville, Tennessee

=== AV–AZ ===
Institution	Nickname	Location
Ave Maria University	Gyrenes	Ave Maria, Florida
Averett University	Cougars	Danville, Virginia
Avila University	Eagles	Kansas City, Missouri
Azusa Pacific University	Cougars	Azusa, California

== B ==
=== BAB–BAP ===
Institution	Nickname	Location
Babson College	Beavers	Wellesley, Massachusetts
Baker University	Wildcats	Baldwin City, Kansas
Bakersfield College	Renegades	Bakersfield, California
Baldwin Wallace University	Yellow Jackets	Berea, Ohio
Baltimore City Community College	Panthers	Baltimore, Maryland
Ball State University	Cardinals	Muncie, Indiana
Baptist University of Florida	Eagles	Graceville, Florida

=== BAR–BAY ===
Institution	Nickname	Location
Barber–Scotia College	Mighty Sabres	Concord, North Carolina
Barclay College	Bears	Haviland, Kansas
Barnard College	Bears	New York City, New York
Bard College	Raptors	Annandale-on-Hudson, New York
Bard College at Simon's Rock	Llamas	Great Barrington, Massachusetts
Barry University	Buccaneers	Miami Shores, Florida
Barstow Community College	Vikings	Barstow, California
Barton College	Bulldogs	Wilson, North Carolina
Barton Community College	Cougars	Great Bend, Kansas
Baruch College	Bearcats	New York City, New York
Bates College	Bobcats	Lewiston, Maine
Baton Rouge Community College	Bears	Baton Rouge, Louisiana
Batten University	Marlins	Virginia Beach, Virginia
Bay College	Norse	Escanaba, Michigan
Baylor University	Bears	Waco, Texas
Bay Path University	Wildcats	Longmeadow, Massachusetts
Bay Ridge Christian College	Eagles	Fort Bend County, Texas

=== BEL–BEN ===
Institution	Nickname	Location
Belhaven University	Blazers	Jackson, Mississippi
Bellarmine University	Knights	Louisville, Kentucky
Bellevue College	Bulldogs	Bellevue, Washington
Bellevue University	Bruins	Bellevue, Nebraska
Belmont University	Bruins	Nashville, Tennessee
Belmont Abbey College	Crusaders	Belmont, North Carolina
Beloit College	Buccaneers	Beloit, Wisconsin
Bemidji State University	Beavers	Bemidji, Minnesota
Benedict College	Tigers	Columbia, South Carolina
Benedictine College	Ravens	Atchison, Kansas
Benedictine University	Eagles (Note: The athletics are mainly branded simply as Benedictine, but they may also be known as Benedictine–Lisle.)	Lisle, Illinois
Benedictine University	Redhawks (Note: It is branded as Benedictine Mesa.)	Mesa, Arizona
Bennett College	Belles	Greensboro, North Carolina
Bennington College	Goatboys	Bennington, Vermont
Bentley University	Falcons	Waltham, Massachusetts

=== BER–BEV ===
Institution	Nickname	Location
Berea College	Mountaineers	Berea, Kentucky
Bergen Community College	Bulldogs	Bergen County, New Jersey
Berkeley College	Knights	New York City, New York
Berkshire Community College	Falcons	Pittsfield, Massachusetts
Berry College	Vikings	Rome, Georgia
Bethany College	Swedes	Lindsborg, Kansas
Bethany College	Bison	Bethany, West Virginia
Bethany Lutheran College	Vikings	Mankato, Minnesota
Bethel College	Threshers	North Newton, Kansas
Bethel University	Pilots	Mishawaka, Indiana
Bethel University	Royals	Arden Hills, Minnesota
Bethel University	Wildcats	McKenzie, Tennessee
Bethesda University	Lion Angels	Anaheim, California
Bethune–Cookman University	Wildcats	Daytona Beach, Florida
Bevill State Community College	Bears	Sumiton, Alabama

=== BI ===
Institution	Nickname	Location
Big Bend Community College	Vikings	Moses Lake, Washington
Binghamton University	Bearcats	Vestal, New York
Biola University	Eagles	La Mirada, California
Bishop State Community College	Wildcats	Mobile, Alabama
Bismarck State College	Mystics	Bismarck, North Dakota

=== BL ===
Institution	Nickname	Location
Black Hawk College	Braves	Moline, Illinois
Black Hills State University	Yellow Jackets	Spearfish, South Dakota
Blackburn College	Battlin' Beavers	Carlinville, Illinois
Bladen Community College	Eagles	Dublin, North Carolina
Blinn College	Buccaneers	Brenham, Texas
Bloomfield College	Bears	Bloomfield, New Jersey
Bloomsburg University	Huskies	Bloomsburg, Pennsylvania
Blue Mountain Christian University	Toppers	Blue Mountain, Mississippi
Blue Mountain Community College	Timberwolves	Pendleton, Oregon
Blue Ridge Community College	Bears	Flat Rock, North Carolina
Bluefield University	Rams	Bluefield, Virginia
Bluefield State University	Big Blues and Lady Blues	Bluefield, West Virginia
Bluffton University	Beavers	Bluffton, Ohio

=== BO ===
Institution	Nickname	Location
Bob Jones University	Bruins	Greenville, South Carolina
Boise State University	Broncos	Boise, Idaho
Bossier Parish Community College	Cavaliers	Bossier City, Louisiana
Boston College	Eagles	Chestnut Hill, Massachusetts
Boston University	Terriers	Boston, Massachusetts
Bowdoin College	Polar Bears	Brunswick, Maine
Bowie State University	Bulldogs	Bowie, Maryland
Bowling Green State University	Falcons	Bowling Green, Ohio
Boyce College	Bulldogs	Louisville, Kentucky

=== BRA–BRI ===
Institution	Nickname	Location
Bradley University	Braves	Peoria, Illinois
Brandeis University	Judges	Waltham, Massachusetts
Brazosport College	Gators	Lake Jackson, Texas
Brenau University	Golden Tigers	Gainesville, Georgia
Brescia University	Bearcats	Owensboro, Kentucky
Brevard College	Tornadoes	Brevard, North Carolina
Brewton–Parker Christian University	Barons	Mount Vernon, Georgia
Briar Cliff University	Chargers	Sioux City, Iowa
University of Bridgeport	Purple Knights	Bridgeport, Connecticut
Bridgewater College	Eagles	Bridgewater, Virginia
Bridgewater State University	Bears	Bridgewater, Massachusetts
Brigham Young University (BYU)	Cougars	Provo, Utah
Brigham Young University–Idaho	Vikings	Rexburg, Idaho
Brightpoint Community College	Trailblazers	Chester, Virginia
Bristol Community College	Bayhawks	Bristol County, Massachusetts

=== BRO–BRY ===
Institution	Nickname	Location
Bronx Community College	Broncos	The Bronx, New York
Brookdale Community College	Blues	Lincroft, New Jersey
Dallas College Brookhaven	Bears	Farmers Branch, Texas
Brooklyn College	Bulldogs	Brooklyn, New York
Broward College	Seahawks	Fort Lauderdale, Florida
Brown University	Bears	Providence, Rhode Island
Brunswick Community College	Dolphins	Bolivia, North Carolina
Bryan College	Lions	Dayton, Tennessee
Bryant University	Bulldogs	Smithfield, Rhode Island
Bryant & Stratton College	Bobcats	Buffalo, New York
Bryn Mawr College	Owls	Bryn Mawr, Pennsylvania

=== BU ===
Institution	Nickname	Location
Bucknell University	Bison	Lewisburg, Pennsylvania
Bucks County Community College	Centurions	Bucks County, Pennsylvania
Buena Vista University	Beavers	Storm Lake, Iowa
University at Buffalo	Bulls	Buffalo, New York
Buffalo State University	Bengals	Buffalo, New York
Bunker Hill Community College	Bulldogs	Boston, Massachusetts
Bushnell University	Beacons	Eugene, Oregon
Butler Community College	Grizzlies	El Dorado, Kansas
Butler County Community College	Pioneers	Butler, Pennsylvania
Butler University	Bulldogs	Indianapolis, Indiana
Butte College	Roadrunners	Oroville, California

== C ==
=== CAB–CALH ===
Institution	Nickname	Location
Cabrillo College	Seahawks	Aptos, California
Cairn University	Highlanders	Langhorne Manor, Pennsylvania
Caldwell Community College & Technical Institute	Cobras	Hudson, North Carolina
Caldwell University	Cougars	Caldwell, New Jersey
Calhoun Community College	Warhawks	Decatur, Alabama

=== CALIFORNIA ===
Institution	Nickname	Location
University of California, Berkeley (California)	Golden Bears	Berkeley, California
University of California, Davis (UC Davis)	Aggies	Davis, California
University of California, Irvine (UC Irvine)	Anteaters	Irvine, California
University of California, Los Angeles (UCLA)	Bruins	Los Angeles, California
University of California, Merced (UC Merced)	Golden Bobcats	Merced, California
University of California, Riverside (UC Riverside)	Highlanders	Riverside, California
University of California, San Diego (UC San Diego)	Tritons	San Diego, California
University of California, San Francisco (UC San Francisco)	Bears	San Francisco, California
University of California, Santa Barbara (UC Santa Barbara)	Gauchos	Santa Barbara, California
University of California, Santa Cruz (UC Santa Cruz)	Banana Slugs	Santa Cruz, California
PennWest California (California) (Note: PWUC is part of Pennsylvania Western University and not of the University of California. Nonetheless, its athletics are known simply as California. It may be also known as California (PA) or PennWest California.)	Vulcans	California, Pennsylvania

=== CALIFORNIA B–CALIFORNIA L ===
Institution	Nickname	Location
California Baptist University	Lancers	Riverside, California
California Institute of Technology (Caltech)	Beavers	Pasadena, California
California Lutheran University	Kingsmen and Regals	Thousand Oaks, California

=== CALIFORNIA STATE ===
Institution	Nickname	Location
Cal Poly Maritime Academy	Keelhaulers	Vallejo, California
California Polytechnic State University, San Luis Obispo (Cal Poly)	Mustangs	San Luis Obispo, California
California State Polytechnic University, Humboldt (Cal Poly Humboldt)	Lumberjacks	Arcata, California
California State Polytechnic University, Pomona (Cal Poly Pomona)	Broncos	Pomona, California
California State University, Bakersfield (Cal State Bakersfield)	Roadrunners	Bakersfield, California
California State University, Channel Islands (Cal State Channel Islands)	Dolphins	Camarillo, California
California State University, Dominguez Hills (Cal State Dominguez Hills)	Toros	Carson, California
California State University, East Bay (Cal State East Bay)	Pioneers	Hayward, California
California State University, Fullerton (Cal State Fullerton)	Titans	Fullerton, California
California State University, Los Angeles (Cal State Los Angeles)	Golden Eagles	Los Angeles, California
California State University, Monterey Bay (Cal State Monterey Bay)	Otters	Seaside, California
California State University, Northridge (Cal State Northridge)	Matadors	Northridge, California
California State University, San Bernardino (Cal State San Bernardino)	Coyotes	San Bernardino, California
California State University, San Marcos (Cal State San Marcos)	Cougars	San Marcos, California
California State University, Chico (Chico State)	Wildcats	Chico, California
California State University, Fresno (Fresno State)	Bulldogs	Fresno, California
California State University, Long Beach (Long Beach State)	The Beach	Long Beach, California
California State University, Sacramento (Sacramento State)	Hornets	Sacramento, California
California State University, Stanislaus (Stanislaus State)	Warriors	Turlock, California

=== CALU–CAN ===
Institution	Nickname	Location
Calumet College of St. Joseph	Crimson Wave	Hammond, Indiana
Calvin University	Knights	Grand Rapids, Michigan
Campbell University	Fighting Camels	Buies Creek, North Carolina
Campbellsville University	Tigers	Campbellsville, Kentucky
Camden County College	Cougars	Blackwood, New Jersey
Cameron University	Aggies	Lawton, Oklahoma
Cañada College	Colts	Redwood City, California
Canisius University	Golden Griffins	Buffalo, New York
Cankdeska Cikana Community College	C4	Fort Totten, North Dakota
College of the Canyons	Cougars	Santa Clarita, California

=== CAP–CAR ===
Institution	Nickname	Location
Cape Cod Community College	Sharks	West Barnstable, Massachusetts
Cape Fear Community College	Sea Devils	Wilmington, North Carolina
Capital Community College	Commodores	Hartford, Connecticut
Capital University	Crusaders	Bexley, Ohio
Capitol Technology University	Chargers	South Laurel, Maryland
Carl Albert State College	Vikings	Poteau, Oklahoma
Carl Sandburg College	Chargers	Galesburg, Illinois
Carleton College	Knights	Northfield, Minnesota
Carlow University	Celtics	Pittsburgh, Pennsylvania
Carnegie Mellon University	Tartans	Pittsburgh, Pennsylvania
Carolina Christian College	Centurions	Winston-Salem, North Carolina
Carolina University	Bruins	Winston-Salem, North Carolina
Carroll College	Fighting Saints	Helena, Montana
Carroll Community College	Lynx	Westminster, Maryland
Carroll University	Pioneers	Waukesha, Wisconsin
Carson–Newman University	Eagles	Jefferson City, Tennessee
Carthage College	Firebirds	Kenosha, Wisconsin

=== CAS–CAY ===
Institution	Nickname	Location
Cascadia College	Kodiaks	Bothell, Washington
Case Western Reserve University	Spartans	Cleveland, Ohio
Casper College	Thunderbirds	Casper, Wyoming
Catawba College	Indians	Salisbury, North Carolina
Catawba Valley Community College	Red Hawks	Hickory, North Carolina
Catholic University of America	Cardinals	Washington, D.C.
Cayuga Community College	Spartans	Auburn, New York

=== CC ===
Institution	Nickname	Location
Community College of Allegheny County	Wildcats	Allegheny County, Pennsylvania
Community College of Aurora	Red Foxes	Aurora, Colorado
Community College of Baltimore County	Lions	Dundalk, Maryland
Community College of Baltimore County	Knights	Essex, Maryland
Community College of Denver	CityHawks	Denver, Colorado
Community College of Philadelphia	Lions	Philadelphia, Pennsylvania
Community College of Rhode Island	Knights	Warwick, Rhode Island
Community Colleges of Spokane	Sasquatch	Spokane, Washington

=== CEC–CENTE ===
Institution	Nickname	Location
Cecil College	Seahawks	North East, Maryland
Cedar Crest College	Falcons	Allentown, Pennsylvania
Dallas College Cedar Valley	Suns	Lancaster, Texas
Cedarville University	Yellow Jackets	Cedarville, Ohio
Centenary College of Louisiana	Gentlemen and Ladies	Shreveport, Louisiana
Centenary University	Cyclones	Hackettstown, New Jersey

=== CENTRAL–CENTRAL L ===
Institution	Nickname	Location
Central College	Dutch	Pella, Iowa
Central College	Eagles	Houston, Texas
Central Alabama Community College	Trojans	Alexander City, Alabama
Central Arizona College	Vaqueros	Coolidge, Arizona
University of Central Arkansas	Bears and Sugar Bears	Conway, Arkansas
Central Baptist College	Mustangs and Lady Mustangs	Conway, Arkansas
Central Bible College	Spartans	Springfield Missouri
Central Carolina Community College	Cougars	Sanford, North Carolina
Central Carolina Technical College	Titans	Sumter, South Carolina
Central Community College	Raiders	Columbus, Nebraska
Central Connecticut State University	Blue Devils	New Britain, Connecticut
College of Central Florida	Patriots	Ocala, Florida
University of Central Florida (UCF)	Knights	Orlando, Florida
Central Christian College of Kansas	Tigers	McPherson, Kansas
Central Christian College of the Bible	Saints	Moberly, Missouri
Central Georgia Technical College	Titans	Warner Robins, Georgia
Central Lakes College	Raiders	Brainerd, Minnesota

=== CENTRAL M–CENTRAL W ===
Institution	Nickname	Location
Central Maine Community College	Mustangs	Auburn, Maine
Central Methodist University	Eagles	Fayette, Missouri
Central Michigan University	Chippewas	Mount Pleasant, Michigan
University of Central Missouri	Mules and Jennies	Warrensburg, Missouri
Central New Mexico Community College	Cats	Albuquerque, New Mexico
Central Ohio Technical College	Titans	Newark, Ohio
University of Central Oklahoma	Bronchos	Edmond, Oklahoma
Central Oregon Community College	Bobcats	Bend, Oregon
Central Penn College	Knights	Summerdale, Pennsylvania
Central Piedmont Community College	Tigers	Charlotte, North Carolina
Central State University	Marauders and Lady Marauders	Wilberforce, Ohio
Central Texas College	Eagles	Killeen, Texas
Central Washington University	Wildcats	Ellensburg, Washington
Central Wyoming College	Rustlers	Riverton, Wyoming

=== CENTRALI–CER ===
Institution	Nickname	Location
Centralia College	Trailblazers	Centralia, Washington
Centre College	Colonels	Danville, Kentucky
Century College	Wood Ducks	White Bear Lake, Minnesota
Cerritos College	Falcons	Norwalk, California
Cerro Coso Community College	Coyotes	Ridgecrest, California

=== CHA ===
Institution	Nickname	Location
Chabot College	Gladiators	Hayward, California
Chadron State College	Eagles	Chadron, Nebraska
Chaffey College	Panthers	Rancho Cucamonga, California
Chaminade University of Honolulu	Silverswords	Honolulu, Hawaii
Champion Christian College	Tigers	Hot Springs, Arkansas
Champlain College	Beavers	Burlington, Vermont
Chapman University	Panthers	Orange, California
Chandler–Gilbert Community College	Coyotes	Chandler, Arizona
Chatham University	Cougars	Pittsburgh, Pennsylvania
College of Charleston	Cougars	Charleston, South Carolina
University of Charleston	Golden Eagles	Charleston, West Virginia
Charleston Southern University	Buccaneers	North Charleston, South Carolina
Chattahoochee Technical College	Golden Eagles	Marietta, Georgia
Chattahoochee Valley Community College	Pirates	Phenix City, Alabama
University of Tennessee at Chattanooga	Mocs	Chattanooga, Tennessee

=== CHE–CHR ===
Institution	Nickname	Location
Chemeketa Community College	Storm	Salem, Oregon
Chesapeake College	Skipjacks	Wye Mills, Maryland
Chestnut Hill College	Griffins	Philadelphia, Pennsylvania
Cheyney University	Wolves	Cheyney, Pennsylvania
University of Chicago	Maroons	Chicago, Illinois
Chicago State University	Cougars	Chicago, Illinois
Chipola College	Indians	Marianna, Florida
Chowan University	Hawks	Murfreesboro, North Carolina
Christendom College	Crusaders	Front Royal, Virginia
Christian Brothers University	Buccaneers and Lady Buccaneers	Memphis, Tennessee
Christopher Newport University	Captains	Newport News, Virginia

=== CI ===
Institution	Nickname	Location
University of Cincinnati	Bearcats	Cincinnati, Ohio
University of Cincinnati Clermont College	Cougars	Batavia, Ohio
Cincinnati State Technical and Community College	Surge	Cincinnati, Ohio
Cisco College	Wranglers	Abilene, Texas
The Citadel	Bulldogs	Charleston, South Carolina
Citrus College	Owls	Glendora, California
City College of New York (CCNY)	Beavers	New York City, New York
City College of San Francisco (CCSF)	Rams	San Francisco, California

=== CL ===
Institution	Nickname	Location
Clackamas Community College	Cougars	Oregon City, Oregon
Claflin University	Panthers	Orangeburg, South Carolina
Clarendon College	Bulldogs	Clarendon, Texas
Claremont McKenna College	Stags and Athenas (Note: This is the joint intercollegiate sports program of Claremont McKenna College, Harvey Mudd College, and Scripps College. It is branded as Claremont-Mudd-Scripps.)	Claremont, California
PennWest Clarion (Clarion)	Golden Eagles	Clarion, Pennsylvania
Clark Atlanta University	Panthers	Atlanta, Georgia
Clark College	Penguins	Vancouver, Washington
Clark State College	Eagles	Springfield, Ohio
Clark University	Cougars	Worcester, Massachusetts
Clarke University	Pride	Dubuque, Iowa
Clarkson University	Golden Knights	Potsdam, New York
Clatsop Community College	Bandits	Astoria, Oregon
Clayton State University	Lakers	Morrow, Georgia
Cleary University	Cougars	Genoa Township, Michigan
Clemson University	Tigers	Clemson, South Carolina
Cleveland Community College	Yetis	Shelby, North Carolina
Cleveland State Community College	Cougars	Cleveland, Tennessee
Cleveland State University	Vikings	Cleveland, Ohio
Clinton College	Golden Bears	Rock Hill, South Carolina
Clinton Community College	Cougars	Plattsburgh, New York
Cloud County Community College	Thunderbirds	Concordia, Kansas
Clovis Community College	Crush	Fresno, California

=== COA–COK ===
Institution	Nickname	Location
Coahoma Community College	Tigers	Coahoma County, Mississippi
Coalinga College	Falcons	Coalinga, California
United States Coast Guard Academy (Coast Guard)	Bears	New London, Connecticut
Coastal Bend College	Cougars	Beeville, Texas
Coastal Alabama Community College	Coyotes	Various (Note: It has campuses in Atmore; Bay Minette; Brewton; Fairhope; Foley; Gilbertown; Gulf Shores; Mobile; Monroeville and Thomasville, Alabama.)
Coastal Carolina Community College	Cougars	Jacksonville, North Carolina
Coastal Carolina University	Chanticleers	Conway, South Carolina
College of Coastal Georgia	Mariners	Brunswick, Georgia
Coastal Pines Technical College	Rays	Waycross, Georgia
Coastline College	Dolphins	Fountain Valley, California
Cochise College	Apaches	Sierra Vista, Arizona
Coconino Community College	Comets	Flagstaff, Arizona
Coe College	Kohawks	Cedar Rapids, Iowa
Coffeyville Community College	Red Ravens	Coffeyville, Kansas
Coker University	Cobras	Hartsville, South Carolina

=== COL–COLO ===
Institution	Nickname	Location
Colby College	Mules	Waterville, Maine
Colby Community College	Trojans	Colby, Kansas
Colby–Sawyer College	Chargers	New London, New Hampshire
Colgate University	Raiders	Hamilton, New York
College of Biblical Studies	Ambassadors	Houston, Texas
College of Idaho	Coyotes	Caldwell, Idaho
The College of New Jersey (TCNJ)	Lions	Ewing, New Jersey
Collin College	Cougars	Collin County, Texas
University of Colorado Boulder	Buffaloes	Boulder, Colorado
Colorado Christian University	Cougars	Lakewood, Colorado
Colorado College	Tigers	Colorado Springs, Colorado
University of Colorado Colorado Springs (UCCS)	Mountain Lions	Colorado Springs, Colorado
University of Colorado Denver	Lynx	Denver, Colorado
Colorado Mesa University	Mavericks	Grand Junction, Colorado
Colorado School of Mines (Colorado Mines)	Orediggers	Golden, Colorado
Colorado Mountain College	Eagles	Glenwood Springs, Colorado
Colorado Northwestern Community College	Spartans	Rangely, Colorado
Colorado State University	Rams	Fort Collins, Colorado
Colorado State University–Global Campus	Golden Eagles	Aurora, Colorado
Colorado State University Pueblo	ThunderWolves	Pueblo, Colorado

=== COLU ===
Institution	Nickname	Location
Columbia Basin College	Hawks	Pasco, Washington
Columbia College	Claim Jumpers	Sonora, California
Columbia College	Cougars	Columbia, Missouri
Columbia College	Koalas	Columbia, South Carolina
Columbia College Chicago	Renegades	Chicago, Illinois
Columbia Gorge Community College	Fighting Salmon	The Dalles, Oregon
Columbia University	Lions	New York City, New York
Columbia–Greene Community College	Twins	Hudson, New York
Columbia International University (CIU)	Rams	Columbia, South Carolina
Columbia Southern University	Knights	Orange Beach, Alabama
Columbus State Community College	Cougars	Columbus, Ohio
Columbus State University	Cougars	Columbus, Georgia

=== COM–CONC ===
Institution	Nickname	Location
Commonwealth University-Bloomsburg	Huskies	Bloomsburg, Pennsylvania
Commonwealth University-Lock Haven	Bald Eagles	Lock Haven, Pennsylvania
Commonwealth University-Mansfield	Mountaineers	Mansfield, Pennsylvania
Compton College	Tartans	Compton, California
Concord University	Mountain Lions	Athens, West Virginia
Concordia College	Cobbers	Moorhead, Minnesota
Concordia University Ann Arbor	Cardinals	Ann Arbor, Michigan
Concordia University Chicago	Cougars	Chicago, Illinois
Concordia University Irvine	Golden Eagles	Irvine, California
Concordia University Nebraska	Bulldogs	Seward, Nebraska
Concordia University, St. Paul	Golden Bears	Saint Paul, Minnesota
Concordia University Texas	Tornados	Austin, Texas
Concordia University Wisconsin	Falcons	Mequon, Wisconsin
Concordia Seminary	Preachers	Clayton, Missouri

=== CONN–COP ===
Institution	Nickname	Location
University of Connecticut (UConn)	Huskies	Storrs, Connecticut
Connecticut College	Camels	New London, Connecticut
Connecticut State Community College Housatonic	Hawks	Bridgeport, Connecticut
Connors State College	Cowboys	Warner, Oklahoma
Contra Costa College	Comets	San Pablo, California
Converse University	Valkyries	Spartanburg, South Carolina
Copiah–Lincoln Community College	Wolves	Wesson, Mississippi
Copper Mountain College	Fighting Cacti	Joshua Tree, California
Coppin State University	Eagles	Baltimore, Maryland

=== COR–COW ===
Institution	Nickname	Location
Corban University	Warriors	Salem, Oregon
Cornell College	Rams	Mount Vernon, Iowa
Cornell University	Big Red	Ithaca, New York
Cornerstone University	Golden Eagles	Grand Rapids, Michigan
Corning Community College	Red Barons	Corning, New York
Cossatot Community College	Colts	De Queen, Arkansas
Cosumnes River College	Hawks	Sacramento, California
College for Creative Studies	Peacocks	Detroit, Michigan
Cottey College	Comets	Nevada, Missouri
County College of Morris	Titans	Randolph, New Jersey
Covenant College	Scots	Lookout Mountain, Georgia
Cowley Community College	Tigers	Arkansas City, Kansas

=== CR ===
Institution	Nickname	Location
Crafton Hills College	Roadrunners	Yucaipa, California
Creighton University	Bluejays	Omaha, Nebraska
Crowder College	Roughriders	Neosho, Missouri
Crowley's Ridge College	Pioneers	Paragould, Arkansas
Crown College	Polars	St. Bonifacius, Minnesota

=== CU–CY ===
Institution	Nickname	Location
Cuesta College	Cougars	San Luis Obispo, California
The Culinary Institute of America	Steels	Hyde Park, New York
Culver–Stockton College	Wildcats	Canton, Missouri
Cumberland University	Phoenix	Lebanon, Tennessee
University of the Cumberlands	Patriots	Williamsburg, Kentucky
Curry College	Colonels	Milton, Massachusetts
Cuyahoga Community College	Triceratops	Cuyahoga County, Ohio
Cuyamaca College	Coyotes	Rancho San Diego, California
Cypress College	Chargers	Cypress, California

== D ==
=== DA ===
Institution	Nickname	Location
Daemen University	Wildcats	Amherst, New York
Dakota College at Bottineau	Lumberjacks	Bottineau, North Dakota
Dakota County Technical College	Blue Knights	Rosemount, Minnesota
Dakota State University	Trojans	Madison, South Dakota
Dakota Wesleyan University	Tigers	Mitchell, South Dakota
Richard J. Daley College	Bulldogs	Chicago, Illinois
University of Dallas	Crusaders	Irving, Texas
Dallas Baptist University	Patriots	Dallas, Texas
Dallas Christian College	Crusaders	Farmers Branch, Texas
Dalton State College	Roadrunners	Dalton, Georgia
Danville Community College	Knights	Danville, Virginia
Danville Area Community College	Jaguars	Danville, Illinois
Dartmouth College	Big Green	Hanover, New Hampshire
Davis & Elkins College	Senators	Elkins, West Virginia
Davenport University	Panthers	Grand Rapids, Michigan
Davidson College	Wildcats	Davidson, North Carolina
Davidson-Davie Community College	Storm	Lexington, North Carolina
Davis College	Falcons	Pottersville, New York
Dawson Community College	Buccaneers	Glendive, Montana
University of Dayton	Flyers	Dayton, Ohio
Daytona State College	Falcons	Daytona Beach, Florida

=== DE–DEL ===
Institution	Nickname	Location
De Anza College	Mountain Lions	Cupertino, California
Dean College	Bulldogs	Franklin, Massachusetts
Defiance College	Yellow Jackets	Defiance, Ohio
Del Mar College	Vikings	Corpus Christi, Texas
University of Delaware	Fightin' Blue Hens	Newark, Delaware
Delaware County Community College	Phantoms	Marple Township, Pennsylvania
Delaware State University	Hornets	Dover, Delaware
Delaware Technical Community College	Roadrunners	Georgetown, Delaware
Delaware Technical Community College	Spirit	Stanton, Delaware
Delaware Technical Community College	Hawks	Dover, Delaware
Delaware Valley University	Aggies	Doylestown, Pennsylvania
Delgado Community College	Dolphins	New Orleans, Louisiana
Delta College	Pioneers	University Center, Michigan
Delta State University	Statesmen and Lady Statesmen	Cleveland, Mississippi

=== DEN–DET ===
Institution	Nickname	Location
Denison University	Big Red	Granville, Ohio
Denmark Technical College	Panthers	Denmark, South Carolina
University of Denver	Pioneers	Denver, Colorado
DePaul University	Blue Demons	Chicago, Illinois
DePauw University	Tigers	Greencastle, Indiana
Des Moines Area Community College	Bears	Various (Note: It has campuses in Ankeny; Boone; Carroll; Newton; Des Moines and West Des Moines, Iowa.)
DeSales University	Bulldogs	Center Valley, Pennsylvania
College of the Desert	Roadrunners	Palm Desert, California
University of Detroit Mercy	Titans	Detroit, Michigan

=== DI–DO ===
Institution	Nickname	Location
Diablo Valley College	Vikings	Pleasant Hill, California
Dickinson College	Red Devils	Carlisle, Pennsylvania
Dickinson State University	Blue Hawks	Dickinson, North Dakota
Dillard University	Bleu Devils and Lady Bleu Devils	New Orleans, Louis
Diné College	Warriors	Tsaile, Arizona
University of the District of Columbia	Firebirds	Washington, D.C.
Doane University	Tigers	Crete, Nebraska
Dodge City Community College	Conquistadors	Dodge City, Kansas
Dominican University	Stars	River Forest, Illinois
Dominican University of California	Penguins	San Rafael, California
Dominican University New York	Chargers	Orangeburg, New York
Donnelly College	Dragons	Kansas City, Kansas
Dordt University	Defenders	Sioux Center, Iowa

=== DR ===
Institution	Nickname	Location
Drake University	Bulldogs	Des Moines, Iowa
J.F. Drake State Community and Technical College (Drake State)	Blue Eagles	Huntsville, Alabama
Drew University	Rangers	Madison, New Jersey
Drexel University	Dragons	Philadelphia, Pennsylvania
Drury University	Panthers	Springfield, Missouri

=== DU–DY ===
Institution	Nickname	Location
Duke University	Blue Devils	Durham, North Carolina
University of Dubuque	Spartans	Dubuque, Iowa
College of DuPage	Chaparrals	Glen Ellyn, Illinois
Duquesne University	Dukes	Pittsburgh, Pennsylvania
Dutchess Community College	Falcons	Poughkeepsie Town, New York
Dyersburg State Community College	Eagles	Dyersburg, Tennessee
D'Youville University	Saints	Buffalo, New York

== E ==
=== EAR–EAST ===
Institution	Nickname	Location
Earlham College	Hustlin' Quakers	Richmond, Indiana
East Carolina University	Pirates	Greenville, North Carolina
East Central College	Falcons	Union, Missouri
East Central University	Tigers	Ada, Oklahoma
East Central Community College	Warriors	Decatur, Mississippi
ECPI University	Rams	Virginia Beach, Virginia
East Los Angeles College	Huskies	Monterey Park, California
East Mississippi Community College	Lions	Scooba, Mississippi
East Stroudsburg University	Warriors	East Stroudsburg, Pennsylvania
East Tennessee State University	Buccaneers	Johnson City, Tennessee
East Texas A&M University	Lions	Commerce, Texas
East Texas Baptist University	Tigers	Marshall, Texas
East–West University	Phantoms	Chicago, Illinois

=== EASTERN–EB ===
Institution	Nickname	Location
Eastern University	Eagles	St. Davids, Pennsylvania
Eastern Arizona College	Gila Monsters	Thatcher, Arizona
Eastern Connecticut State University	Warriors	Willimantic, Connecticut
Eastern Florida State College	Titans	Cocoa, Florida
College of Eastern Idaho	Falcons	Idaho Falls, Idaho
Eastern Illinois University	Panthers	Charleston, Illinois
Eastern Kentucky University	Colonels	Richmond, Kentucky
Eastern Mennonite University	Royals	Harrisonburg, Virginia
Eastern Michigan University	Eagles	Ypsilanti, Michigan
Eastern New Mexico University	Greyhounds	Portales, New Mexico
Eastern Oklahoma State College	Mountaineers	Wilburton, Oklahoma
Eastern Oregon University	Mountaineers	La Grande, Oregon
Eastern Washington University	Eagles	Cheney, Washington
Eastern Wyoming College	Lancers	Torrington and Douglas, Wyoming
Dallas College Eastfield (Eastfield)	Harvesters	Mesquite, Texas

=== EC–ED ===
Institution	Nickname	Location
Ecclesia College	Royals	Springdale, Arkansas
Eckerd College	Tritons	St. Petersburg, Florida
Edgewood University	Eagles	Madison, Wisconsin
PennWest Edinboro (Edinboro)	Fighting Scots	Edinboro, Pennsylvania
Edison State Community College	Chargers	Piqua, Ohio
Edmonds College	Tritons	Lynnwood, Washington
Edward Waters University	Tigers and Lady Tigers	Jacksonville, Florida

=== EL ===
Institution	Nickname	Location
El Camino College	Warriors	Alondra Park, California
El Paso Community College	Tejanos and Tejanas	El Paso, Texas
Elgin Community College	Spartans	Elgin, Illinois
Elizabeth City State University	Vikings	Elizabeth City, North Carolina
Elizabethtown College	Blue Jays	Elizabethtown, Pennsylvania
Ellsworth Community College	Panthers	Iowa Falls, Iowa
Elmhurst University	Bluejays	Elmhurst, Illinois
Elmira College	Soaring Eagles	Elmira, New York
Elms College	Blazers	Chicopee, Massachusetts
Elon University	Phoenix	Elon, North Carolina

=== EM ===
Institution	Nickname	Location
Embry–Riddle Aeronautical University	Eagles	Daytona Beach, Florida Prescott, Arizona
Emerson College	Lions	Boston, Massachusetts
Emmanuel College	Saints	Boston, Massachusetts
Emmanuel University	Lions	Franklin Springs, Georgia
Emmaus University	Eagles	Dubuque, Iowa
Emory University	Eagles	Atlanta, Georgia
Emory and Henry University	Wasps	Emory, Virginia
Empire State University	Bluebirds	Saratoga Springs, New York
Emporia State University	Hornets	Emporia, Kansas

=== EN–EV ===
Institution	Nickname	Location
Endicott College	Gulls	Beverly, Massachusetts
Enterprise State Community College	Boll Weevils	Enterprise, Alabama
Erskine College	Flying Fleet	Due West, South Carolina
Essex County College	Wolverines	Newark, New Jersey
Estrella Mountain Community College (Estrella)	Mountain Lions	Avondale, Arizona
Eureka College	Red Devils	Eureka, Illinois
Evangel University	Crusaders	Springfield, Missouri
University of Evansville	Purple Aces	Evansville, Indiana
Everett Community College	Trojans	Everett, Washington
Everglades University	Egrets	Various (Note: It has campuses in Boca Raton; Miami; Orlando; Sarasota and Tampa, Florida.)
Evergreen State College	Geoducks	Olympia, Washington
Evergreen Valley College	Hawks	Evergreen, California

== F ==
=== FA ===
Institution	Nickname	Location
Fairfax University of America	Tigers	Fairfax, Virginia
Fairleigh Dickinson University	Knights	Teaneck, New Jersey
Fairleigh Dickinson University	Devils	Florham Park, New Jersey
Fairfield University	Stags	Fairfield, Connecticut
Fairmont State University	Fighting Falcons	Fairmont, West Virginia
Faith Baptist Bible College and Theological Seminary	Eagles	Ankeny, Iowa
Farmingdale State College	Rams	East Farmingdale, New York
Fashion Institute of Technology (FIT)	Tigers	New York City, New York
Faulkner University	Eagles	Montgomery, Alabama
Fayetteville State University	Broncos and Lady Broncos	Fayetteville, North Carolina
Fayetteville Technical Community College	Trojans	Fayetteville, North Carolina

=== FE–FI ===
Institution	Nickname	Location
Feather River College	Golden Eagles	Quincy, California
Felician University	Golden Falcons	Lodi and Rutherford, New Jersey
Ferris State University	Bulldogs	Big Rapids, Michigan
Ferrum College	Panthers	Ferrum, Virginia
University of Findlay	Oilers	Findlay, Ohio
Finger Lakes Community College	Lakers	Canandaigua, New York
Fisher College	Falcons	Boston, Massachusetts
Fisk University	Bulldogs	Nashville, Tennessee
Fitchburg State University	Falcons	Fitchburg, Massachusetts
Five Towns College	Sound	Dix Hills, New York

=== FL ===
Institution	Nickname	Location
Flagler College	Saints	St. Augustine, Florida
Florence–Darlington Technical College	Stingers	Florence, South Carolina
University of Florida	Gators	Gainesville, Florida
Florida A&M University	Rattlers and Lady Rattlers	Tallahassee, Florida
Florida Atlantic University	Owls	Boca Raton, Florida
Florida College	Falcons	Temple Terrace, Florida
Florida Gateway College	Timberwolves	Lake City, Florida
Florida Gulf Coast University	Eagles	Fort Myers, Florida
College of the Florida Keys	Tugas	Key West, Florida
Florida International University (FIU)	Panthers	University Park, Florida
Florida Memorial University	Lions	Miami Gardens, Florida
Florida National University	Conquistadors	Hialeah, Florida
Florida Polytechnic University	Phoenix	Lakeland, Florida
Florida Southern College	Moccasins	Lakeland, Florida
Florida SouthWestern State College	Buccaneers	Fort Myers, Florida
Florida State College at Jacksonville	Manta Rays	Jacksonville, Florida
Florida State University	Seminoles	Tallahassee, Florida
Florida Institute of Technology	Panthers	Melbourne, Florida

=== FO ===
Institution	Nickname	Location
Folsom Lake College	Falcons	Folsom, California
Fond du Lac Tribal and Community College	Thunder	Cloquet, Minnesota
Foothill College	Owls	Los Altos Hills, California
Fordham University	Rams	The Bronx, New York
Forsyth Technical Community College	Trailblazers	Winston-Salem, North Carolina
Fort Hays State University	Tigers	Hays, Kansas
Fort Hays Tech North Central	Trailblazers	Beloit, Kansas
University of Fort Lauderdale	Eagles	Lauderhill, Florida
Fort Lewis College	Skyhawks	Durango, Colorado
Fort Scott Community College	Greyhounds	Fort Scott, Kansas
Fort Valley State University	Wildcats	Fort Valley, Georgia
Fox Valley Technical College	Foxes	Grand Chute, Wisconsin

=== FR–FU ===
Institution	Nickname	Location
Framingham State University	Rams	Framingham, Massachusetts
Francis Marion University	Patriots	Florence, South Carolina
Franciscan University of Steubenville	Barons	Steubenville, Ohio
Franciscan Missionaries of Our Lady University	Wolves	Baton Rouge, Louisiana
Frank Phillips College	Plainsmen	Borger, Texas
Franklin College	Grizzlies	Franklin, Indiana
Franklin University	Raiders	Columbus, Ohio
Franklin & Marshall College	Diplomats	Lancaster, Pennsylvania
Franklin Pierce University	Ravens	Rindge, New Hampshire
Frederick Community College	Cougars	Frederick, Maryland
Free Lutheran Bible College and Seminary	Conquerors	Plymouth, Minnesota
Freed–Hardeman University	Lions and Lady Lions	Henderson, Tennessee
Fresno City College	Rams	Fresno, California
Fresno Pacific University	Sunbirds	Fresno, California
Friends University	Falcons	Wichita, Kansas
Front Range Community College	Wolves	Westminster, Colorado
Frostburg State University	Bobcats	Frostburg, Maryland
Fullerton College	Hornets	Fullerton, California
Fulton–Montgomery Community College	Raiders	Johnstown, New York
Furman University	Paladins	Greenville, South Carolina

== G ==
=== GA ===
Institution	Nickname	Location
Gadsden State Community College	Cardinals	Various (Note: It has campuses in Gadsden; Anniston and Centre, Alabama.)
Gallaudet University	Bison	Washington, D.C.
Galveston College	Whitecaps	Galveston, Texas
Gannon University	Golden Knights	Erie, Pennsylvania
Garden City Community College	Broncbusters	Garden City, Kansas
Gardner–Webb University	Runnin' Bulldogs	Boiling Springs, North Carolina
Garrett College	Lakers	McHenry, Maryland
Gateway Community College	Lions	New Haven, Connecticut
GateWay Community College	Geckos	Phoenix, Arizona
Gateway Technical College	Red Hawks	Various (Note: It has campuses in Kenosha; Racine and Elkhorn, Wisconsin.)
Gavilan College	Rams	Gilroy, California

=== GE ===
Institution	Nickname	Location
Genesee Community College	Cougars	Batavia, New York
Geneva College	Golden Tornadoes	Beaver Falls, Pennsylvania
George Fox University	Bruins	Newberg, Oregon
George Mason University	Patriots	George Mason, Virginia
George Washington University	Revolutionaries	Washington, D.C.
Georgetown College	Tigers	Georgetown, Kentucky
Georgetown University	Hoyas	Washington, D.C.
University of Georgia	Bulldogs	Athens, Georgia
Georgia College & State University (Georgia College)	Bobcats	Milledgeville, Georgia
Georgia Gwinnett College	Grizzlies	Lawrenceville, Georgia
Georgia Highlands College	Chargers	Floyd County, Georgia
Georgia Northwestern Technical College	Bobcats	Various (Note: It has campuses in Ringgold; Rock Spring; Rome; Calhoun; Rockmart and Dalton, Georgia.)
Georgia Southern University	Eagles	Statesboro, Georgia
Georgia Southern University–Armstrong Campus	Pirates	Savannah, Georgia
Georgia Southern University–East Georgia Campus	Golden Eagles	Swainsboro, Georgia
Georgia Southwestern State University	Hurricanes	Americus, Georgia
Georgia State University	Panthers	Atlanta, Georgia
Georgia Tech	Yellow Jackets	Atlanta, Georgia
Georgian Court University	Lions	Lakewood Township, New Jersey
Gettysburg College	Bullets	Gettysburg, Pennsylvania

=== GI–GO ===
Institution	Nickname	Location
Gillette College	Pronghorns	Gillette, Wyoming
Glendale Community College	Gauchos	Glendale, Arizona
Glendale Community College	Vaqueros	Glendale, California
Glenville State University	Pioneers	Glenville, West Virginia
Gogebic Community College	Samsons	Ironwood, Michigan
Golden Gate University	Griffins	San Francisco, California
Golden State Baptist College	Bears	Santa Clara, California
Golden West College	Rustlers	Huntington Beach, California
Goldey–Beacom College	Lightning	Wilmington, Delaware
Gonzaga University	Bulldogs	Spokane, Washington
Goodwin University	Navigators	East Hartford, Connecticut
Gordon College	Fighting Scots	Wenham, Massachusetts
Gordon State College	Highlanders	Barnesville, Georgia
Goshen College	Maple Leafs	Goshen, Indiana
Goucher College	Gophers	Towson, Maryland
Governors State University	Jaguars	University Park, Illinois

=== GR ===
Institution	Nickname	Location
Grace Christian University	Tigers	Grand Rapids, Michigan
Grace College & Seminary	Lancers	Winona Lake, Indiana
Grace University	Talons	Pomona, California
Graceland University	Yellowjackets	Lamoni, Iowa
Grambling State University	Tigers and Lady Tigers	Grambling, Louisiana
Grand Canyon University	Antelopes (Note: They are also known as Lopes.)	Phoenix, Arizona
Grand Rapids Community College	Raiders	Grand Rapids, Michigan
Grand Valley State University	Lakers	Allendale, Michigan
Grand View University	Vikings	Des Moines, Iowa
Grays Harbor College	Chokers	Aberdeen, Washington
Grayson College	Vikings	Denison, Texas
Great Basin College	Rams	Elko, Nevada
Great Bay Community College	Herons	Portsmouth, New Hampshire
Great Lakes Christian College	Crusaders	Delta Charter Township, Michigan
Green River College	Gators	Auburn, Washington
Greensboro College	Pride	Greensboro, North Carolina
Greenville University	Panthers	Greenville, Illinois
Grinnell College	Pioneers	Grinnell, Iowa
Grossmont College	Griffins	El Cajon, California
Grove City College	Wolverines	Grove City, Pennsylvania

=== GU–GW ===
Institution	Nickname	Location
Guilford College	Quakers	Greensboro, North Carolina
Guilford Technical Community College	Titans	Various (Note: It has campuses in Jamestown; Greensboro; High Point and Colfax, North Carolina.)
Gulf Coast State College	Commodores	Panama City, Florida
Gustavus Adolphus College	Golden Gusties	St. Peter, Minnesota
Guttman Community College	Grizzlies	New York City, New York
Gwynedd Mercy University	Griffins	Gwynedd Valley, Pennsylvania

== H ==
=== HAG–HAN ===
Institution	Nickname	Location
Hagerstown Community College	Hawks	Hagerstown, Maryland
Halifax Community College	Knights	Weldon, North Carolina
Hamilton College	Continentals	Kirkland, New York
Hamline University	Pipers	Saint Paul, Minnesota
Hampton University	Pirates and Lady Pirates	Hampton, Virginia
Hampden–Sydney College	Tigers	Hampden Sydney, Virginia
Hampshire College	Black Sheep	Amherst, Massachusetts
Hannibal–LaGrange University	Trojans	Hannibal, Missouri
Hanover College	Panthers	Hanover, Indiana

=== HAR ===
Institution	Nickname	Location
Harcum College	Bears	Bryn Mawr, Pennsylvania
Hardin–Simmons University	Cowboys and Cowgirls	Abilene, Texas
Harding University	Bisons	Searcy, Arkansas
Harford Community College	Fighting Owls	Bel Air, Maryland
Harper College	Hawks	Palatine, Illinois
Harris–Stowe State University	Hornets	St. Louis, Missouri
Harrisburg Area Community College	Hawks	Harrisburg, Pennsylvania
Harrisburg University of Science and Technology (Harrisburg)	Storm	Harrisburg, Pennsylvania
University of Hartford	Hawks	West Hartford, Connecticut
Hartnell College	Panthers	Salinas, California
Hartwick College	Hawks	Oneonta, New York
Harvard University	Crimson	Cambridge, Massachusetts
Harvey Mudd College	Stags and Athenas	Claremont, California

=== HAS–HE ===
Institution	Nickname	Location
Haskell Indian Nations University	Fighting Indians	Lawrence, Kansas
Hastings College	Broncos	Hastings, Nebraska
University of Hawaiʻi at Mānoa (Hawaii)	Rainbow Warriors and Rainbow Wāhine	Honolulu, Hawaii
University of Hawaiʻi at Hilo	Vulcans	Hilo, Hawaii
Hawaiʻi Pacific University	Sharks	Honolulu, Hawaii
University of Hawaiʻi at West Oʻahu (UHWO)	Owls	Kapolei, Hawaii
Hawkeye Community College	RedTails (Note: They are also known as Red-Tailed Hawks.)	Waterloo, Iowa
Haywood Community College	Bobcats	Clyde, North Carolina
Heartland Community College	Hawks	Normal, Illinois
Heidelberg University	Student Princes	Tiffin, Ohio
Henderson State University	Reddies	Arkadelphia, Arkansas
Hendrix College	Warriors	Conway, Arkansas
Henry Ford College	Hawks	Dearborn, Michigan
Herkimer County Community College	Generals	Herkimer, New York
Hesston College	Larks	Hesston, Kansas

=== HI ===
Institution	Nickname	Location
High Point University	Panthers	High Point, North Carolina
Highland Community College	Cougars	Freeport, Illinois
Highland Community College	Scotties	Highland, Kansas
Highline College	Thunderbirds	Des Moines, Washington
Hilbert College	Hawks	Hamburg, New York
Hill College	Rebels	Hillsboro, Texas
Hillsborough Community College	Hawks	Hillsborough County, Florida
Hillsdale College	Chargers	Hillsdale, Michigan
Hinds Community College	Eagles	Raymond, Mississippi
Hiram College	Terriers	Hiram, Ohio

=== HOB–HOS ===
Institution	Nickname	Location
Hobart and William Smith Colleges	Statesmen (Note: They represent Hobart College.)	Geneva, New York
Hobart and William Smith Colleges	Herons (Note: They represent William Smith College.)	Geneva, New York
Hocking College	Hawks	Nelsonville, Ohio
Hofstra University	Pride	Hempstead, New York
Holmes Community College	Bulldogs	Goodman, Mississippi
College of the Holy Cross	Crusaders	Worcester, Massachusetts
Holy Cross College	Saints	Notre Dame, Indiana
Holy Family University	Tigers	Philadelphia, Pennsylvania
Holyoke Community College	Cougars	Holyoke, Massachusetts
Hood College	Blazers	Frederick, Maryland
Hope College	Flying Dutchmen	Holland, Michigan
Hope International University	Royals	Fullerton, California
Horry-Georgetown Technical College	Gators	Conway, South Carolina
Hostos Community College	Caimans	The Bronx, New York

=== HOU–HOW ===
Institution	Nickname	Location
Houghton University	Highlanders	Houghton, New York
University of Houston	Cougars	Houston, Texas
Houston Christian University	Huskies	Houston, Texas
Houston Community College	Eagles	Houston, Texas
University of Houston–Downtown	Gators	Houston, Texas
University of Houston–Clear Lake	Hawks	Houston, Texas
Howard Community College	Dragons	Columbia, Maryland
Howard College	Hawks	Big Springs, Texas
Howard University	Bison	Washington, D.C.
Howard Payne University	Yellow Jackets	Brownwood, Texas

=== HU ===
Institution	Nickname	Location
Hudson Valley Community College	Vikings	Troy, New York
Hunter College	Hawks	New York City, New York
Huntingdon College	Hawks	Montgomery, Alabama
Huntington University	Foresters	Huntington, Indiana
Husson University	Eagles	Bangor, Maine
Huston–Tillotson University	Rams	Austin, Texas
Hutchinson Community College	Blue Dragons	Hutchinson, Kansas

== I ==
=== ID–IL ===
Institution	Nickname	Location
University of Idaho	Vandals	Moscow, Idaho
Idaho State University	Bengals	Pocatello, Idaho
University of Illinois Urbana-Champaign (Illinois)	Fighting Illini	Champaign–Urbana, Illinois
University of Illinois Chicago (UIC)	Flames	Chicago, Illinois
University of Illinois Springfield	Prairie Stars	Springfield, Illinois
Illinois Central College	Cougars	East Peoria, Illinois
Illinois College	Blue Boys and Lady Blues	Jacksonville, Illinois
Illinois State University	Redbirds	Normal, Illinois
Illinois Institute of Technology	Scarlet Hawks	Chicago, Illinois
Illinois Valley Community College	Eagles	Oglesby, Illinois
Illinois Wesleyan University	Titans	Bloomington, Illinois

=== IM–IN ===
Institution	Nickname	Location
Immaculata University	Mighty Macs	East Whiteland Township, Pennsylvania
University of the Incarnate Word	Cardinals	San Antonio, Texas
Independence Community College	Pirates	Independence, Kansas
Indian Hills Community College	Warriors	Ottumwa and Centerville, Iowa
Indian River State College	Pioneers	Fort Pierce, Florida
Indiana University Bloomington (Indiana)	Hoosiers	Bloomington, Indiana
Indiana University East	Red Wolves	Richmond, Indiana
Indiana University Fort Wayne	Red Foxes	Fort Wayne, Indiana
Indiana University Kokomo	Cougars	Kokomo, Indiana
Indiana University Northwest	RedHawks	Gary, Indiana
Indiana University South Bend	Titans	South Bend, Indiana
Indiana University Southeast	Grenadiers	New Albany, Indiana
Indiana University Columbus (IU Columbus)	Crimson Pride	Columbus, Indiana
Indiana University Indianapolis (IU Indy)	Jaguars	Indianapolis, Indiana
Indiana University of Pennsylvania (IUP)	Crimson Hawks	Indiana, Pennsylvania
Indiana State University	Sycamores	Terre Haute, Indiana
Indiana Institute of Technology	Warriors	Fort Wayne, Indiana
Indiana Wesleyan University	Wildcats	Marion, Indiana
University of Indianapolis	Greyhounds	Indianapolis, Indiana

=== IO–IT ===
Institution	Nickname	Location
Iona University	Gaels	New Rochelle, New York
University of Iowa	Hawkeyes	Iowa City, Iowa
Iowa Central Community College	Tritons	Fort Dodge, Iowa
Iowa Lakes Community College	Lakers	Estherville, Iowa
Iowa State University	Cyclones	Ames, Iowa
Iowa Western Community College	Reivers	Council Bluffs, Iowa
Irvine Valley College	Lasers	Irvine, California
Isothermal Community College	Patriots	Spindale, North Carolina
Itawamba Community College	Indians	Fulton, Mississippi
Ithaca College	Bombers	Ithaca, New York

== J ==
=== JA ===
Institution	Nickname	Location
Jackson College	Jets	Jackson, Michigan
Jackson State Community College	Green Jays	Jackson, Tennessee
Jackson State University	Tigers and Lady Tigers	Jackson, Mississippi
Jacksonville College	Jaguars	Jacksonville, Texas
Jacksonville University	Dolphins	Jacksonville, Florida
Jacksonville State University	Gamecocks	Jacksonville, Alabama
James Madison University	Dukes	Harrisonburg, Virginia
James Sprunt Community College	Spartans	Kenansville, North Carolina
University of Jamestown	Jimmies	Jamestown, North Dakota
Jamestown Community College	Jayhawks	Jamestown, New York
Jarvis Christian University	Bulldogs	Hawkins, Texas

=== JE–JU ===
Institution	Nickname	Location
Jefferson College	Vikings	Hillsboro, Missouri
Thomas Jefferson University (Jefferson)	Rams	Philadelphia, Pennsylvania
Jessup University	Warriors	Rocklin, California
John Brown University	Golden Eagles	Siloam Springs, Arkansas
John Carroll University	Blue Streaks	University Heights, Ohio
John Jay College of Criminal Justice	Bloodhounds	New York City, New York
John Paul the Great Catholic University	Pelicans	Escondido, California
John Wood Community College	Trail Blazers	Quincy, Illinois
Johns Hopkins University	Blue Jays	Baltimore, Maryland
Johnson County Community College	Cavaliers	Overland Park, Kansas
Johnson College	Jaguars	Scranton, Pennsylvania
Johnson University	Royals	Kimberlin Heights, Tennessee
Johnson & Wales University	Wildcats	Various (Note: It has campuses in Charlotte, North Carolina, and Providence, Rhode Island.)
Johnson C. Smith University	Golden Bulls	Charlotte, North Carolina
Johnston Community College	Jaguars	Smithfield, North Carolina
Joliet Junior College	Wolves	Joliet, Illinois
Jones College	Bobcats	Ellisville, Mississippi
Judson University	Eagles	Elgin, Illinois
Juniata College	Eagles	Huntingdon, Pennsylvania
Justice University	Lions	Chandler, Arizona

== K ==
=== KA ===
Institution	Nickname	Location
Kalamazoo College	Hornets	Kalamazoo, Michigan
Kalamazoo Valley Community College	Cougars	Kalamazoo, Michigan
Kankakee Community College	Cavaliers	Kankakee, Illinois
University of Kansas	Jayhawks	Lawrence, Kansas
Kansas Christian College	Falcons	Overland Park, Kansas
University of Missouri–Kansas City (Kansas City)	Roos	Kansas City, Missouri
Kansas City Kansas Community College	Blue Devils	Wyandotte County, Kansas
Kansas State University	Wildcats	Manhattan, Kansas
Kansas Wesleyan University	Coyotes	Salina, Kansas
Kaskaskia College	Blue Devils and Blue Angels	Centralia, Illinois

=== KE ===
Institution	Nickname	Location
Kean Jersey City	Gothic Knights	Jersey City, New Jersey
Kean University	Cougars	Hillsdale, New Jersey
Keene State College	Owls	Keene, New Hampshire
Keiser University	Seahawks	Fort Lauderdale, Florida
Kellogg Community College	Bruins	Battle Creek, Michigan
Kennedy–King College	Statesmen	Chicago, Illinois
Kennesaw State University	Owls	Kennesaw, Georgia
Kent State University	Golden Flashes	Kent, Ohio
University of Kentucky	Wildcats	Lexington, Kentucky
Kentucky Christian University	Knights	Grayson, Kentucky
Kentucky State University	Thorobreds and Thorobrettes	Frankfort, Kentucky
Kentucky Wesleyan College	Panthers	Owensboro, Kentucky
Kenyon College	Owls	Gambier, Ohio
Kettering University	Bulldogs	Flint, Michigan
Keuka College	Wolves	Keuka Park, New York
Keystone College	Giants	La Plume, Pennsylvania

=== KI–KU ===
Institution	Nickname	Location
Kilgore College	Rangers	Kilgore, Texas
King University	Tornado	Bristol, Tennessee
King's College	Monarchs	Wilkes-Barre, Pennsylvania
King's College	Lions	New York City, New York
Kirkwood Community College	Eagles	Cedar Rapids, Iowa
Kirtland Community College	Firebirds	Grayling, Michigan
Kishwaukee College	Kougars	Malta, Illinois
Klamath Community College	Badgers	Klamath Falls, Oregon
Knox College	Prairie Fire	Galesburg, Illinois
Knoxville College	Bulldogs	Knoxville, Tennessee
Kutztown University	Golden Bears	Kutztown, Pennsylvania
Kuyper College	Cougars	Grand Rapids, Michigan

== L ==
=== LA–LAK ===
Institution	Nickname	Location
La Roche University	Red Hawks	McCandless, Pennsylvania
La Salle University	Explorers	Philadelphia, Pennsylvania
La Sierra University	Golden Eagles	Riverside, California
University of La Verne	Leopards	La Verne, California
Labette Community College	Cardinals	Parsons, Kansas
Lackawanna College	Falcons	Scranton, Pennsylvania
Lafayette College	Leopards	Easton, Pennsylvania
LaGrange College	Panthers	LaGrange, Georgia
LaGuardia Community College	Red Hawks	New York City, New York
College of Lake County	Lancers	Lake County, Illinois
Lake Erie College	Storm	Painesville, Ohio
Lake Forest College	Foresters	Lake Forest, Illinois
Lake Land College	Lakers	Mattoon, Illinois
Lake Michigan College	Red Hawks	Benton Charter Township, Michigan
Lake Region State College	Royals	Devils Lake, North Dakota
Lake–Sumter State College	Lakehawks	Clermont and Sumterville, Florida
Lake Superior State University	Lakers	Sault Ste. Marie, Michigan
Lake Tahoe Community College	Coyotes	South Lake Tahoe, California
Lakeland Community College	Lakers	Kirtland, Ohio
Lakeland University	Muskies	Herman, Wisconsin

=== LAM–LAW ===
Institution	Nickname	Location
Lamar Community College	Runnin' Lopes	Lamar, Colorado
Lamar University	Cardinals and Lady Cardinals	Beaumont, Texas
Lamar State College–Port Arthur	Seahawks	Port Arthur, Texas
Lancaster Bible College	Chargers	Lancaster, Pennsylvania
Lander University	Bearcats	Greenwood, South Carolina
Landmark College	Sharks	Putney, Vermont
Lane Community College	Titans	Eugene, Oregon
Lane College	Dragons	Jackson, Tennessee
Laney College	Eagles	Oakland, California
Langston University	Lions	Langston, Oklahoma
Lanier Technical College	Knights	Gainesville, Georgia
Lansing Community College	Stars	Lansing, Michigan
Laramie County Community College	Golden Eagles	Cheyenne, Wyoming
Laredo College	Palominos	Laredo, Texas
Las Positas College	Hawks	Livermore, California
Lasell University	Lasers	Newton, Massachusetts
Lassen Community College	Cougars	Susanville, California
Lawrence University	Vikings	Appleton, Wisconsin
Lawrence Technological University	Blue Devils	Southfield, Michigan
Lawson State Community College	Cougars	Bessemer and Birmingham, Alabama

=== LE ===
Institution	Nickname	Location
Le Moyne College	Dolphins	DeWitt, New York
Lebanon Valley College	Flying Dutchmen	Annville Township, Pennsylvania
Lee College	Navigators	Baytown, Texas
Lee University	Flames	Cleveland, Tennessee
Leech Lake Tribal College	Lakers	Cass Lake, Minnesota
Lees–McRae College	Bobcats	Banner Elk, North Carolina
Lehigh University	Mountain Hawks	Bethlehem, Pennsylvania
Lehigh Carbon Community College	Cougars	Schnecksville, Pennsylvania
Lehman College	Lightning	New York City, New York
Lemoore College	Golden Eagles	Lemoore, California
LeMoyne–Owen College	Magicians	Memphis, Tennessee
Lenoir Community College	Lancers	Kinston, North Carolina
Lenoir–Rhyne University	Bears	Hickory, North Carolina
Lesley University	Lynx	Cambridge, Massachusetts
LeTourneau University	Yellow Jackets	Longview, Texas
Lewis and Clark Community College	Trailblazers	Godfrey, Illinois
Lewis & Clark College	Pioneers	Portland, Oregon
Lewis–Clark State College	Warriors and Lady Warriors	Lewiston, Idaho

=== LI ===
Institution	Nickname	Location
Liberty University	Flames and Lady Flames	Lynchburg, Virginia
Life University	Running Eagles	Marietta, Georgia
Life Pacific University	Warriors	San Dimas, California
Lincoln Land Community College	Loggers	Springfield, Illinois
Lincoln University	Oaklanders	Oakland, California
Lincoln University	Blue Tigers	Jefferson City, Missouri
Lincoln University	Lions	Oxford, Pennsylvania
Lincoln Memorial University	Railsplitters	Harrogate, Tennessee
Lincoln Trail College	Statesmen	Robinson, Illinois
Lindenwood University	Lions	St. Charles, Missouri
Lindsey Wilson University	Blue Raiders	Columbia, Kentucky
Linfield University	Wildcats	McMinnville, Oregon
Linn–Benton Community College	Roadrunners	Albany, Oregon
Lipscomb University	Bisons	Nashville, Tennessee
Little Priest Tribal College	Warriors	Winnebago, Nebraska
Livingstone College	Blue Bears	Salisbury, North Carolina

=== LOC–LOR ===
Institution	Nickname	Location
John A. Logan College (Logan College)	Volunteers	Carterville, Illinois
Logan University	Leopards	Chesterfield, Missouri
Loma Linda University	Lions	Loma Linda, California
Lone Star College–CyFair	Falcons	Cypress, Texas
Lone Star College–Montgomery	Mavericks	The Woodlands, Texas
Lone Star College–North Harris	Hurricanes	Harris County, Texas
Lone Star College–Tomball	Timberwolves	Tomball, Texas
Long Beach City College	Vikings	Long Beach, California
Long Island University (LIU)	Sharks	Brooklyn and Brookville, New York
Longwood University	Lancers	Farmville, Virginia
Lorain County Community College	Commodores	Elyria, Ohio
Loras College	Duhawks	Dubuque, Iowa

=== LOS ===
Institution	Nickname	Location
Los Angeles City College	Cubs	East Hollywood, California
Los Angeles Harbor College	Seahawks	Wilmington, California
Los Angeles Mission College	Eagles	Los Angeles, California
Los Angeles Pierce College	Brahmas	Woodland Hills, California
Los Angeles Southwest College	Cougars	West Athens, California
Los Angeles Trade–Technical College	Beavers	Los Angeles, California
Los Angeles Valley College	Monarchs	Valley Glen, California
Los Medanos College	Mustangs	Pittsburg, California

=== LOU ===
Institution	Nickname	Location
Louisburg College	Hurricanes	Louisburg, North Carolina
University of Louisiana at Lafayette (Louisiana) (Note: The athletics are mainly branded simply as Louisiana, but they are also known as Louisiana–Lafayette, UL Lafayette and ULL.)	Ragin' Cajuns	Lafayette, Louisiana
University of Louisiana at Monroe (Note: The athletics are mainly branded as Louisiana–Monroe, but they are also known as UL Monroe and ULM.)	Warhawks	Monroe, Louisiana
Louisiana Christian University	Wildcats and Lady Wildcats	Pineville, Louisiana
Louisiana Delta Community College	Knights	Monroe, Louisiana
Louisiana State University (LSU)	Tigers and Lady Tigers (Note: They are also known as Fighting Tigers.)	Baton Rouge, Louisiana
Louisiana State University of Alexandria (LSU–Alexandria)	Generals	Alexandria, Louisiana
Louisiana State University at Eunice (LSU–Eunice)	Bengals	Eunice, Louisiana
Louisiana State University New Orleans (LSU New Orleans)	Privateers	New Orleans, Louisiana
Louisiana State University Shreveport (LSU–Shreveport)	Pilots	Shreveport, Louisiana
Louisiana Tech University	Bulldogs and Lady Techsters	Ruston, Louisiana
University of Louisville	Cardinals	Louisville, Kentucky
Louisville Bible College	Trailblazers	Louisville, Kentucky
Lourdes University	Gray Wolves	Sylvania, Ohio

=== LOW–LY ===
Institution	Nickname	Location
Lower Columbia College	Red Devils	Longview, Washington
Loyola University Chicago	Ramblers	Chicago, Illinois
Loyola University Maryland	Greyhounds	Baltimore, Maryland
Loyola Marymount University	Lions	Los Angeles, California
Loyola University New Orleans	Wolf Pack	New Orleans, Louisiana
Lubbock Christian University	Chaparrals and Lady Chaps	Lubbock, Texas
Luna Community College	Rough Riders	Las Vegas, New Mexico
Lurleen B. Wallace Community College	Saints	Various (Note: It has campuses in Andalusia; Greenville; Opp and Luverne, Alabama.)
Luther College	Norse	Decorah, Iowa
Luzerne County Community College	Trailblazers	Nanticoke, Pennsylvania
Lycoming College	Warriors	Williamsport, Pennsylvania
University of Lynchburg	Hornets	Lynchburg, Virginia
Lynn University	Fighting Knights	Boca Raton, Florida
Lyon College	Scots	Batesville, Arkansas

== M ==
=== MAC–MAL ===
Institution	Nickname	Location
Macalester College	Scots	Saint Paul, Minnesota
William E. Macaulay Honors College (Macaulay)	Mountain Lions	New York City, New York
Macomb Community College	Monarchs	Warren, Michigan
Madison Area Technical College	Wolfpack	Madison, Wisconsin
Madonna University	Crusaders	Livonia, Michigan
Maharishi International University	Pioneers	Fairfield, Iowa
University of Maine	Black Bears	Orono, Maine
University of Maine at Augusta	Moose	Augusta, Maine
University of Maine at Farmington	Beavers	Farmington, Maine
University of Maine at Fort Kent	Bengals	Fort Kent, Maine
University of Maine at Machias	Clippers	Machias, Maine
University of Maine at Presque Isle	Owls	Presque Isle, Maine
Maine Maritime Academy	Mariners	Castine, Maine
College of the Mainland	Fighting Ducks	Texas City, Texas
Malcolm X College	Hawks	Chicago, Illinois
Malone University	Pioneers	Canton, Ohio

=== MAN ===
Institution	Nickname	Location
Manchester Community College	Cougars	Manchester, Connecticut
Manchester University	Spartans	North Manchester, Indiana
Borough of Manhattan Community College (BMCC)	Panthers	New York City, New York
Manhattan University	Jaspers	New York City, New York
Manhattan Area Technical College	Bison	Manhattan, Kansas
Manhattan Christian College	Thunder	Manhattan, Kansas
Manhattanville University	Valiants	Purchase, New York
Manor College	Blue Jays	Abington Township, Pennsylvania

=== MAR ===
Institution	Nickname	Location
Maranatha Baptist University	Sabercats	Watertown, Wisconsin
Marian University	Knights	Indianapolis, Indiana
Marian University	Sabres	Fond du Lac, Wisconsin
Marietta College	Pioneers	Marietta, Ohio
College of Marin	Mariners	Kentfield, California
Marion Military Institute (MMI)	Tigers	Marion, Alabama
Marist University	Red Foxes	Poughkeepsie, New York
Marquette University	Golden Eagles	Milwaukee, Wisconsin
Mars Hill University	Lions	Mars Hill, North Carolina
Marshall University	Thundering Herd	Huntington, West Virginia
Marshalltown Community College	Tigers	Marshalltown, Iowa
Martin Luther College	Knights	New Ulm, Minnesota
University of Mary	Marauders	Bismarck, North Dakota
Mary Baldwin University	Fighting Squirrels	Staunton, Virginia
University of Mary Hardin–Baylor	Crusaders	Belton, Texas
University of Mary Washington	Eagles	Fredericksburg, Virginia
University of Maryland, Baltimore County (UMBC)	Retrievers	Catonsville, Maryland
University of Maryland, College Park	Terrapins	College Park, Maryland
University of Maryland Eastern Shore (UMES)	Hawks	Princess Anne, Maryland
Marymount University	Saints	Arlington County, Virginia
Marymount Manhattan College	Griffins	New York City, New York
Maryville College	Scots	Maryville, Tennessee
Maryville University	Saints	Town and Country, Missouri
Marywood University	Pacers	Scranton, Pennsylvania

=== MAS–MAY ===
Institution	Nickname	Location
Massachusetts College of Art and Design (MassArt)	Mastodons	Boston, Massachusetts
University of Massachusetts Amherst (UMass)	Minutemen and Minutewomen	Amherst, Massachusetts
University of Massachusetts Boston (UMass Boston)	Beacons	Boston, Massachusetts
University of Massachusetts Dartmouth (UMass Dartmouth)	Corsairs	Dartmouth, Massachusetts
University of Massachusetts Lowell (UMass Lowell)	River Hawks	Lowell, Massachusetts
Massachusetts Bay Community College (MassBay)	Buccaneers	Various (Note: It has campuses in Wellesley; Framingham and Ashland, Massachusetts.)
Massachusetts College of Liberal Arts (MCLA)	Trailblazers	North Adams, Massachusetts
Massachusetts Maritime Academy	Buccaneers	Buzzards Bay, Massachusetts
Massasoit Community College	Warriors	Brockton, Massachusetts
The Master's University	Mustangs	Santa Clarita, California
Mayland Community College	Mountain Lions	Spruce Pine, North Carolina
Mayville State University	Comets	Mayville, North Dakota

=== MC ===
Institution	Nickname	Location
McDaniel College	Green Terror	Westminster, Maryland
McHenry County College	Fighting Scots	Crystal Lake, Illinois
McKendree University	Bearcats	Lebanon, Illinois
McLennan Community College	Highlanders and Highlassies	Waco, Texas
McMurry University	War Hawks	Abilene, Texas
McNeese State University	Cowboys and Cowgirls	Lake Charles, Louisiana
McPherson College	Bulldogs	McPherson, Kansas

=== ME ===
Institution	Nickname	Location
Medgar Evers College	Cougars	Brooklyn, New York
University of Memphis	Tigers	Memphis, Tennessee
Mendocino College	Eagles	Ukiah, California
Menlo College	Oaks	Atherton, California
Merced College	Blue Devils	Merced, California
Mercer University	Bears	Macon, Georgia
Mercer County Community College	Vikings	Mercer County, New Jersey
United States Merchant Marine Academy (USMMA)	Mariners	Kings Point, New York
Mercy University	Mavericks	Dobbs Ferry, New York
Mercyhurst University	Lakers	Erie, Pennsylvania
Meredith College	Avenging Angels	Raleigh, North Carolina
Meridian Community College	Eagles	Meridian, Mississippi
Merrimack College	Warriors	North Andover, Massachusetts
Merritt College	Panthers	Oakland, California
Mesa Community College	Thunderbirds	Mesa, Arizona
Minnesota North College – Mesabi Range Virginia (Mesabi Range)	Norse	Virginia, Minnesota
Mesalands Community College	Stampede	Tucumcari, New Mexico
Messiah University	Falcons	Mechanicsburg, Pennsylvania
Methodist University	Monarchs	Fayetteville, North Carolina
Metropolitan Community College	Wolves	Kansas City, Missouri
Metropolitan State University	Rodents	Minneapolis–Saint Paul, Minnesota
Metropolitan State University of Denver (MSU Denver)	Roadrunners	Denver, Colorado

=== MIA–MID ===
Institution	Nickname	Location
University of Miami	Hurricanes	Coral Gables, Florida
Miami Dade College	Sharks	Miami, Florida
Miami University	RedHawks	Oxford, Ohio
Miami University Hamilton	Harriers	Hamilton, Ohio
Miami University Middletown	Thunderhawks	Middletown, Ohio
University of Michigan	Wolverines	Ann Arbor, Michigan
Michigan State University	Spartans	East Lansing, Michigan
Michigan Technological University	Huskies	Houghton, Michigan
Mid Michigan College	Lakers	Harrison and Mount Pleasant, Michigan
Mid-America Christian University	Evangels	Oklahoma City, Oklahoma
MidAmerica Nazarene University	Pioneers	Olathe, Kansas
Mid-Atlantic Christian University	Mustangs	Elizabeth City, North Carolina
Middle Georgia State University	Knights	Macon, Georgia
Middle Tennessee State University	Blue Raiders	Murfreesboro, Tennessee
Middlebury College	Panthers	Middlebury, Vermont
Middlesex College	Colts	Edison, New Jersey
Middlesex Community College	Owls	Bedford and Lowell, Massachusetts
Midland College	Chaparrals	Midland, Texas
Midland University	Warriors	Fremont, Nebraska
Midlands Technical College	Mavericks	Columbia, South Carolina
Midway University	Eagles	Midway, Kentucky
Midwestern State University	Mustangs	Wichita Falls, Texas

=== MIL–MIN ===
Institution	Nickname	Location
Miles College	Golden Bears	Fairfield, Alabama
Miles Community College	Pioneers	Miles City, Montana
Milligan University	Buffaloes	Milligan College, Tennessee
Millikin University	Big Blue	Decatur, Illinois
Millsaps College	Majors	Jackson, Mississippi
Millersville University	Marauders	Millersville, Pennsylvania
Milwaukee Area Technical College	Stormers	Milwaukee, Wisconsin
Milwaukee School of Engineering (MSOE)	Raiders	Milwaukee, Wisconsin
Mineral Area College	Cardinals	Park Hills, Missouri
University of Minnesota	Golden Gophers	Minneapolis–Saint Paul, Minnesota
University of Minnesota Crookston	Golden Eagles	Crookston, Minnesota
University of Minnesota Duluth	Bulldogs	Duluth, Minnesota
University of Minnesota Morris	Cougars	Morris, Minnesota
Minnesota North College – Hibbing (Hibbing)	Cardinals	Hibbing, Minnesota
Minnesota North College – Itasca (Itasca)	Vikings	Grand Rapids, Minnesota
Minnesota North College – Mesabi Range Virginia (Mesabi Range)	Norse	Virginia, Minnesota
Minnesota North College – Rainy River (Rainy River)	Voyageurs	International Falls, Minnesota
Minnesota North College – Vermilion (Vermilion)	Ironhawks (Note: Previously known as Ironmen.)	Ely, Minnesota
Minnesota State University, Mankato (Minnesota State)	Mavericks	Mankato, Minnesota
Minnesota State University Moorhead	Dragons	Moorhead, Minnesota
Minnesota State Community and Technical College	Spartans	Various (Note: The main campus is located in Fergus Falls, but it also has campuses at Moorhead; Detroit Lakes and Wadena, Minnesota.)
Minnesota West Community and Technical College	Bluejays	Various (Note: It has campuses in Canby; Granite Falls; Jackson; Pipestone and Worthington, Minnesota.)
Minot State University	Beavers	Minot, North Dakota

=== MIR–MIT ===
Institution	Nickname	Location
MiraCosta College	Spartans	Oceanside, California
San Diego Miramar College (Miramar)	Jets	San Diego, California
Misericordia University	Cougars	Dallas, Pennsylvania
Mission College	Saints	Santa Clara, California
Mission University	Patriots	Springfield, Missouri
University of Mississippi (Ole Miss)	Rebels	Oxford, Mississippi
Mississippi Christian University	Choctaws	Clinton, Mississippi
Mississippi Delta Community College	Trojans	Moorhead, Mississippi
Mississippi Gulf Coast Community College	Bulldogs	Perkinston, Mississippi
Mississippi State University	Bulldogs	Starkville, Mississippi
Mississippi University for Women (MUW)	Owls	Columbus, Mississippi
Mississippi Valley State University	Delta Devils and Devilettes	Itta Bena, Mississippi
University of Missouri	Tigers	Columbia, Missouri
Missouri Baptist University	Spartans	Creve Coeur, Missouri
University of Missouri–St. Louis (UMSL)	Tritons	St. Louis, Missouri
Missouri University of Science and Technology (Missouri S&T)	Miners	Rolla, Missouri
Missouri Southern State University	Lions	Joplin, Missouri
Missouri State University	Bears and Lady Bears	Springfield, Missouri
Missouri State University–West Plains	Grizzlies	West Plains, Missouri
Missouri Valley University	Vikings	Marshall, Missouri
Missouri Western State University	Griffons	St. Joseph, Missouri
Massachusetts Institute of Technology (MIT)	Engineers	Cambridge, Massachusetts
Mitchell College	Mariners	New London, Connecticut
Mitchell Community College	Mavericks	Statesville, North Carolina
Mitchell Technical College	Mavericks	Mitchell, South Dakota

=== MOB–MON ===
Institution	Nickname	Location
University of Mobile	Rams	Prichard, Alabama
Moberly Area Community College	Greyhounds	Moberly, Missouri
Modesto Junior College	Pirates	Modesto, California
Mohawk Valley Community College	Hawks	Utica, New York
Molloy University	Lions	Rockville Centre, New York
Monmouth College	Fighting Scots	Monmouth, Illinois
Monmouth University	Hawks	West Long Branch, New Jersey
Monroe Community College	Tribunes	Brighton, New York
Monroe County Community College	Huskies	Monroe County, Michigan
Monroe University	Mustangs (Note: The athletics are branded as New Rochelle Mustangs.)	New Rochelle, New York
Monroe University	Express (Note: The athletics are branded as Bronx Express.)	The Bronx, New York
University of Montana	Grizzlies and Lady Griz	Missoula, Montana
University of Montana Western	Bulldogs	Dillon, Montana
Montana State University	Bobcats	Bozeman, Montana
Montana State University Billings	Yellowjackets	Billings, Montana
Montana State University–Northern	Lights and Skylights	Havre, Montana
Montana Technological University	Orediggers	Butte, Montana
Montcalm Community College	Centurions	Sidney Township, Michigan
Montclair State University	Red Hawks	Montclair, New Jersey
University of Montevallo	Falcons	Montevallo, Alabama
Montgomery College	Raptors	Montgomery County, Maryland
Montgomery County Community College	Mustangs	Blue Bell, Pennsylvania
Montreat College	Cavaliers	Montreat, North Carolina

=== MOO–MOT ===
Institution	Nickname	Location
Moody Bible Institute	Archers	Various (Note: It has campuses at Chicago, Illinois; Spokane, Washington and Plymouth, Michigan.)
Moorpark College	Raiders	Moorpark, California
Moraine Park Technical College	Wolves	Fond du Lac, Wisconsin
Moraine Valley Community College	Cyclones	Palos Hills, Illinois
Moravian University	Greyhounds	Bethlehem, Pennsylvania
Morehead State University	Eagles	Morehead, Kentucky
Morehouse College	Maroon Tigers	Atlanta, Georgia
Moreno Valley College	Lions	Moreno Valley, California
Morgan Community College	Roadrunners	Fort Morgan, Colorado
Morgan State University	Bears and Lady Bears	Baltimore, Maryland
Morningside University	Mustangs	Sioux City, Iowa
Morris College	Hornets	Sumter, South Carolina
Morris Brown College	Wolverines	Atlanta, Georgia
State University of New York at Morrisville (Morrisville)	Mustangs	Morrisville, New York
Morton College	Panthers	Cicero, Illinois
Motlow State Community College	Bucks and Lady Bucks	Various (Note: It has campuses in Lynchburg; McMinnville; Fayetteville and Smyrna, Tennessee.)
Mott Community College	Bears	Flint, Michigan

=== MOU ===
Institution	Nickname	Location
Mount Aloysius College	Mounties	Cresson, Pennsylvania
Mt. Hood Community College	Saints	Gresham, Oregon
Mount Holyoke College	Lyons	South Hadley, Massachusetts
Mount Mary University	Blue Angels	Milwaukee, Wisconsin
Mount Marty University	Lancers	Yankton, South Dakota
Mount Mercy University	Mustangs	Cedar Rapids, Iowa
University of Mount Olive	Trojans	Mount Olive, North Carolina
Mount St. Joseph University	Lions	Delhi Township, Ohio
Mount Saint Mary College	Knights	Newburgh, New York
Mount St. Mary's University	Mountaineers	Emmitsburg, Maryland
Mount Saint Mary's University, Los Angeles	Athenians	Los Angeles, California
University of Mount Saint Vincent	Dolphins	New York City, New York
Mt. San Antonio College	Mounties	Walnut, California
Mt. San Jacinto College	Eagles	Various (Note: It has campuses in San Jacinto; Menifee; Banning and Temecula, California)
University of Mount Union	Purple Raiders	Alliance, Ohio
Mount Vernon Nazarene University	Cougars	Mount Vernon, Ohio
Mount Wachusett Community College	Mountain Lions	Gardner, Massachusetts
Mountain Gateway Community College	Roadrunners	Buena Vista, Virginia
Dallas College Mountain View (Mountain View)	Lions	Dallas, Texas

=== MU ===
Institution	Nickname	Location
Muhlenberg College	Mules	Allentown, Pennsylvania
Murray State College	Aggies	Tishomingo, Oklahoma
Murray State University	Racers	Murray, Kentucky
Muskegon Community College	Jayhawks	Muskegon, Michigan
Muskingum University	Fighting Muskies	New Concord, Ohio

== N ==
=== NA–NEV ===
Institution	Nickname	Location
Napa Valley College	Storm	Napa, California
Nash Community College	Nighthawks	Rocky Mount, North Carolina
Nashua Community College	Jaguars	Nashua, New Hampshire
Nassau Community College	Lions	Uniondale, New York
National Park College	Nighthawks	Hot Springs, Arkansas
Navajo Technical University	Skyhawks	Crownpoint, New Mexico
Navarro College	Bulldogs	Corsicana, Texas
United States Naval Academy (Navy)	Midshipmen	Annapolis, Maryland
Nazareth University	Golden Flyers	Pittsford, New York
University of Nebraska–Lincoln (Nebraska)	Cornhuskers	Lincoln, Nebraska
University of Nebraska at Kearney	Lopers	Kearney, Nebraska
University of Nebraska Omaha (Omaha) (Note: The athletics are mainly branded as Omaha, but they are also known as Nebraska–Omaha and UNO.)	Mavericks	Omaha, Nebraska
Nebraska College of Technical Agriculture	Aggies	Curtis, Nebraska
Nebraska Indian Community College	Buffaloes	Various (Note: It has campuses in Macy; Santee and South Sioux City, Nebraska.)
Nebraska Wesleyan University	Prairie Wolves	Lincoln, Nebraska
Nelson University	Lions	Waxahachie, Texas
Neosho County Community College	Panthers	Chanute, Kansas
Neumann University	Knights	Aston Township, Pennsylvania
University of Nevada, Reno (Nevada)	Wolf Pack	Reno, Nevada
University of Nevada, Las Vegas (UNLV)	Rebels (Note: Men's basketball team uses Runnin' Rebels, women's basketball team uses Lady Rebels, and baseball team uses Hustlin' Rebels.)	Paradise, Nevada
Nevada State University	Scorpions	Henderson, Nevada

=== NEW ===
Institution	Nickname	Location
New College of Florida	Mighty Banyans	Sarasota, Florida
University of New England	Nor'easters	Biddeford, Maine
New England College	Pilgrims	Henniker, New Hampshire
New England Institute of Technology	Tigers	East Greenwich, Rhode Island
University of New Hampshire	Wildcats	Durham, New Hampshire
University of New Haven	Chargers	West Haven, Connecticut
New Hope Christian College	Deacons	Eugene, Oregon
University of New Mexico	Lobos	Albuquerque, New Mexico
New Mexico Highlands University	Cowboys and Cowgirls	Las Vegas, New Mexico
New Mexico Junior College	Thunderbirds	Hobbs, New Mexico
New Mexico Institute of Mining and Technology	Miners	Socorro, New Mexico
New Mexico Military Institute (NMMI)	Broncos	Roswell, New Mexico
New Mexico State University	Aggies	Las Cruces, New Mexico
The New School	Narwhals	New York City, New York
Newberry College	Wolves	Newberry, South Carolina
Newman University	Jets	Wichita, Kansas

=== NH–NORM ===
Institution	Nickname	Location
NHTI – Concord's Community College (NHTI)	Lynx	Concord, New Hampshire
Niagara University	Purple Eagles	Lewiston, New York
Nichols College	Bison	Dudley, Massachusetts
Nicholls State University (Note: The athletics are mainly branded simply as Nicholls, but it may also be known as Nicholls State.)	Colonels	Thibodaux, Louisiana
New Jersey Institute of Technology (NJIT)	Highlanders	Newark, New Jersey
Nobel University	Knights	Los Angeles, California
Norco College	Mustangs	Norco, California
Norfolk State University	Spartans	Norfolk, Virginia
Normandale Community College	Lions	Bloomington, Minnesota

=== NORTH A–NORTH C ===
Institution	Nickname	Location
University of North Alabama	Lions	Florence, Alabama
North American University	Stallions	Stafford, Texas
North Arkansas College	Pioneers and Lady Pioneers	Harrison, Arkansas
University of North Carolina at Asheville (UNC Asheville)	Bulldogs	Asheville, North Carolina
University of North Carolina at Chapel Hill (North Carolina)	Tar Heels	Chapel Hill, North Carolina
University of North Carolina at Charlotte (Charlotte)	49ers	Charlotte, North Carolina
University of North Carolina at Greensboro (UNC Greensboro)	Spartans	Greensboro, North Carolina
University of North Carolina at Pembroke (UNC Pembroke)	Braves	Pembroke, North Carolina
University of North Carolina Wilmington (UNC Wilmington)	Seahawks	Wilmington, North Carolina
North Carolina A&T State University	Aggies	Greensboro, North Carolina
North Carolina Central University	Eagles	Durham, North Carolina
University of North Carolina School of the Arts	Fighting Pickles	Winston-Salem, North Carolina
North Carolina State University (NC State)	Wolfpack	Raleigh, North Carolina
North Carolina Wesleyan University	Battling Bishops	Rocky Mount, North Carolina
North Central College	Cardinals	Naperville, Illinois
North Central Michigan College	Timberwolves	Petoskey, Michigan
North Central Missouri College	Pirates	Trenton, Missouri
North Central Texas College	Lions	Gainesville, Texas
North Central University	Rams	Minneapolis, Minnesota
North Country Community College	Saints	Saranac Lake, New York

=== NORTH D–NORTH ===
Institution	Nickname	Location
University of North Dakota	Fighting Hawks	Grand Forks, North Dakota
North Dakota State University	Bison	Fargo, North Dakota
North Dakota State College of Science	Wildcats	Wahpeton, North Dakota
North Florida College	Sentinels	Madison, Florida
University of North Florida	Ospreys	Jacksonville, Florida
University of North Georgia	Nighthawks	Dahlonega, Georgia
North Georgia Technical College	Wolves	Clarkesville, Georgia
North Greenville University	Trailblazers	Tigerville, South Carolina
North Hennepin Community College	Norsemen	Brooklyn Park, Minnesota
North Idaho College	Cardinals	Coeur d'Alene, Idaho
North Iowa Area Community College	Trojans	Mason City, Iowa
Dallas College North Lake (North Lake)	Blazers	Irving, Texas
North Park University	Vikings	Chicago, Illinois
North Seattle College	Tree Frogs	Seattle, Washington
University of North Texas	Mean Green	Denton, Texas
University of North Texas at Dallas (UNT Dallas)	Trailblazers	Dallas, Texas

=== NORTHA–NORTHEA ===
Institution	Nickname	Location
Northampton Community College	Spartans	Bethlehem, Pennsylvania
Northcentral Technical College	Timberwolves	Wausau, Wisconsin
Northeast Community College	Hawks	Norfolk, Nebraska
Northeast Alabama Community College	Mustangs	Rainsville, Alabama
Northeast Mississippi Community College	Tigers	Booneville, Mississippi
Northeast State Community College	Bears	Blountville, Tennessee
Northeast Texas Community College	Eagles	Mount Pleasant, Texas
Northeast Wisconsin Technical College	Eagles	Green Bay, Wisconsin
Northeastern University	Huskies	Boston, Massachusetts
Northeastern Illinois University	Golden Eagles	Chicago, Illinois
Northeastern Junior College	Plainsmen	Sterling, Colorado
Northeastern Oklahoma A&M College	Golden Norsemen and Lady Norse	Miami, Oklahoma
Northeastern State University	RiverHawks	Tahlequah, Oklahoma
Northeastern Technical College	Trailblazers	Cheraw, South Carolina

=== NORTHERN–NORTHLAND ===
Institution	Nickname	Location
Northern Arizona University	Lumberjacks	Flagstaff, Arizona
University of Northern Colorado	Bears	Greeley, Colorado
Northern Essex Community College	Knights	Essex County, Massachusetts
Northern Illinois University	Huskies	DeKalb, Illinois
University of Northern Iowa	Panthers	Cedar Falls, Iowa
Northern Kentucky University	Norse	Highland Heights, Kentucky
Northern Maine Community College	Falcons	Presque Isle, Maine
Northern Michigan University	Wildcats	Marquette, Michigan
Northern New Mexico College	Eagles	Española, New Mexico
Northern State University	Wolves	Aberdeen, South Dakota
Northern Virginia Community College	Nighthawks	Annandale, Virginia
Northland Community & Technical College	Pioneers	Thief River Falls and East Grand Forks, Minnesota

=== NORTHWEST ===
Institution	Nickname	Location
Northwest University	Eagles	Kirkland, Washington
Northwest College	Trappers	Powell, Wyoming
Northwest Florida State College	Raiders	Niceville, Florida
Northwest Indian College	Eagles	Bellingham, Washington
Northwest Mississippi Community College	Rangers	Senatobia, Mississippi
Northwest Missouri State University	Bearcats	Maryville, Missouri
Northwest Nazarene University	Nighthawks	Nampa, Idaho
Northwest Vista College	Wildcats	San Antonio, Texas
Northwest–Shoals Community College	Patriots (Note: It may also be known as Vikings.)	Muscle Shoals and Phil Campbell, Alabama
Northwestern College	Red Raiders	Orange City, Iowa
Northwestern University	Wildcats	Evanston, Illinois
Northwestern Connecticut Community College	Moose	Winsted, Connecticut
University of Northwestern – St. Paul (Note: The athletics are mainly branded simply as Northwestern, but they may also be known as Northwestern–St. Paul or Northwestern (MN).)	Eagles	Roseville, Minnesota
Northwestern Michigan College	Hawk Owls	Traverse City, Michigan
University of Northwestern Ohio (Note: It may also be known as UNWO.)	Racers	Lima, Ohio
Northwestern Oklahoma State University (Note: It may also be known as NWOSU.)	Rangers	Alva, Oklahoma
Northwestern State University	Demons and Lady Demons	Natchitoches, Louisiana

=== NORTHWO–NY ===
Institution	Nickname	Location
Northwood University	Timberwolves	Midland, Michigan
Norwich University	Cadets	Northfield, Vermont
University of Notre Dame	Fighting Irish	Notre Dame, Indiana
Notre Dame of Maryland University (Note: It may be known as Notre Dame Maryland or simply Notre Dame.)	Gators	Baltimore, Maryland
Nova Southeastern University	Sharks	Fort Lauderdale and Davie, Florida
Nueta Hidatsa Sahnish College	Storm	New Town, North Dakota
Nunez Community College	Pelicans	Chalmette, Louisiana
New York Institute of Technology (NYIT)	Bears	Old Westbury, New York
New York University (NYU)	Violets	New York City, New York

== O ==
=== OA–OG ===
Institution	Nickname	Location
Oak Hills Christian College	Wolfpack	Bemidji, Minnesota
Oakland Community College	Owls	Oakland County, Michigan
Oakland University	Golden Grizzlies	Rochester, Michigan
Oakland City University	Mighty Oaks	Oakland City, Indiana
Oakton College	Raiders	Des Plaines and Skokie, Illinois
Oakwood University	Ambassadors	Huntsville, Alabama
Oberlin College	Yeomen and Yeowomen	Oberlin, Ohio
Ocean County College	Vikings	Toms River, New Jersey
Occidental College	Tigers	Los Angeles, California
Oconee Fall Line Technical College	Owls	Sandersville, Georgia
Odessa College	Wranglers	Odessa, Texas
Oglala Lakota College	Bravehearts	Kyle, South Dakota
Oglethorpe University	Stormy Petrels	Brookhaven, Georgia

=== OH–OK ===
Institution	Nickname	Location
Ohio University	Bobcats	Athens, Ohio
Ohio University – Zanesville	Tracers	Zanesville, Ohio
Ohio Christian University	Trailblazers	Circleville, Ohio
Ohio Dominican University	Panthers	Columbus, Ohio
Ohio Northern University	Polar Bears	Ada, Ohio
Ohio State University	Buckeyes	Columbus, Ohio
Ohio State University at Lima	Barons	Lima, Ohio
Ohio State University at Mansfield	Mavericks	Mansfield, Ohio
Ohio State University at Marion	Scarlet Wave	Marion, Ohio
Ohio State University at Newark	Titans	Newark, Ohio
Ohio Wesleyan University	Battling Bishops	Delaware, Ohio
Ohlone College	Renegades	Fremont, California
University of Oklahoma	Sooners	Norman, Oklahoma
Oklahoma Baptist University	Bison	Shawnee, Oklahoma
Oklahoma Christian University	Eagles and Lady Eagles	Oklahoma City, Oklahoma
Oklahoma City University	Stars	Oklahoma City, Oklahoma
Oklahoma Panhandle State University	Aggies	Goodwell, Oklahoma
University of Science and Arts of Oklahoma (USAO)	Drovers	Chickasha, Oklahoma
Oklahoma State University	Cowboys and Cowgirls	Stillwater, Oklahoma
Oklahoma Wesleyan University	Eagles	Bartlesville, Oklahoma

=== OL–OR ===
Institution	Nickname	Location
Old Dominion University	Monarchs	Norfolk, Virginia
Olin College	Phoenix	Needham, Massachusetts
Olive–Harvey College	Purple Panthers	Chicago, Illinois
University of Olivet	Comets	Olivet, Michigan
Olivet Nazarene University	Tigers	Bourbonnais, Illinois
Olney Central College	Blue Knights	Olney, Illinois
Olympic College	Rangers	Bremerton, Washington
Onondaga Community College	Lazers	Syracuse, New York
Oral Roberts University	Golden Eagles	Tulsa, Oklahoma
Orange Coast College	Pirates	Costa Mesa, California
Orangeburg–Calhoun Technical College	Owls	Orangeburg, South Carolina
University of Oregon	Ducks	Eugene, Oregon
Oregon Coast Community College	Sharks	Newport, Oregon
Oregon State University	Beavers	Corvallis, Oregon
Oregon Institute of Technology	Owls and Lady Owls (Note: It may also be known as Hustlin' Owls.)	Klamath Falls, Oregon

=== OT–OZ ===
Institution	Nickname	Location
Otero College	Rattlers	La Junta, Colorado
Otis College of Art and Design	Owls	Westchester, California
Ottawa University	Braves	Ottawa, Kansas
Ottawa University	Spirit	Surprise, Arizona
Otterbein University	Cardinals	Westerville, Ohio
Ouachita Baptist University	Tigers	Arkadelphia, Arkansas
College of Our Lady of the Elms (Elms)	Blazers	Chicopee, Massachusetts
Our Lady of the Lake University	Saints	San Antonio, Texas
Oxford College of Emory University	Eagles	Oxford, Georgia
Oxnard College	Condors	Oxnard, California
Owens Community College	Express	Toledo, Ohio
Ozark Christian College	Ambassadors	Joplin, Missouri
College of the Ozarks	Bobcats	Point Lookout, Missouri
University of the Ozarks	Eagles	Clarksville, Arkansas
Ozarks Technical Community College	Eagles	Springfield, Missouri

== P ==
=== PA ===
Institution	Nickname	Location
Pace University	Setters	New York City, New York
University of the Pacific	Tigers	Stockton, California
Pacific University	Boxers	Forest Grove, Oregon
Pacific Lutheran University	Lutes	Parkland, Washington
Pacific Union College	Pioneers	Angwin, California
Paine College	Lions	Augusta, Georgia
Palm Beach Atlantic University	Sailfish	West Palm Beach, Florida
Palm Beach State College	Panthers	Lake Worth Beach, Florida
Palo Alto College	Palominos	San Antonio, Texas
Palo Verde College	Pirates	Blythe, California
Palomar College	Comets	San Marcos, California
Panola College	Ponies	Carthage, Texas
Paradise Valley Community College	Pumas	Phoenix, Arizona
Paris Junior College	Dragons	Paris, Texas
Park University	Pirates (Note: The athletics are mainly branded simply as Park, but they may also be known as Park–Missouri.)	Parkville, Missouri
Park University	Buccaneers (Note: They are branded as Park–Gilbert.)	Gilbert, Arizona
Parkland College	Cobras	Champaign, Illinois
Pasadena City College	Lancers	Pasadena, California
Pasco–Hernando State College	Bobcats	New Port Richey, Florida
Passaic County Community College	Panthers	Passaic County, New Jersey
Patrick & Henry Community College	Patriots	Martinsville, Virginia
Patrick Henry College	Sentinels	Purcellville, Virginia
Paul D. Camp Community College	Hurricanes	Various (Note: It has campuses in Franklin; Suffolk and Isle of Wight, Virginia.)
Paul Quinn College	Tigers	Dallas, Texas
Paul Smith's College	Bobcats	Paul Smiths, New York

=== PE ===
Institution	Nickname	Location
Pearl River Community College	Wildcats	Poplarville, Mississippi
Pellissippi State Community College	Panthers	Hardin Valley, Tennessee
Peninsula College	Pirates	Port Angeles, Washington
University of Pennsylvania (Penn)	Quakers	Philadelphia, Pennsylvania
Pennsylvania Highlands Community College (Penn Highlands)	Black Bears	Johnstown, Pennsylvania
Pennsylvania State University (Penn State)	Nittany Lions (Note: Women's basketball team uses Lady Lions. Penn State's 19 other Commonwealth campuses aside from its main campus in State College sponsor separate athletic programs. The teams at the Abington, Altoona, Beaver, Berks, Brandywine, DuBois, Hazleton, Lehigh Valley, Mont Alto, New Kensington, Schuylkill, Scranton, Wilkes-Barre and York campuses are called the Nittany Lions. The teams at the Behrend, Greater Allegheny, Harrisburg and Shenango campuses are called the Lions. The teams at the Fayette campus are called the Roaring Lions. In 2025, the Penn State Board of Trustees announced that the DuBois, Fayette, Mont Alto, New Kensington, Shenango, Wilkes-Barre and York campuses would all be closed following the 2026–27 academic year.)	State College, Pennsylvania (Note: Penn State has campuses in Abington, Carlisle (Dickinson Law campus), Center Township (Beaver campus), Center Valley (Lehigh Valley campus), DuBois, Dunmore (Scranton campus), Erie (Behrend campus), Hazleton, Hershey (College of Medicine campus), Lemont Furnace (Fayette campus), Lehman Township (Wilkes-Barre campus), Logan Township (Altoona campus), Lower Swatara Township (Harrisburg campus), Malvern (Great Valley Graduate Professional Studies campus), McKeesport (Greater Allegheny campus), Middletown Township (Brandywine campus), Mont Alto, New Kensington, Schuylkill Haven (Schuylkill campus), Sharon (Shenango campus), Spring Township (Berks campus), University Park (flagship campus), and York.)
Pennsylvania College of Technology (Penn Tech)	Wildcats	Williamsport, Pennsylvania
Pensacola Christian College	Eagles	Pensacola, Florida
Pensacola State College	Pirates	Pensacola, Florida
Pepperdine University	Waves	Malibu, California
Peru State College	Bobcats	Peru, Nebraska

=== PF–PI ===
Institution	Nickname	Location
Pfeiffer University	Falcons	Misenheimer, North Carolina
Philander Smith University	Panthers	Little Rock, Arkansas
Phoenix College	Bears	Phoenix, Arizona
Piedmont Community College	Pacers	Roxboro, North Carolina
Piedmont University	Lions	Athens, Georgia
Piedmont Virginia Community College	Panthers	Charlottesville, Virginia
Pierce College	Raiders	Lakewood and Puyallup, Washington
Pierpont Community and Technical College	Lions	Fairmont, West Virginia
University of Pikeville	Bears	Pikeville, Kentucky
Pikes Peak State College	Aardvarks	Colorado Springs, Colorado
Pillar College	Panthers	Newark, New Jersey
Pima Community College	Aztecs	Tucson, Arizona
Pitt Community College	Bruisers	Winterville, North Carolina
Pittsburg State University (Note: It may also be known as Pitt State.)	Gorillas	Pittsburg, Kansas
University of Pittsburgh (Note: Also referred to as Pitt.)	Panthers	Pittsburgh, Pennsylvania
University of Pittsburgh at Bradford (Note: It is also known as Pitt–Bradford.)	Panthers	Bradford, Pennsylvania
University of Pittsburgh at Greensburg (Note: It is also known as Pitt–Greensburg.)	Bobcats	Hempfield Township, Pennsylvania
University of Pittsburgh at Johnstown (Note: It is also known as Pitt–Johnstown.)	Mountain Cats	Richland Township, Pennsylvania
University of Pittsburgh at Titusville (Note: It is also known as Pitt–Titusville.)	Panthers	Titusville, Pennsylvania
Pitzer College	Sagehens (Note: Pitzer operates a joint athletic program with Pomona College, it is branded as Pomona–Pitzer.)	Claremont, California

=== PL–PR ===
Institution	Nickname	Location
Plymouth State University	Panthers	Plymouth, New Hampshire
Point University	Skyhawks	West Point, Georgia
Point Loma Nazarene University	Sea Lions	San Diego, California
Point Park University	Pioneers	Pittsburgh, Pennsylvania
Pomona College	Sagehens (Note: Pomona operates a joint athletic program with Pitzer College, it is branded as Pomona–Pitzer.)	Claremont, California
Polk State College	Eagles	Winter Haven, Florida
Porterville College	Pirates	Porterville, California
Portland Community College	Panthers	Portland, Oregon
University of Portland	Pilots	Portland, Oregon
Portland Bible College	Arrows	Portland, Oregon
Portland State University	Vikings	Portland, Oregon
Post University	Eagles	Waterbury, Connecticut
Potomac State College of West Virginia University (Potomac State)	Catamounts	Keyser, West Virginia
Prairie State College	Pioneers	Chicago Heights, Illinois
Prairie View A&M University	Panthers and Lady Panthers	Prairie View, Texas
Pratt Community College	Beavers	Pratt, Kansas
Presbyterian College	Blue Hose	Clinton, South Carolina
Prince George's Community College	Owls	Largo, Maryland
Princeton University	Tigers	Princeton, New Jersey
Principia College	Panthers	Elsah, Illinois
Providence College	Friars	Providence, Rhode Island

=== PU ===
Institution	Nickname	Location
Pueblo Community College	Panthers	Pueblo, Colorado
University of Puerto Rico at Arecibo	Wolves	Arecibo, Puerto Rico
University of Puerto Rico at Bayamón	Cowboys	Bayamón, Puerto Rico
University of Puerto Rico at Humacao	Búhos and Búhas (Note: Owls and Lady Owls in Spanish.)	Humacao, Puerto Rico
University of Puerto Rico at Mayagüez	Bulldogs (Note: Men's teams are also known as Tarzans/Tarzanes, and women's teams also uses Janes/Juanas.)	Mayagüez, Puerto Rico
University of Puerto Rico at Ponce	Lions	Ponce, Puerto Rico
University of Puerto Rico at Utuado	Guaraguaos (Note: Red-tailed Hawks in Spanish.)	Utuado, Puerto Rico
University of Puget Sound	Loggers	Tacoma, Washington
Purdue University	Boilermakers	West Lafayette, Indiana
Purdue University Fort Wayne	Mastodons	Fort Wayne, Indiana
Purdue University Northwest	Pride	Hammond and Westville, Indiana

== Q ==
Institution	Nickname	Location
Queens College, City University of New York	Knights	New York City, New York
Queens University of Charlotte	Royals	Charlotte, North Carolina
Queensborough Community College	Tigers	New York City, New York
Quincy College	Granite	Quincy, Massachusetts
Quincy University	Hawks	Quincy, Illinois
Quinebaug Valley Community College	Frogs	Danielson, Connecticut
Quinnipiac University	Bobcats	Hamden, Connecticut
Quinsigamond Community College	Wyverns and Lady Wyverns	Worcester, Massachusetts

== R ==
=== RA ===
Institution	Nickname	Location
Radford University	Highlanders	Radford, Virginia
Ramapo College	Roadrunners	Mahwah, New Jersey
Randall University	Saints and Lady Saints	Moore, Oklahoma
Randolph Community College	Armadillos	Asheboro, North Carolina
Randolph College	WildCats	Lynchburg, Virginia
Randolph–Macon College	Yellow Jackets	Ashland, Virginia
Ranger College	Rangers	Ranger, Texas
Rappahannock Community College	Gulls	Various
Raritan Valley Community College	Golden Lions	Branchburg, New Jersey

=== RE ===
Institution	Nickname	Location
Reading Area Community College	Ravens	Reading, Pennsylvania
Red Rocks Community College	Red Foxes	Lakewood, Colorado
Redlands Community College	Cougars	El Reno, Oklahoma
University of Redlands	Bulldogs	Redlands, California
College of the Redwoods	Corsairs	Eureka, California
Reed College	Griffins	Portland, Oregon
Reedley College	Tigers	Reedley, California
Regent University	Royals	Virginia Beach, Virginia
Regis College	Pride	Weston, Massachusetts
Regis University	Rangers	Denver, Colorado
Reinhardt University	Eagles	Waleska, Georgia
Rend Lake College	Warriors	Ina, Illinois
Rensselaer Polytechnic Institute (RPI)	Engineers	Troy, New York

=== RH–RI ===
Institution	Nickname	Location
University of Rhode Island	Rams	Kingston, Rhode Island
Rhode Island College	Anchormen	Providence and North Providence, Rhode Island
Rhode Island School of Design (RISD)	Nads	Providence, Rhode Island
Rhodes College	Lynx	Memphis, Tennessee
Rice University	Owls	Houston, Texas
Richard Bland College	Statesmen	Prince George, Virginia
Dallas College Richland (Richland)	Thunderducks	Dallas, Texas
Richmond Community College	Panthers	Hamlet, North Carolina
University of Richmond	Spiders	Richmond, Virginia
Rider University	Broncs	Lawrenceville, New Jersey
Ridgewater College	Warriors	Willmar and Hutchinson, Minnesota
University of Rio Grande	RedStorm	Rio Grande, Ohio
Rio Hondo College	Roadrunners	Whittier, California
Ripon College	Red Hawks	Ripon, Wisconsin
River Parishes Community College	Rougarous	Gonzales, Louisiana
Riverland Community College	Blue Devils	Various (Note: It has campuses in Austin; Albert Lea and Owatonna, Minnesota.)
Riverside City College	Tigers	Riverside, California
Rivier University	Raiders	Nashua, New Hampshire

=== ROA–ROC ===
Institution	Nickname	Location
Roane State Community College	Raiders	Harriman, Tennessee
Roanoke College	Maroons	Salem, Virginia
Roanoke–Chowan Community College	Waves	Ahoskie, North Carolina
Robert Morris University	Colonials	Moon Township, Pennsylvania
Roberts Wesleyan University	Redhawks	North Chili, New York
University of Rochester	Yellowjackets	Rochester, New York
Rochester Christian University	Warriors	Rochester Hills, Michigan
Rochester Community and Technical College	Yellowjackets	Rochester, Minnesota
Rochester Institute of Technology (RIT)	Tigers	Henrietta, New York
Rock Valley College	Golden Eagles	Rockford, Illinois
Rockford University	Regents	Rockford, Illinois
Rockhurst University	Hawks	Kansas City, Missouri
Rockingham Community College	Eagles	Wentworth, North Carolina
Rockland Community College	Fighting Hawks	Suffern, New York
Rocky Mountain College	Battlin' Bears	Billings, Montana

=== ROG–RU ===
Institution	Nickname	Location
Roger Williams University	Hawks	Bristol, Rhode Island
Rogers State University	Hillcats	Claremore, Oklahoma
Rogue Community College	Ospreys	Various (Note: It has campuses in Grants Pass; Medford and White City, Oregon.)
Rollins College	Tars	Winter Park, Florida
Roosevelt University	Lakers	Chicago, Illinois
Rose State College	Raiders	Midwest City, Oklahoma
Rose–Hulman Institute of Technology (Rose-Hulman)	Fightin' Engineers	Terre Haute, Indiana
Rosemont College	Ravens	Rosemont, Pennsylvania
Rowan University	Profs	Glassboro, New Jersey
Rowan–Cabarrus Community College	Warriors	Various (Note: It has campuses in Salisbury; Concord and Kannapolis, North Carolina.)
Rowan College of South Jersey	Roadrunners (Note: It is branded as Rowan–Gloucester.)	Sewell, New Jersey
Rowan College of South Jersey	Dukes (Note: It is branded as Rowan–Cumberland.)	Vineland and Millville, New Jersey
Roxbury Community College	Tigers	Boston, Massachusetts
Russell Sage College	Gators	Albany, New York
Rust College	Bearcats	Holly Springs, Mississippi
Rutgers University–New Brunswick (Rutgers)	Scarlet Knights	New Brunswick and Piscataway, New Jersey
Rutgers University–Camden	Scarlet Raptors	Camden, New Jersey
Rutgers University–Newark	Scarlet Raiders	Newark, New Jersey

== S ==
=== SAC–SAG ===
Institution	Nickname	Location
Sacramento City College	Panthers	Sacramento, California
Sacred Heart University	Pioneers	Fairfield, Connecticut
Saddleback College	Bobcats	Mission Viejo, California
Saginaw Valley State University	Cardinals	University Center, Michigan

=== SAINT A–SAINT J ===
Institution	Nickname	Location
St. Ambrose University	Fighting Bees	Davenport, Iowa
Saint Anselm College	Hawks	Goffstown, New Hampshire
St. Augustine's University	Falcons	Raleigh, North Carolina
College of Saint Benedict and Saint John's University	Bennies (Note: They only represent College of Saint Benedict.)	St. Joseph, Minnesota
College of Saint Benedict and Saint John's University	Johnnies (Note: They only represent Saint John's University.)	Collegeville, Minnesota
St. Bonaventure University	Bonnies	St. Bonaventure, New York
St. Catherine University	Wildcats	Minneapolis–Saint Paul, Minnesota
St. Charles Community College	Cougars	St. Charles, Missouri
St. Clair County Community College	Skippers	Port Huron, Michigan
St. Cloud State University	Huskies	St. Cloud, Minnesota
St. Cloud Technical and Community College	Cyclones	St. Cloud, Minnesota
St. Edward's University	Hilltoppers	Austin, Texas
Saint Elizabeth University	Eagles	Morris Township, New Jersey
University of St. Francis	Fighting Saints	Joliet, Illinois
University of Saint Francis	Cougars	Fort Wayne, Indiana
Saint Francis University	Red Wolves	Loretto, Pennsylvania
St. John Fisher University	Cardinals	Rochester, New York
St. John's College	Johnnies	Annapolis, Maryland and Santa Fe, New Mexico
St. John's University	Red Storm	New York City, New York
St. Johns River State College	Vikings	Palatka, Florida
University of Saint Joseph	Blue Jays	West Hartford, Connecticut
St. Joseph's University	Bears (Note: The athletics are branded as St. Joseph's–Brooklyn.)	Brooklyn, New York
St. Joseph's University	Golden Eagles (Note: The athletics are branded as St. Joseph's–Long Island.)	Patchogue, New York
Saint Joseph's College of Maine	Monks	Standish, Maine
Saint Joseph's University	Hawks	Philadelphia, Pennsylvania

=== SAINT L–SAINT X ===
Institution	Nickname	Location
St. Lawrence University	Saints	Canton, New York
Saint Leo University	Lions	St. Leo, Florida
Saint Louis University	Billikens	St. Louis, Missouri
St. Louis Community College	Archers	St. Louis, Missouri
College of Saint Mary	Flames	Omaha, Nebraska
University of Saint Mary	Spires	Leavenworth, Kansas
Saint Mary's College	Belles	Notre Dame, Indiana
Saint Mary's College of California	Gaels	Moraga, California
St. Mary's College of Maryland	Seahawks	St. Mary's City, Maryland
Saint Mary's University of Minnesota	Cardinals	Minneapolis and Winona, Minnesota
St. Mary's University, Texas	Rattlers	San Antonio, Texas
Saint Mary-of-the-Woods College	Pomeroys	Saint Mary-of-the-Woods, Indiana
Saint Martin's University	Saints	Lacey, Washington
Saint Michael's College	Purple Knights	Colchester, Vermont
St. Norbert College	Green Knights	De Pere, Wisconsin
St. Olaf College	Oles	Northfield, Minnesota
St. Petersburg College	Titans	St. Petersburg, Florida
Saint Peter's University	Peacocks and Peahens	Jersey City, New Jersey
St. Philip's College	Tigers	San Antonio, Texas
College of St. Scholastica	Saints	Duluth, Minnesota
St. Thomas University	Bobcats	Miami Gardens, Florida
University of St. Thomas	Tommies	Saint Paul, Minnesota
University of St. Thomas	Celts	Houston, Texas
St. Thomas Aquinas College	Spartans	Sparkill, New York
Saint Vincent College	Bearcats	Latrobe, Pennsylvania
Saint Xavier University	Cougars	Chicago, Illinois

=== SAL–SAM ===
Institution	Nickname	Location
Salem Community College	Mighty Oaks	Carneys Point Township, New Jersey
Salem College	Spirits	Winston-Salem, North Carolina
Salem University	Tigers	Salem, West Virginia
Salem State University	Vikings	Salem, Massachusetts
Salisbury University	Sea Gulls	Salisbury, Maryland
Salish Kootenai College	Bison and Lady Bison	Pablo, Montana
Salt Lake Community College	Bruins	Salt Lake County, Utah
Salve Regina University	Seahawks	Newport, Rhode Island
Sam Houston State University	Bearkats	Huntsville, Texas
Samford University	Bulldogs	Homewood, Alabama
Sampson Community College	Vikings	Clinton, North Carolina

=== SAN ===
Institution	Nickname	Location
San Antonio College	Armadillos	San Antonio, Texas
San Bernardino Valley College	Wolverines	San Bernardino, California
University of San Diego	Toreros	San Diego, California
San Diego Christian College	Hawks	Santee, California
San Diego City College	Knights	San Diego, California
San Diego State University	Aztecs	San Diego, California
University of San Francisco	Dons	San Francisco, California
San Francisco State University	Gators	San Francisco, California
San Joaquin Delta College	Mustangs	Stockton, California
San Jose City College	Jaguars	San Jose, California
San Jose State University	Spartans	San Jose, California
College of San Mateo	Bulldogs	San Mateo, California
Sandhills Community College	Flyers	Pinehurst, North Carolina

=== SANTA–SANTI ===
Institution	Nickname	Location
Santa Ana College	Dons	Santa Ana, California
Santa Barbara City College	Vaqueros	Santa Barbara, California
Santa Clara University	Broncos	Santa Clara, California
Santa Fe Community College	Saints	Santa Fe, New Mexico
Santa Fe College	Saints	Gainesville, Florida
Santa Monica College	Corsairs	Santa Monica, California
Santa Rosa Junior College	Bear Cubs	Santa Rosa, California
Santiago Canyon College	Hawks	Orange, California

=== SAR–SC ===
Institution	Nickname	Location
Sarah Lawrence College	Gryphons	Yonkers, New York
Savannah State University	Tigers and Lady Tigers	Savannah, Georgia
Savannah College of Art and Design (SCAD)	Bees	Savannah, Georgia
Sauk Valley Community College	Skyhawks	Dixon, Illinois
Schoolcraft College	Ocelots	Livonia, Michigan
Scott Community College	Eagles	Riverdale, Iowa
Scottsdale Community College	Fighting Artichokes	Scottsdale, Arizona
Schenectady County Community College	Royals	Schenectady, New York
Schreiner University	Mountaineers	Kerrville, Texas
University of Scranton	Royals	Scranton, Pennsylvania
Scripps College	Stags and Athenas	Claremont, California

=== SE ===
Institution	Nickname	Location
Seattle University	Redhawks	Seattle, Washington
Seattle Pacific University	Falcons	Seattle, Washington
Seminole State College	Trojans	Seminole, Oklahoma
Seminole State College of Florida	Raiders	Sanford, Florida
College of the Sequoias	Giants	Visalia, California
Seton Hall University	Pirates	South Orange, New Jersey
Seton Hill University	Griffins	Greensburg, Pennsylvania
Sewanee: The University of the South	Tigers	Sewanee, Tennessee
Seward County Community College	Saints	Liberal, Kansas

=== SH ===
Institution	Nickname	Location
Shasta College	Knights	Redding, California
Shaw University	Bears	Raleigh, North Carolina
Shawnee Community College	Saints	Ullin, Illinois
Shawnee State University	Bears	Portsmouth, Ohio
Shelton State Community College	Buccaneers	Tuscaloosa, Alabama
Shenandoah University	Hornets	Winchester, Virginia
Shepherd University	Rams	Shepherdstown, Virginia
Sheridan College	Generals	Sheridan, Wyoming
Shippensburg University	Raiders	Shippensburg, Pennsylvania
Shoreline Community College	Dolphins	Shoreline, Washington
Shorter College	Bulldogs	North Little Rock, Arkansas
Shorter University	Hawks	Rome, Georgia

=== SI ===
Institution	Nickname	Location
Siena University	Saints	Loudonville, New York
Siena Heights University	Saints	Adrian, Michigan
Sierra College	Wolverines	Rocklin, California
University of Silicon Valley	Dragons	San Jose, California
Simmons College of Kentucky	Falcons	Louisville, Kentucky
Simmons University	Sharks	Boston, Massachusetts
Simpson College	Storm	Indianola, Iowa
Simpson University	Red Hawks	Redding, California
Sinclair Community College	Tartan Pride	Dayton, Ohio
University of Sioux Falls	Cougars	Sioux Falls, South Dakota
College of the Siskiyous	Eagles	Weed, California
Sisseton Wahpeton College	Mustangs	Sisseton, South Dakota
Sitting Bull College	Suns	Fort Yates, North Dakota

=== SK–SON ===
Institution	Nickname	Location
Skagit Valley College	Cardinals	Mount Vernon, Washington
Skidmore College	Thorobreds	Saratoga Springs, New York
Skyline College	Trojans	San Bruno, California
Slippery Rock University	The Rock (Note: Unofficial nickname. Also known simply as Slippery Rock University athletics.)	Slippery Rock, Pennsylvania
Smith College	Bears	Northampton, Massachusetts
Snead State Community College	Parsons	Boaz, Alabama
Snow College	Badgers	Ephraim, Utah
Soka University of America	Lions	Aliso Viejo, California
Solano Community College	Falcons	Fairfield, California

=== SOUTH ===
Institution	Nickname	Location
University of South Alabama	Jaguars	Mobile, Alabama
South Arkansas College	Stars	El Dorado, Arkansas
University of South Carolina	Gamecocks	Columbia, South Carolina
University of South Carolina Aiken (USC Aiken)	Pacers	Aiken, South Carolina
University of South Carolina Beaufort (USC Beaufort)	Sand Sharks	Beaufort, South Carolina
University of South Carolina Lancaster (USC Lancaster)	Lancers	Lancaster, South Carolina
University of South Carolina Salkehatchie (USC Salkehatchie)	Indians	Allendale and Walterboro, South Carolina
University of South Carolina Union (USC Union)	Bantams	Union, South Carolina
University of South Carolina Upstate (USC Upstate)	Spartans	Spartanburg, South Carolina
South Carolina State University	Bulldogs and Lady Bulldogs	Orangeburg, South Carolina
University of South Dakota	Coyotes	Vermillion, South Dakota
South Dakota School of Mines and Technology (South Dakota Mines)	Hardrockers	Rapid City, South Dakota
South Dakota State University	Jackrabbits	Brookings, South Dakota
University of South Florida	Bulls	Tampa, Florida
South Florida State College	Panthers	Various (Note: It has campuses in Highlands County; DeSoto County and Hardee County, Florida.)
South Georgia State College	Hawks	Douglas and Waycross, Georgia
South Georgia Technical College	Jets	Americus, Georgia
South Mountain Community College	Cougars	Phoenix, Arizona
South Piedmont Community College	Patriots	Various (Note: It has campuses in Polkton; Monroe and Wadesboro, North Carolina.)
South Plains College	Texans	Levelland, Texas
South Puget Sound Community College	Clippers	Olympia, Washington
South Suburban College	Bulldogs	South Holland and Oak Forest, Illinois

=== SOUTHEAST ===
Institution	Nickname	Location
Southeast Community College	Storm	Various (Note: It has campuses in Lincoln; Beatrice and Milford, Nebraska.)
Southeast Arkansas College	Sharks	Pine Bluff, Arkansas
Southeast Missouri State University	Redhawks	Cape Girardeau, Missouri
Southeastern University	Fire	Lakeland, Florida
Southeastern Baptist College	Chargers	Laurel, Mississippi
Southeastern Community College	Blackhawks	Burlington and Keokuk, Iowa
Southeastern Community College	Rams	Chadbourn and Whiteville, North Carolina
Southeastern Illinois College	Falcons	Harrisburg, Illinois
Southeastern Louisiana University	Lions and Lady Lions	Hammond, Louisiana
Southeastern Oklahoma State University	Savage Storm	Durant, Oklahoma
Southeastern Technical College	Patriots	Vidalia, Georgia

=== SOUTHERN–SOUTHSIDE ===
Institution	Nickname	Location
Southern University	Jaguars and Lady Jaguars	Baton Rouge, Louisiana
Southern University at New Orleans	Knights and Lady Knights	New Orleans, Louisiana
Southern Arkansas University	Muleriders	Magnolia, Arkansas
University of Southern California (USC)	Trojans	Los Angeles, California
Southern Connecticut State University	Owls (Note: They are also known as Fighting Owls.)	New Haven, Connecticut
Southern Crescent Technical College	Tigers	Griffin and Thomaston, Georgia
College of Southern Idaho	Golden Eagles	Twin Falls, Idaho
Southern Illinois University Carbondale (Southern Illinois)	Salukis	Carbondale, Illinois
Southern Illinois University Edwardsville (SIU Edwardsville)	Cougars	Edwardsville, Illinois
University of Southern Indiana	Screaming Eagles	Evansville, Indiana
University of Southern Maine	Huskies	Various (Note: It has campuses in Portland; Gorham and Lewiston, Maine.)
Southern Maine Community College	Seawolves	South Portland, Maine
College of Southern Maryland	Hawks	Various (Note: It has campuses in Hughesville; La Plata; Leonardtown and Prince Frederick, Maryland.)
Southern Methodist University (SMU)	Mustangs	University Park, Texas
University of Southern Mississippi	Golden Eagles	Hattiesburg, Mississippi
Southern Nazarene University	Crimson Storm	Bethany, Oklahoma
College of Southern Nevada	Coyotes	Clark County, Nevada
Southern New Hampshire University	Penmen	Hooksett and Manchester, New Hampshire
Southern Oregon University	Raiders	Ashland, Oregon
Southern State Community College	Patriots	Hillsboro, Ohio
Southern Union State Community College	Bison	Various (Note: It has campuses in Opelika; Wadley and Valley, Alabama.)
Southern Utah University	Thunderbirds	Cedar City, Utah
Southern Virginia University	Knights	Buena Vista, Virginia
Southern Wesleyan University	Warriors	Central, South Carolina
Southside Virginia Community College	Panthers	Alberta and Keysville, Virginia

=== SOUTHWEST ===
Institution	Nickname	Location
University of the Southwest	Mustangs	Hobbs, New Mexico
Southwest Baptist University	Bearcats	Bolivar, Missouri
Southwest Minnesota State University	Mustangs	Marshall, Minnesota
Southwest Mississippi Community College	Bears	Summit, Mississippi
Southwest Tennessee Community College	Saluqis	Memphis, Tennessee
Southwest Texas Junior College	Cowboys	Uvalde, Texas
Southwest Virginia Community College	Flying Eagles	Cedar Bluff, Virginia
Southwest Wisconsin Technical College	Chargers	Fennimore, Wisconsin

=== SOUTHWESTERN–SOW ===
Institution	Nickname	Location
Southwestern University	Pirates	Georgetown, Texas
Southwestern Adventist University	Knights	Keene, Texas
Southwestern College	Jaguars	Chula Vista, California
Southwestern College	Moundbuilders	Winfield, Kansas
Southwestern Christian College	Rams	Terrell, Texas
Southwestern Christian University	Eagles	Bethany, Oklahoma
Southwestern Community College	Spartans	Creston, Iowa
Southwestern Illinois College	Blue Storm	Various (Note: It has campuses in Belleville; Granite City and Red Bud, Illinois.)
Southwestern Michigan College	Roadrunners	Dowagiac, Michigan
Southwestern Oklahoma State University	Bulldogs	Weatherford, Oklahoma
Sowela Technical Community College	Flying Tigers	Lake Charles, Louisiana

=== SP ===
Institution	Nickname	Location
Spalding University	Golden Eagles	Louisville, Kentucky
Spartanburg Community College	Chasers	Spartanburg, South Carolina
Spartanburg Methodist College	Pioneers	Saxon, South Carolina
Spelman College	Jaguars	Atlanta, Georgia
Spoon River College	Snappers	Canton, Illinois
Spring Arbor University	Cougars	Spring Arbor, Michigan
Spring Hill College	Badgers	Mobile, Alabama
Springfield College	Pride	Springfield, Massachusetts
Springfield Technical Community College	Rams	Springfield, Massachusetts

=== STA–STE ===
Institution	Nickname	Location
Stanford University	Cardinal	Stanford, California
Stanly Community College	Eagles	Locust, North Carolina
Stanton University	Elks	Anaheim, California
Stark State College	Spartans	Jackson Township, Ohio
State College of Florida, Manatee–Sarasota	Manatees	Bradenton, Florida
State Fair Community College	Roadrunners	Sedalia, Missouri
State Technical College of Missouri	Eagles	Linn, Missouri
College of Staten Island	Dolphins	Staten Island, New York
Stephen F. Austin State University	Lumberjacks and Ladyjacks	Nacogdoches, Texas
Stephens College	Stars	Columbia, Missouri
Sterling College	Warriors	Sterling, Kansas
Stetson University	Hatters	DeLand, Florida
Stevens Institute of Technology	Ducks	Hoboken, New Jersey
Stevenson University	Mustangs	Owings Mills and Stevenson, Maryland

=== STI–SUL ===
Institution	Nickname	Location
Stillman College	Tigers and Lady Tigers	Tuscaloosa, Alabama
Stockton University	Ospreys	Galloway Township, New Jersey
Stonehill College	Skyhawks	Easton, Massachusetts
Stony Brook University	Seawolves	Stony Brook, New York
Stony Brook Southampton	Colonials	Southampton, New York
Suffolk County Community College	Sharks	Selden, New York
Suffolk University	Rams	Boston, Massachusetts
Sul Ross State University	Lobos	Alpine, Texas

=== SUNY ===
Institution	Nickname	Location
State University of New York at Cobleskill	Fighting Tigers	Cobleskill, New York
State University of New York at Canton	Kangaroos	Canton, New York
State University of New York at Cortland	Red Dragons	Cortland, New York
State University of New York at Delhi	Broncos	Delhi, New York
State University of New York College of Environmental Science and Forestry (SUNY ESF)	Mighty Oaks	Syracuse, New York
State University of New York at Fredonia	Blue Devils	Fredonia, New York
State University of New York at Geneseo	Knights	Geneseo, New York
State University of New York Maritime College	Privateers	Various
State University of New York at Morrisville	Mustangs	Morrisville, New York
State University of New York at New Paltz	Hawks	New Paltz, New York
State University of New York at Old Westbury	Panthers	Old Westbury, New York
State University of New York at Oneonta	Red Dragons	Oneonta, New York
State University of New York at Oswego	Lakers	Oswego, New York
State University of New York at Plattsburgh	Cardinals	Plattsburgh, New York
State University of New York at Potsdam	Bears	Potsdam, New York
State University of New York at Purchase	Panthers	Purchase, New York
SUNY Adirondack	Timberwolves	Queensbury, New York
SUNY Brockport	Golden Eagles	Brockport, New York
SUNY Broome Community College	Hornets	Broome County, New York
SUNY Erie	Kats	Williamsville, New York
SUNY Niagara	Thunderwolves	Sanborn, New York
SUNY Orange	Colts	Middletown, New York
SUNY Polytechnic Institute	Wildcats	Marcy, New York
SUNY Sullivan	Generals	Loch Sheldrake, New York
SUNY Ulster	Senators	Stone Ridge, New York

=== SUR–SY ===
Institution	Nickname	Location
Surry Community College	Knights	Dobson, North Carolina
Susquehanna University	River Hawks	Selinsgrove, Pennsylvania
Sussex County Community College	Skylanders	Newton, New Jersey
Swarthmore College	Garnet	Swarthmore, Pennsylvania
Sweet Briar College	Vixens	Amherst County, Virginia
Syracuse University	Orange	Syracuse, New York

== T ==
=== TA ===
Institution	Nickname	Location
Tabor College	Bluejays	Hillsboro, Kansas
Tacoma Community College	Titans	Tacoma, Washington
Taft College	Cougars	Taft, California
Talladega College	Tornadoes	Talladega, Alabama
Tallahassee State College	Eagles	Tallahassee, Florida
University of Tampa	Spartans	Tampa, Florida
Tarleton State University	Texans	Stephenville, Texas
Taylor University	Trojans	Upland, Indiana

=== TEC-TER ===
Institution	Nickname	Location
Technical College of the Lowcountry (TCL)	Pride	Beaufort, South Carolina
Temple University	Owls	Philadelphia, Pennsylvania
University of Tennessee	Volunteers and Lady Volunteers	Knoxville, Tennessee
University of Tennessee at Chattanooga (Chattanooga)	Mocs	Chattanooga, Tennessee
University of Tennessee at Martin (UT Martin)	Skyhawks	Martin, Tennessee
University of Tennessee Southern (UT Southern)	FireHawks	Pulaski, Tennessee
Tennessee State University	Tigers and Lady Tigers	Nashville, Tennessee
Tennessee Technological University	Golden Eagles	Cookeville, Tennessee
Tennessee Wesleyan University	Bulldogs	Athens, Tennessee
Terra State Community College	Titans	Fremont, Ohio

=== TEX ===
Institution	Nickname	Location
Texarkana College	Bulldogs	Texarkana, Texas
University of Texas at Arlington (UT Arlington)	Mavericks	Arlington, Texas
University of Texas at Austin (Texas)	Longhorns	Austin, Texas
University of Texas at Dallas (UT Dallas)	Comets	Richardson, Texas
University of Texas at El Paso (UTEP)	Miners	El Paso, Texas
University of Texas Permian Basin (UT Permian Basin)	Falcons	Odessa, Texas
University of Texas Rio Grande Valley (UT Rio Grande Valley) (Note: Also known as UTRGV, Rio Grande Valley or simply Rio Grande.)	Vaqueros	Edinburg, Texas
University of Texas at San Antonio (UTSA)	Roadrunners	San Antonio, Texas
University of Texas at Tyler (UT Tyler)	Patriots	Tyler, Texas
Texas A&M University	Aggies (Note: Also known simply as Texas Aggies.)	College Station, Texas
Texas A&M University–Central Texas	Warriors	Killeen, Texas
Texas A&M University–Corpus Christi	Islanders	Corpus Christi, Texas
Texas A&M University at Galveston	Sea Aggies	Galveston, Texas
Texas A&M International University	Dustdevils	Laredo, Texas
Texas A&M University–Kingsville	Javelinas	Kingsville, Texas
Texas A&M University–San Antonio	Jaguars	San Antonio, Texas
Texas A&M University–Texarkana	Eagles	Texarkana, Texas
Texas A&M University–Victoria	Jaguars	Victoria, Texas
Texas Christian University (TCU)	Horned Frogs	Fort Worth, Texas
Texas College	Steers	Tyler, Texas
Texas Lutheran University	Bulldogs	Seguin, Texas
Texas Southern University	Tigers	Houston, Texas
Texas Southmost College	Scorpions	Brownsville, Texas
Texas State University	Bobcats	San Marcos, Texas
Texas Tech University	Red Raiders (Note: The women's basketball team uses Lady Raiders.)	Lubbock, Texas
Texas Wesleyan University	Rams	Fort Worth, Texas
Texas Woman's University	Pioneers	Denton, Texas

=== TH–TI ===
Institution	Nickname	Location
Thaddeus Stevens College of Technology (Thaddeus Stevens)	Bulldogs	Lancaster, Pennsylvania
Thiel College	Tomcats	Greenville, Pennsylvania
Thomas College	Terriers	Waterville, Maine
Thomas University	Night Hawks	Thomasville, Georgia
Thomas More University	Saints	Crestview Hills, Kentucky
Three Rivers College	Raiders	Poplar Bluff, Missouri
Tidewater Community College	Storm	Various (Note: It has campuses in Chesapeake; Norfolk; Portsmouth; Suffolk and Virginia Beach, Virginia.)
Tiffin University	Dragons	Tiffin, Ohio

=== TO ===
Institution	Nickname	Location
Toccoa Falls College	Screaming Eagles	Toccoa, Georgia
Tohono Oʼodham Community College	Jegos	Haivana Nakya, Arizona
University of Toledo	Rockets	Toledo, Ohio
Tompkins Cortland Community College	Panthers	Dryden, New York
Tougaloo College	Bulldogs	Jackson, Mississippi
Touro University	Bulls	New York City, New York
Towson University (Note: It may also be known as Towson State due to its former names.)	Tigers	Towson, Maryland

=== TR ===
Institution	Nickname	Location
Transylvania University	Pioneers	Lexington, Kentucky
Treasure Valley Community College	Chukars	Ontario, Oregon
H. Councill Trenholm State Community College (Trenholm State)	Beavers	Montgomery, Alabama
Trevecca Nazarene University	Trojans	Nashville, Tennessee
Tri-County Technical College	Hawks	Pendleton, South Carolina
Trine University	Thunder	Angola and Fort Wayne, Indiana
Trinidad State College	Trojans	Trinidad, Colorado
Trinity College	Bantams	Hartford, Connecticut
Trinity College of Florida	Tigers	Trinity, Florida
Trinity College of Jacksonville	Eagles	Jacksonville, Florida
Trinity University	Tigers	San Antonio, Texas
Trinity Bible College and Graduate School	Lions	Ellendale, North Dakota
Trinity Christian College	Trolls	Palos Heights, Illinois
Trinity Valley Community College	Cardinals	Athens, Texas
Trinity Washington University	Tigers	Washington, D.C.
Triton College	Trojans	River Grove, Illinois
Trocaire College	Bruins	Buffalo, New York
Troy University	Trojans	Troy, Alabama
Truckee Meadows Community College	Lizards	Reno, Nevada
Truett McConnell University	Bears	Cleveland, Georgia
Truman College	Falcons	Chicago, Illinois
Truman State University	Bulldogs	Kirksville, Missouri

=== TU–TY ===
Institution	Nickname	Location
Tufts University	Jumbos	Medford, Massachusetts
Tulane University	Green Wave	New Orleans, Louisiana
University of Tulsa	Golden Hurricane	Tulsa, Oklahoma
Turtle Mountain College	Mighty Mikinocks	Belcourt, North Dakota
Tusculum University	Pioneers	Tusculum, Tennessee
Tuskegee University	Golden Tigers (Note: Women's teams are named Tigerettes.)	Tuskegee, Alabama
Tyler Junior College	Apaches	Tyler, Texas

== U ==
Institution	Nickname	Location
University of Health Sciences and Pharmacy in St. Louis (UHSP)	Eutectics	St. Louis, Missouri
Umpqua Community College	Riverhawks	Roseburg, Oregon
Union Adventist University	Warriors	Lincoln, Nebraska
Union College	Garnet Chargers	Schenectady, New York
Union College	Owls	Various (Note: It has campuses in Cranford; Elizabeth; Plainfield and Scotch Plains, New Jersey.)
Union Commonwealth University	Bulldogs	Barbourville, Kentucky
Union Presbyterian Seminary	Squirrels	Richmond, Virginia
Union University	Bulldogs	Jackson, Tennessee
United States Sports University	Eagles	Daphne, Alabama
United Tribes Technical College	Thunderbirds (Note: They are also known as T-Birds.)	Bismarck, North Dakota
Upper Iowa University	Peacocks	Fayette, Iowa
Ursinus College	Bears	Collegeville, Pennsylvania
Ursuline College	Arrows	Pepper Pike, Ohio
University of Utah	Utes (Note: Men's basketball team is also known as Runnin' Utes, and the women's gymnastics team is known as Red Rocks.)	Salt Lake City, Utah
Utah State University	Aggies	Logan, Utah
Utah State University Eastern (USU Eastern)	Golden Eagles	Price, Utah
Utah Tech University	Trailblazers	St. George, Utah
Utah Valley University	Wolverines	Orem, Utah
Utica University	Pioneers	Utica, New York

== V ==
=== VA–VE ===
Institution	Nickname	Location
Valdosta State University	Blazers	Valdosta, Georgia
Valencia College	Pumas	Orlando, Florida
Valley City State University	Vikings	Valley City, North Dakota
Valley Forge Military Academy and College	Cadets	Wayne, Pennsylvania
Valor Christian College	Warriors	Columbus, Ohio
Valparaiso University	Beacons	Valparaiso, Indiana
Vance–Granville Community College	Vanguards	Henderson, North Carolina
Vanderbilt University	Commodores	Nashville, Tennessee
Vanguard University	Lions	Costa Mesa, California
Vassar College	Brewers	Poughkeepsie Town, New York
Vaughn College of Aeronautics and Technology	Warriors	East Elmhurst, New York
Ventura College	Pirates	Ventura, California
University of Vermont	Catamounts	Burlington, Vermont
Vermont State University	Spartans	Castleton, Vermont
Vermont State University	Badgers	Johnson, Vermont
Vermont State University	Hornets	Lyndon, Vermont
Vermont State University	Knights	Randolph, Vermont

=== VI–VO ===
Institution	Nickname	Location
Victor Valley College	Rams	Victorville, California
Villa Maria College	Vikings	Buffalo, New York
Villanova University	Wildcats	Villanova, Pennsylvania
Vincennes University	Trailblazers	Vincennes, Indiana
University of Virginia	Cavaliers	Charlottesville, Virginia
University of Virginia's College at Wise (UVA Wise)	Cavaliers	Wise, Virginia
Virginia Commonwealth University (VCU)	Rams	Richmond, Virginia
Virginia Highlands Community College	Wolves	Abingdon, Virginia
Virginia University of Lynchburg (VUL)	Dragons	Lynchburg, Virginia
Virginia Peninsula Community College	Gators	Williamsburg and Hampton, Virginia
Virginia State University	Trojans	Petersburg, Virginia
Virginia Tech	Hokies	Blacksburg, Virginia
Virginia Union University	Panthers	Richmond, Virginia
Viterbo University	V-Hawks	La Crosse, Wisconsin
Virginia Military Institute (VMI)	Keydets	Lexington, Virginia
Volunteer State Community College	Pioneers	Gallatin, Tennessee
Voorhees University	Tigers	Denmark, South Carolina

== W ==
=== WAB–WAR ===
Institution	Nickname	Location
Wabash College	Little Giants	Crawfordsville, Indiana
Wabash Valley College	Warriors	Mount Carmel, Illinois
Wagner College	Seahawks	Staten Island, New York
Wake Forest University	Demon Deacons	Winston-Salem, North Carolina
Wake Technical Community College	Eagles	Raleigh, North Carolina
Waldorf University	Warriors	Forest City, Iowa
Walla Walla Community College	Warriors	Walla Walla, Washington
Walla Walla University	Wolves	College Place, Washington
Wallace Community College	Governors	Dothan, Alabama
Wallace Community College Selma	Patriots	Selma, Alabama
Wallace State Community College	Lions	Hanceville, Alabama
Walsh University	Cavaliers	North Canton, Ohio
Warner University	Royals	Lake Wales, Florida
Warner Pacific University	Knights	Portland, Oregon
Warren County Community College	Golden Eagles	Washington, New Jersey
Warren Wilson College	Owls	Swannanoa, North Carolina
Wartburg College	Knights	Waverly, Iowa

=== WAS–WAY ===
Institution	Nickname	Location
Washburn University	Ichabods	Topeka, Kansas
University of Washington	Huskies	Seattle, Washington
Washington Adventist University	Shock	Takoma Park, Maryland
Washington College	Shoremen	Chestertown, Maryland
Washington County Community College	Golden Eagles	Calais, Maine
Washington & Jefferson College	Presidents	Washington, Pennsylvania
Washington and Lee University	Generals	Lexington, Virginia
Washington State College of Ohio	Bucks	Marietta, Ohio
Washington State University	Cougars	Pullman, Washington
Washington University in St. Louis (Washington University)	Bears	St. Louis, Missouri
Washtenaw Community College	Wolves	Ann Arbor Charter Township, Michigan
Waubonsee Community College	Chiefs	Various (Note: It has campuses in Sugar Grove; Aurora and Plano, Illinois.)
Wayland Baptist University	Pioneers	Plainview, Texas
Wayne Community College	Bison	Goldsboro, North Carolina
Wayne County Community College District	Wildcats	Detroit, Michigan
Wayne State College	Wildcats	Wayne, Nebraska
Wayne State University	Warriors	Detroit, Michigan
Waynesburg University	Yellow Jackets	Waynesburg, Pennsylvania

=== WEA–WES ===
Institution	Nickname	Location
Weatherford College	Coyotes	Weatherford, Texas
Webber International University	Warriors	Babson Park, Florida
Weber State University	Wildcats	Ogden, Utah
Webster University	Gorloks	Webster Groves, Missouri
Welch College	Flames	Gallatin, Tennessee
Wellesley College	Blue	Wellesley, Massachusetts
Wenatchee Valley College	Knights	Wenatchee, Washington
Wentworth Institute of Technology	Leopards	Boston, Massachusetts
Wesleyan College	Wolves	Macon, Georgia
Wesleyan University	Cardinals	Middletown, Connecticut

=== WEST–WESTC ===
Institution	Nickname	Location
University of West Alabama	Tigers	Livingston, Alabama
West Chester University	Golden Rams	West Chester, Pennsylvania
West Coast Baptist College	Eagles	Lancaster, California
University of West Florida	Argonauts	Pensacola, Florida
University of West Georgia	Wolves	Carrollton, Georgia
West Georgia Technical College	Golden Knights	Waco, Georgia
West Liberty University	Hilltoppers	West Liberty, West Virginia
West Los Angeles College	Wildcats	Culver City, California
West Shore Community College	Foxes	Scottville, Michigan
West Texas A&M University	Buffaloes	Canyon, Texas
West Valley College	Vikings	Saratoga, California
West Virginia University	Mountaineers	Morgantown, West Virginia
West Virginia University at Parkersburg	Riverhawks	Parkersburg, West Virginia
West Virginia Northern Community College	Thundering Chickens	Wheeling, West Virginia
West Virginia State University	Yellow Jackets	Institute, West Virginia
West Virginia University Institute of Technology	Golden Bears	Beckley, West Virginia
West Virginia Wesleyan College	Bobcats	Buckhannon, West Virginia
Westchester Community College	Vikings	Valhalla, New York
Westcliff University	Warriors	Irvine, California

=== WESTERN ===
Institution	Nickname	Location
Western Carolina University	Catamounts	Cullowhee, North Carolina
Western Colorado University	Mountaineers	Gunnison, Colorado
Western Connecticut State University	Wolves	Danbury, Connecticut
College of Western Idaho	Otters	Nampa, Idaho
Western Illinois University	Leathernecks	Macomb, Illinois
Western Kentucky University	Hilltoppers and Lady Toppers	Bowling Green, Kentucky
Western Michigan University	Broncos	Kalamazoo, Michigan
Western Governors University	Night Owls	Millcreek, Utah
Western Nebraska Community College	Cougars	Scottsbluff, Nebraska
Western New England University	Golden Bears	Springfield, Massachusetts
Western New Mexico University	Mustangs	Silver City, New Mexico
Western Nevada College	Wildcats	Carson City, Nevada
Western Oklahoma State College	Pioneers	Altus, Oklahoma
Western Oregon University	Wolves	Monmouth, Oregon
Western Piedmont Community College	Pioneers	Morganton, North Carolina
Western Technical College	Cavaliers	La Crosse, Wisconsin
Western Texas College	Westerners and Lady Westerners	Snyder, Texas
Western Washington University	Vikings	Bellingham, Washington
Western Wyoming Community College	Mustangs	Rock Springs, Wyoming

=== WESTF–WH ===
Institution	Nickname	Location
Westfield State University	Owls	Westfield, Massachusetts
Westminster College	Blue Jays	Fulton, Missouri
Westminster College	Titans	New Wilmington, Pennsylvania
Westminster University	Griffins	Salt Lake City, Utah
Westmont College	Warriors	Montecito, California
Westmoreland County Community College	Wolfpack	Youngwood, Pennsylvania
Wharton County Junior College	Pioneers	Wharton, Texas
Whatcom Community College	Orcas	Bellingham, Washington
Wheaton College	Thunder	Wheaton, Illinois
Wheaton College	Lyons	Norton, Massachusetts
Wheeling University	Cardinals	Wheeling, West Virginia
White Mountains Community College	Golden Eagles	Berlin, New Hampshire
Whitman College	Blues	Walla Walla, Washington
Whittier College	Poets	Whittier, California
Whitworth University	Pirates	Spokane, Washington

=== WIC–WIN ===
Institution	Nickname	Location
Wichita State University	Shockers	Wichita, Kansas
Widener University	Pride	Chester, Pennsylvania
Wilberforce University	Bulldogs	Wilberforce, Ohio
Wilbur Wright College	Rams	Chicago, Illinois
Wiley University	Wildcats	Marshall, Texas
Wilkes Community College	Cougars	Wilkesboro, North Carolina
Wilkes University	Colonels	Wilkes-Barre, Pennsylvania
Willamette University	Bearcats	Salem, Oregon
College of William & Mary	Tribe	Williamsburg, Virginia
William Carey University	Crusaders	Hattiesburg, Mississippi
William Jewell College	Cardinals	Liberty, Missouri
William Paterson University	Pioneers	Wayne, New Jersey
William Peace University	Pacers	Raleigh, North Carolina
William Penn University	Statesmen	Oskaloosa, Iowa
William Woods University	Owls	Fulton, Missouri
Williams College	Ephs	Williamstown, Massachusetts
Williams Baptist University	Eagles	Walnut Ridge, Arkansas
Williamson College	Jaguars	Franklin, Tennessee
Williamson College of the Trades	Mechanics	Media, Pennsylvania
Williamsburg Technical College	Brewers	Kingstree, South Carolina
Williston State College	Tetons	Williston, North Dakota
Wilmington College	Quakers	Wilmington, Ohio
Wilmington University	Wildcats	New Castle, Delaware
Wilson College	Phoenix	Chambersburg, Pennsylvania
Wingate University	Bulldogs	Wingate, North Carolina
Winona State University	Warriors	Winona, Minnesota
Winston-Salem State University	Rams	Winston-Salem, North Carolina
Winthrop University	Eagles	Rock Hill, South Carolina

=== WIS–WIT ===
Institution	Nickname	Location
University of Wisconsin–Madison (Wisconsin)	Badgers	Madison, Wisconsin
University of Wisconsin–Eau Claire (Note: The athletics are mainly branded as Wisconsin–Eau Claire, but they are also known as UW–Eau Claire or simply Eau Claire.)	Blugolds	Eau Claire, Wisconsin
University of Wisconsin–Green Bay (Green Bay) (Note: The athletics are mainly branded as Green Bay, but they are also known as Wisconsin–Green Bay, UW–Green Bay or UWGB.)	Phoenix	Green Bay, Wisconsin
University of Wisconsin–Green Bay, Sheboygan Campus (Note: The athletics are mainly branded as Sheboygan, but they are also known as UWGB–Sheboygan.)	Wombats	Sheboygan, Wisconsin
University of Wisconsin–La Crosse (Note: The athletics are mainly branded as Wisconsin–La Crosse, but they are also known as UW–La Crosse.)	Eagles	La Crosse, Wisconsin
University of Wisconsin–Milwaukee (Milwaukee) (Note: The athletics are mainly branded as Milwaukee, but they are also known as Wisconsin–Milwaukee or UW–Milwaukee.)	Panthers	Milwaukee, Wisconsin
University of Wisconsin–Oshkosh (Note: The athletics are mainly branded as Wisconsin–Oshkosh, but they are also known as UW–Oshkosh.)	Titans	Oshkosh, Wisconsin
University of Wisconsin–Oshkosh, Fox Cities Campus (Note: The athletics are branded as UWO–Fox Cities.)	Cyclones	Menasha, Wisconsin
University of Wisconsin–Parkside (Parkside) (Note: The athletics are mainly branded as Parkside, but they are also known as Wisconsin–Parkside or UW–Parkside.)	Rangers	Somers, Wisconsin
University of Wisconsin–Platteville (Note: The athletics are mainly branded as Wisconsin–Platteville, but they are also known as UW–Platteville.)	Pioneers	Platteville, Wisconsin
University of Wisconsin–Platteville Baraboo Sauk County (Note: The athletics are mainly branded as Wisconsin–Baraboo, but they are also known as UW–Baraboo.)	Fighting Spirits	Baraboo, Wisconsin
University of Wisconsin–River Falls (Note: The athletics are mainly branded as Wisconsin–River Falls, but they are also known as UW–River Falls.)	Falcons	River Falls, Wisconsin
University of Wisconsin–Stevens Point (Note: The athletics are mainly branded as Wisconsin–Stevens Point, but they are also known as UW–Stevens Point.)	Pointers	Stevens Point, Wisconsin
University of Wisconsin–Stevens Point at Marshfield (Note: The athletics are mainly branded as Marshfield, but they are also known as UWSP–Marshfield.)	Marauders	Marshfield, Wisconsin
University of Wisconsin–Stevens Point at Wausau (Note: The athletics are mainly branded as Wausau, but they are also known as UWSP–Wausau.)	Huskies	Wausau, Wisconsin
University of Wisconsin–Stout (Note: The athletics are mainly branded as Wisconsin–Stout, but they are also known as UW–Stout.)	Blue Devils	Menomonie, Wisconsin
University of Wisconsin–Superior (Note: The athletics are mainly branded as Wisconsin–Superior, but they are also known as UW–Superior.)	Yellowjackets	Superior, Wisconsin
University of Wisconsin–Whitewater (Note: The athletics are mainly branded as Wisconsin–Whitewater, but they are also known as UW–Whitewater or simply Whitewater.)	Warhawks	Whitewater, Wisconsin
University of Wisconsin–Whitewater at Rock County (Note: The athletics are mainly branded as Rock County, but they are also known as UWW–Rock County.)	Rattlers	Janesville, Wisconsin
Wisconsin Lutheran College	Warriors	Milwaukee, Wisconsin
Wittenberg University	Tigers	Springfield, Ohio

=== WO–WY ===
Institution	Nickname	Location
Wofford College	Terriers	Spartanburg, South Carolina
Woodland Community College	Eagles	Woodland, California
College of Wooster	Fighting Scots	Wooster, Ohio
Wor–Wic Community College	Dolphins	Salisbury, Maryland
Worcester Polytechnic Institute (WPI)	Engineers	Worcester, Massachusetts
Worcester State University	Lancers	Worcester, Massachusetts
Wright State University	Raiders	Fairborn, Ohio
University of Wyoming	Cowboys and Cowgirls	Laramie, Wyoming

== X ==
Institution	Nickname	Location
Xavier University	Musketeers	Cincinnati, Ohio
Xavier University of Louisiana	Gold Rush and Gold Nuggets	New Orleans, Louisiana

== Y ==
Institution	Nickname	Location
Yakima Valley College	Yaks	Yakima, Washington
Yale University	Bulldogs	New Haven, Connecticut
Yavapai College	Roughriders	Prescott, Arizona
Yeshiva University	Maccabees	New York City, New York
York College, City University of New York	Cardinal	New York City, New York
York College of Pennsylvania	Spartans	Spring Garden Township, Pennsylvania
York County Community College	Hawks	Wells, Maine
York University	Panthers	York, Nebraska
Young Harris College	Mountain Lions	Young Harris, Georgia
Youngstown State University	Penguins	Youngstown, Ohio
Yuba College	49ers	Linda, California

== Z ==
Institution	Nickname	Location
Zane State College	Tigers	Zanesville, Ohio

== See also ==
- List of U.S. college mascots
- List of college nickname changes in the United States
