= List of college athletic programs in Kansas =

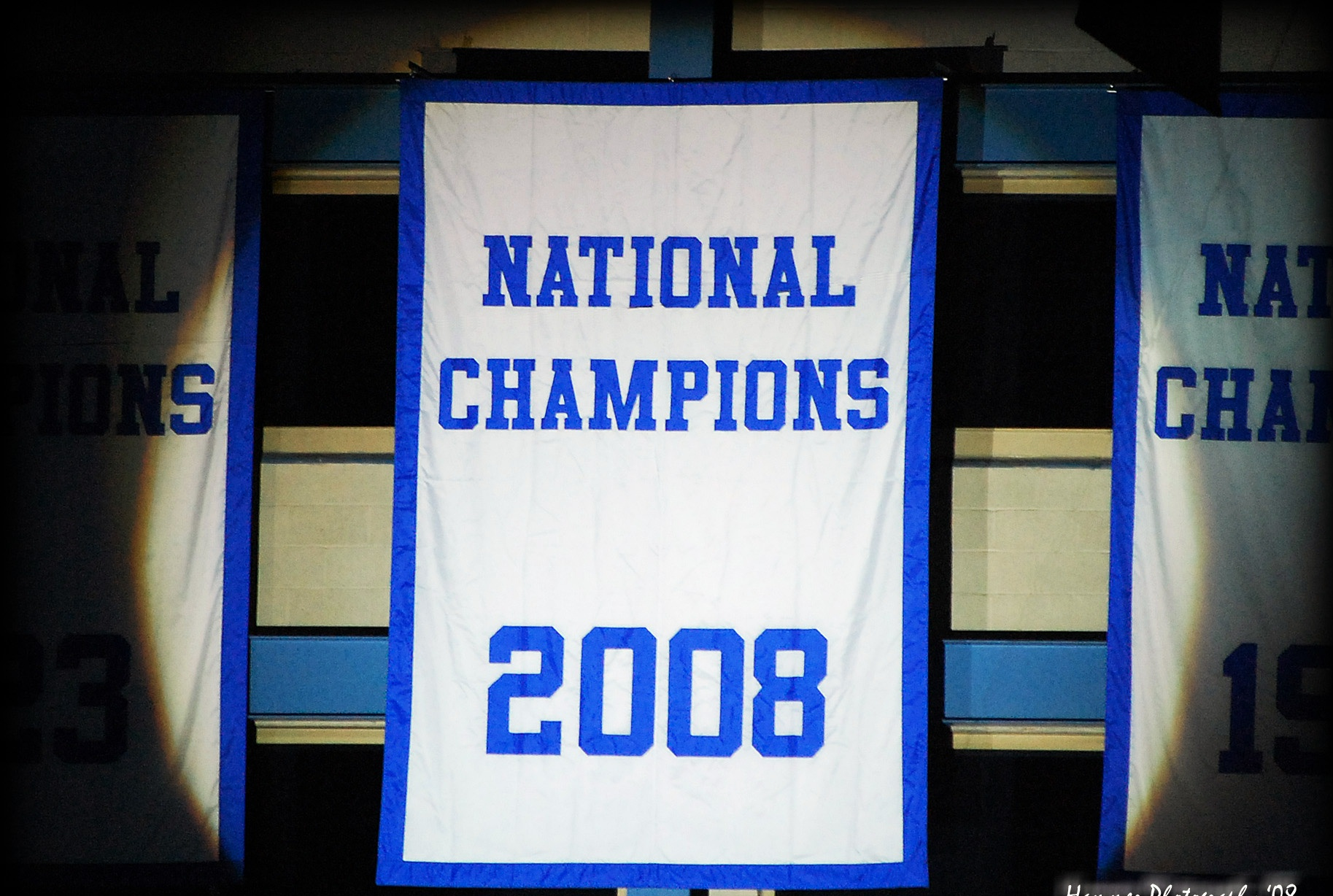
The Kansas Jayhawks men's basketball team has won six national championships, most recently in 2022.

This is a list of college athletic programs in the U.S. state of Kansas.

== NCAA ==
=== Division I ===
Full NCAA Division I member colleges in Kansas.
– FBS Football, – Non-Football

Team	School	City	Conference	Sport sponsorship								
Team	School	City	Conference	Foot- ball	Basketball		Base- ball	Soft- ball	Ice Hockey		Soccer	
Team	School	City	Conference	Foot- ball	M	W	Base- ball	Soft- ball	M	W	M	W
Kansas Jayhawks	University of Kansas	Lawrence	Big 12	FBS	Yes	Yes	Yes	Yes	No	No	No	Yes
Kansas State Wildcats	Kansas State University	Manhattan	Big 12	FBS	Yes	Yes	Yes	No	No	No	No	Yes
Wichita State Shockers	Wichita State University	Wichita	The American	No	Yes	Yes	Yes	Yes	No	No	No	No

=== Division II ===
Full NCAA Division II member colleges in Kansas.
– Football member, – Non-football member

Team	School	City	Conference	Sport sponsorship								
Team	School	City	Conference	Foot- ball	Basketball		Base- ball	Soft- ball	Ice Hockey		Soccer	
Team	School	City	Conference	Foot- ball	M	W	Base- ball	Soft- ball	M	W	M	W
Emporia State Hornets & Lady Hornets	Emporia State University	Emporia	MIAA	Yes	Yes	Yes	Yes	Yes	No	No	No	Yes
Fort Hays State Tigers	Fort Hays State University	Hays	MIAA	Yes	Yes	Yes	Yes	Yes	No	No	Yes (Note: Fort Hays State and Newman's men's soccer teams compete in the Great American Conference.)	Yes
Newman Jets	Newman University	Wichita	MIAA	No	Yes	Yes	Yes	Yes	No	No	Yes	Yes
Pittsburg State Gorillas	Pittsburg State University	Pittsburg	MIAA	Yes	Yes	Yes	Yes	Yes	No	No	No	No
Washburn Ichabods	Washburn University	Topeka	MIAA	Yes	Yes	Yes	Yes	Yes	No	No	No	Yes

== NAIA ==
Full NAIA member colleges in Kansas.
– Football member, – Non-football member

Team	School	City	Conference	Sport sponsorship						
Team	School	City	Conference	Foot- ball	Basketball		Base- ball	Soft- ball	Soccer	
Team	School	City	Conference	Foot- ball	M	W	Base- ball	Soft- ball	M	W
Baker Wildcats	Baker University	Baldwin City	Heart of America	Yes (Note: Baker, Bethel, Ottawa, Kansas Wesleyan, Southwestern, & St. Mary's additionally sponsor flag football as a women's varsity sport.)	Yes	Yes	Yes	Yes	Yes	Yes
Benedictine Ravens	Benedictine College	Atchison	Heart of America	Yes	Yes	Yes	Yes	Yes	Yes	Yes
Bethany Swedes	Bethany College	Lindsborg	Kansas	Yes	Yes	Yes	Yes	Yes	Yes	Yes
Bethel Threshers	Bethel College	North Newton	Kansas	Yes	Yes	Yes	No	Yes	Yes	Yes
Central Christian Tigers	Central Christian College of Kansas	McPherson	Sooner	No	Yes	Yes	Yes	Yes	Yes	Yes
Friends Falcons	Friends University	Wichita	Kansas	Yes	Yes	Yes	Yes	Yes	Yes	Yes
Haskell Indian Nations Fighting Indians	Haskell Indian Nations University	Lawrence	Continental	No	Yes	Yes	No	Yes	No	No
Hesston Larks	Hesston College	Hesston	Continental	No	Yes	Yes	Yes	Yes	Yes	Yes
Kansas Wesleyan Coyotes	Kansas Wesleyan University	Salina	Kansas	Yes	Yes	Yes	Yes	Yes	Yes	Yes
McPherson Bulldogs	McPherson College	McPherson	Kansas	Yes	Yes	Yes	Yes	Yes	Yes	Yes
MidAmerica Nazarene Pioneers	MidAmerica Nazarene University	Olathe	Heart of America	Yes	Yes	Yes	Yes	Yes	Yes	Yes
Ottawa Braves	Ottawa University	Ottawa	Kansas	Yes	Yes	Yes	Yes	Yes	Yes	Yes
Saint Mary Spires	University of Saint Mary	Leavenworth	Kansas	Yes	Yes	Yes	Yes	Yes	Yes	Yes
Southwestern Moundbuilders	Southwestern College	Winfield	Kansas	Yes	Yes	Yes	Yes	Yes	Yes	Yes
Sterling Warriors	Sterling College	Sterling	Kansas	Yes	Yes	Yes	Yes	Yes	Yes	Yes
Tabor Bluejays	Tabor College	Hillsboro	Kansas	Yes	Yes	Yes	Yes	Yes	Yes	Yes

== NJCAA ==
Full NJCAA member colleges in Kansas.
– Football member, – Non-football member

Team	School	City	Conference
Allen Red Devils	Allen Community College	Iola	Kansas Jayhawk
Barton Cougars	Barton Community College	Great Bend	Kansas Jayhawk
Butler Grizzlies	Butler Community College	El Dorado	Kansas Jayhawk
Cloud County Thunderbirds	Cloud County Community College	Concordia	Kansas Jayhawk
Coffeyville Red Ravens	Coffeyville Community College	Coffeyville	Kansas Jayhawk
Colby Trojans	Colby Community College	Colby	Kansas Jayhawk
Cowley Tigers	Cowley County Community College	Arkansas City	Kansas Jayhawk
Dodge City Conquistadors	Dodge City Community College	Dodge City	Kansas Jayhawk
Fort Scott Greyhounds	Fort Scott Community College	Fort Scott	Kansas Jayhawk
Garden City Broncbusters	Garden City Community College	Garden City	Kansas Jayhawk
Highland Scotties	Highland Community College	Highland	Kansas Jayhawk
Hutchinson Blue Dragons	Hutchinson Community College	Hutchinson	Kansas Jayhawk
Independence Pirates	Independence Community College	Independence	Kansas Jayhawk
Johnson County Cavaliers	Johnson County Community College	Overland Park	Kansas Jayhawk
Kansas City Kansas Blue Devils	Kansas City Kansas Community College	Kansas City	Kansas Jayhawk
Labette Cardinals	Labette Community College	Parsons	Kansas Jayhawk
Neosho County Panthers	Neosho County Community College	Chanute	Kansas Jayhawk
Northwest Tech Mavericks	Fort Hays Tech Northwest	Goodland	Kansas Jayhawk
Pratt Beavers	Pratt Community College	Pratt	Kansas Jayhawk
Seward County Saints	Seward County Community College	Liberal	Kansas Jayhawk

== NCCAA ==
NCCAA member colleges in Kansas.
– NCCAA member

Team	School	City	Conference
Barclay Bears	Barclay College	Haviland	Midwest Christian
Hesston Larks	Hesston College	Hesston	Independent
Manhattan Christian Thunder	Manhattan Christian College	Manhattan	Midwest Christian
Kansas Christian Falcons	Kansas Christian College	Overland Park	Independent

== See also ==
- List of NCAA Division I institutions
- List of NCAA Division II institutions
- List of NCAA Division III institutions
- List of NAIA institutions
- List of USCAA institutions
- List of NCCAA institutions
- List of NJCAA Division I institutions
- List of NJCAA Division II institutions
- List of NJCAA Division III institutions
