= Rand Chappell =

American college basketball coach (born 1963)

Current position
- Title: Head coach
- Team: Johnson County
- Conference: KJCCC
- Record: 188-68

Biographical details
- Born: April 4, 1963 (age 63); Springfield, Missouri, U.S.

Coaching career (HC unless noted)
- 1988–1993: Southwest Baptist (assistant)
- 1993–1995: Labette
- 1995–1998: Phillips
- 1998–2003: Henderson State
- 2003–2010: Central Arkansas
- 2012–2013: Garden City
- 2013–2020: Eastern Illinois (assistant)
- 2020–present: Johnson County

Head coaching record
- Overall: 302–166 (college); 188-68 (junior college)

Accomplishments and honors

Awards
- Sooner Athletic Conference / Oklahoma Media Association Coach of the Year (1996); SAC Coach of the Year (1998); Basketball Times National Coach of the Year (1998)

Rand Chappell (born April 4, 1963) is an American college basketball coach. He is the head coach at Johnson County Community College. Chappell has marked a career head coaching record of 402-213, led six teams to the NCAA Division II National Tournaments, and won more than 20 games in each season for 12 consecutive years.

== Early career ==
Chappell played for Charlie Spoonhour at Southwest Missouri State University and began his coaching career as a graduate assistant at the University of Mississippi and Missouri State University. Chappell spent three seasons (1989–1993) as an assistant coach at Southwest Baptist University under head coach Jerry Kirksey where he helped guide the 1990–91 team to the NCAA Division II Elite Eight.

Chappell began his head coaching career in 1993 when he was hired as head coach at Labette Community College in Parsons, Kansas. In his two seasons at Labette, Chappell posted a 45–17 record, led the Redbirds to consecutive Independent Tournament Championships, and reached the NJCAA Region VI Tournament both seasons.

In 1995 Chappell was hired as head coach of Phillips University in Enid, Oklahoma, and took over a program that had had three straight losing seasons. During his three years at Phillips he guided the Haymakers to the No. 1 ranking in the final NAIA Division I regular season poll, compiled a 78–22 record, and led the team to two NAIA tournament appearances. He was twice named Sooner Athletic Conference Coach of the year and was named the Basketball Times National Coach of the Year in 1998.

== Henderson State ==
Chappell served as the head basketball coach at Henderson State University from 1999 to 2003. During his five seasons at Henderson State, he guided his teams to an unprecedented four Gulf South Conference men's basketball tournament championships, three Gulf South Conference West titles, and led the team to five NCAA tournament appearances. He compiled a 120–40 overall record and a 58–14 mark in Gulf South Conference games. He was named the NABC South Region Coach of the Year in 1999.

In 2002–03, Henderson State was 30–5 overall, tying a school record, and reached the NCAA D-II Tournament South Regional championship game. The Reddies were ranked 15th in the nation in the final NABC/Division II Bulletin Top 25.

== Central Arkansas ==
Chappell took over the University of Central Arkansas program (2003) that went 5–20 the previous year and produced a 43–18 record in his first two seasons as the head coach of the Bears. Central Arkansas tied for the league title and made their first ever trip to the NCAA II Tournament. They started the 2004 season with 11 straight victories and captured their first-ever national ranking. He led the Bears to two straight appearances in the GSC Tournament, advancing to the semifinals both years.

In 2006 Central Arkansas began its multi-year transition to Division I and joined the Southland Conference. The team was not eligible for post-season competition until the 2010 season. On March 5, 2010, Chappell was let go by Central Arkansas after seven seasons and posting a 104–104 record.

At the end of his D-II career (2005), Chappell’s overall coaching record was 243–79, which ranked him in the top five on the NCAA D-II list with a .761 winning percentage. He also had the all-time highest winning percentage in Gulf South Conference history with .750 percent.

== Eastern Illinois University ==
At EIU, Chappell coached 11 All-Ohio Valley Conference performers, including three first-team and five All-Newcomer team selections, and four NABC All-District selections. He also helped the Panthers to six OVC Tournament appearances in seven seasons.

== Johnson County Community College ==
Rand Chappell is in his sixth season as head coach at Johnson County Community College, and his 24th overall as a collegiate head coach in 2025-26.

Chappell has amassed 132 wins in his first five seasons, the most of any of the previous five coaches in program history. He stands 132-31, good for an .810 winning percentage. For his career, he has amassed a 188-68 (.734) record over eight seasons coaching at the NJCAA level and is 490-234 (.677) over his 23-year college coaching career.

Chappell's tenure at JCCC boasts five straight winning seasons and four consecutive 20-win campaigns, four NJCAA D-II Tournament appearances (2021, 2023, 2024, 2025), three Region VI/Plains District titles (2021, 2023, 2024) and three KJCCC D-II tiles, two outright (2021, 2023, 2025). His teams have been ranked nationally in 62-of-74 polls (84%), including a span of 32-straight from January 19, 2021 to November 28, 2022.

== Personal ==
A native of Springfield, Missouri, Chappell graduated from Glendale High School. He received both his bachelor's degree in finance and Master of Business Administration degree from Missouri State University. He is married to Molly Chappell and has two daughters—Lauren and Paige.

== Head coaching record ==
=== College ===
Record table
Season	Team	Overall	Conference	Standing	Postseason
Phillips Haymakers (Sooner Athletic Conference) (1995–1998)
1995–96	Phillips	23–10	–		
1996–97	Phillips	23–9	–		NAIA first round
1997–98	Phillips	32–3	–		NAIA second round
Phillips:		78–22 (.780)			
Henderson State Reddies (Gulf South Conference) (1998–2003)
1998–99	Henderson State	24–8	11–1	1st (West)	NCAA D-II Sweet Sixteen
1999–2000	Henderson State	23–10	9–3	2nd (West)	NCAA D-II first round
2000–01	Henderson State	22–10	11–5	T–2nd (West)	NCAA D-II Sweet Sixteen
2001–02	Henderson State	21–7	13–3	1st (West)	NCAA D-II second round
2002–03	Henderson State	30–5	14–2	1st (West)	NCAA D-II Sweet Sixteen
Henderson State:		120–40 (.750)	55–14 (.797)		
Central Arkansas Bears (Gulf South Conference) (2003–2006)
2003–04	Central Arkansas	20–10	9–7	5th (West)	
2004–05	Central Arkansas	23–8	11–5	T–1st (West)	NCAA D-II second round
2005–06	Central Arkansas	18–10	10–6	T–3rd (West)	
Central Arkansas Bears (Southland Conference) (2006–2010)
2006–07	Central Arkansas	10–20	4–12	6th (East)	
2007–08	Central Arkansas	14–16	4–12	6th (East)	
2008–09	Central Arkansas	10–19	3–13	6th (East)	
2009–10	Central Arkansas	9–21	3–13	6th (East)	
Central Arkansas:		104–104 (.500)	44–68 (.393)		
Johnson County Community College Cavaliers (Kansas Jayhawk Community College Conference) (2020–2025)
2020-21	JCCC	16-6	5-3		NJCAA D-II Tournament
2021-22	JCCC	28-4	11-3		No. 4 in final NJCAA Poll
2022-23	JCCC	29-8	11-3		NJCAA D-II Tournament
2023-24	JCCC	28-7	11-3		NJCAA D-II Tournament
2024-25	JCCC	31-6	14-0		NJCAA D-II Tournament
Johnson County Community College:		132–31 (.810)	52–12 (.813)		
Total:		434–197 (.688)			
National champion Postseason invitational champion Conference regular season champion Conference regular season and conference tournament champion Division regular season champion Division regular season and conference tournament champion Conference tournament champion
