= NJCAA Men's Division I Cross Country Championship =

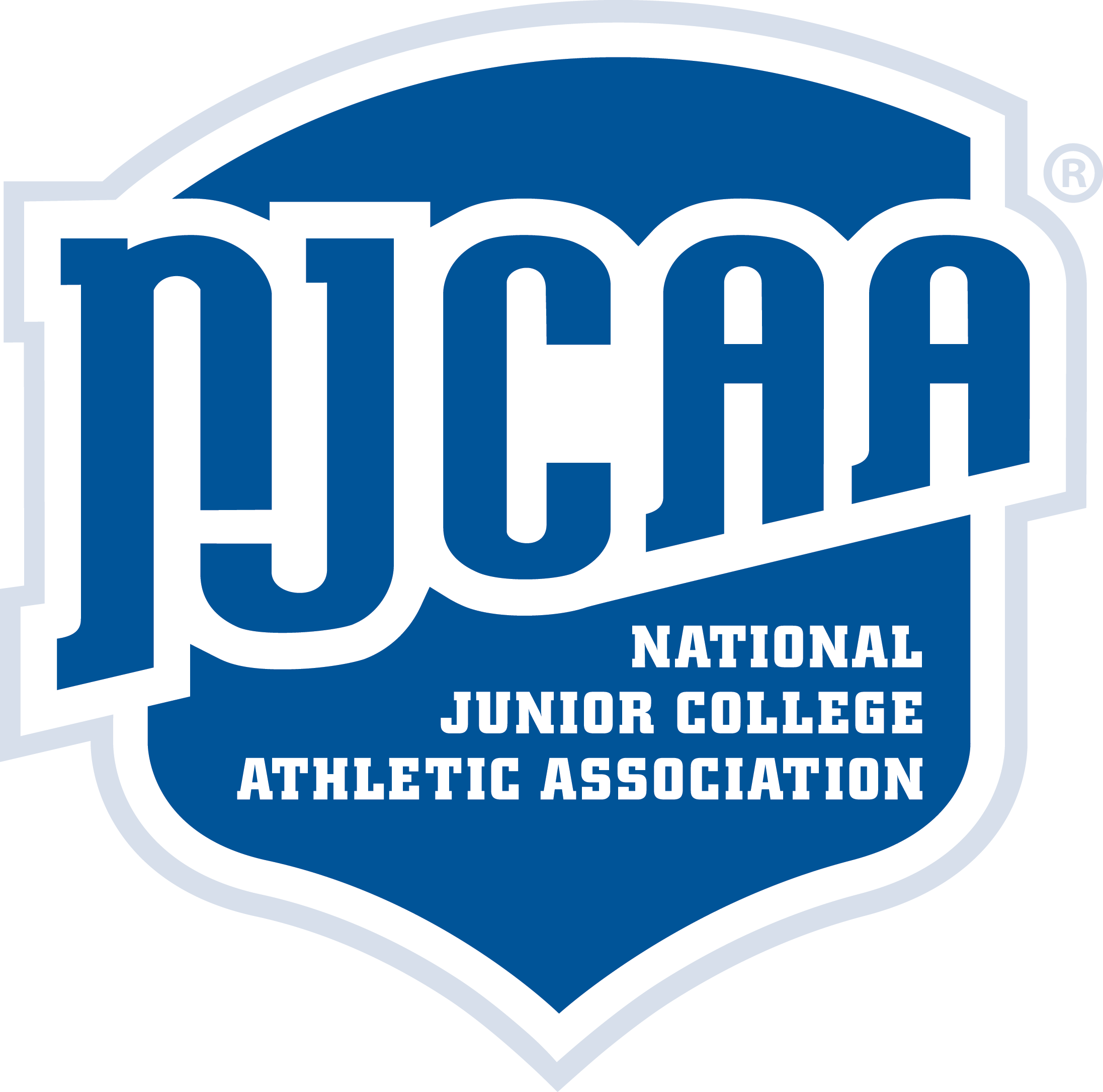
- Sport: College cross country running
- First season: 1959; 67 years ago
- No. of teams: Varies
- Most recent champion: Salt Lake
- Most titles: Team: Iowa Central (6); Individual: Hutchinson (1)
- Website: njcaa.org/xc

Each autumn since 1958, the National Junior College Athletic Association (NJCAA) has hosted men's cross country championships. Since 1991, the NJCAA has had three separate division championships. Teams and individual runners qualify for the championship at regional competitions approximately a week before the national championships, typically held in November.

== Qualifying ==
The NJCAA splits the country into 24 regions. Of those regions, 15 host regional meets. In order to qualify to participate in the national championships a team must participate in their region championship, if the region holds a championship. If the region does not hold a championship, the teams in the region qualify by default. There are no minimum performance standards to participate in the national championship.

== Champions ==
- Prior to 1991, only a single national championship was held between all members of the NJCAA; Division II existed from 1991 to 2003 and 2020-present and Division III started in 1991.

NCAA Men's Division I Cross Country Championship
Year	Host city (Host Team)	Team Championship				Individual Championship	
Year	Host city (Host Team)	Winner	Points	Runner-up	Points	Winner (Team)	Time
1959	Alfred, NY (Alfred State)	Cobleskill A&T	15	Alfred	74	Tom Farry (Cobleskill A&T)	?
1960	Jackson, MI (Jackson / Spring Arbor)	Coffeyville	?	?	?	Mike Fulgham (Coffeyville)	?
1961	Bronx, NY (New York City)	Flint	75	Orange County	83	Rick Vehlow (New York City)	15:39.9
1962	Jackson, MI (Jackson / Spring Arbor)	SUNY Coblekill	56	Spring Arbor	92	Tony Milfsurd (Spring Arbor)	16:06.8
1963	Buffalo, NY (Erie County Tech)	Muskegon County	53	Grand Rapids	79	Roger Plont (Muskegon)	16:56
1964	Jackson, MI (Jackson / Spring Arbor)	Muskegon County	82	Nassau	88	Eugene Cote (SUNY Farmingdale)	15:28
1965	Jackson, MI (Jackson / Spring Arbor)	Ricks	55	Haskell Indian Nations	101	Roy Old Person (Haskell Indian Nations)	15:02.1
1966	Pensacola, FL (Pensacola State)	Ricks	47	Glendale	78	Scott Giddings (Glendale)	14:52
1967	Farmingdale, NY (SUNY Farmingdale)	Glendale	64	Brevard	65	Bob Gray (Brevard)	15:26.4
1968	Lawrence, KS (Haskell Indian Nations)	SUNY Cobleskill	101	Haskell Indian Nations	124	Bob Gray (Brevard)	15:06
1969	Butler, PA (Butler)	Vincennes	115	Glendale	116	Jan McNeale (Lane)	24:14
1970	Vincennes, ID (Vincennes)	Butler	121	Allegheny County	137	Reginald McAfee (Brevard)	20:30.1
1971	Danville, IL (Danville Area)	Vincennes	86	Allegheny County	97	Herb Gibson (Alleghany County)	19:40.4
1972	Pensacola, FL (Pensacola State)	Lane	85	Glendale	98	Fred Carnahan (Central)	20:06
1973	Tallahassee, FL (Florida)	Allegheny County / Southwestern Michigan	72	-	-	John Roscoe (Southwestern Michigan)	18:41.5
1974	Eugene, OR (Lane)	Southwestern Michigan	44	Golden Valley Lutheran	119	Jeff Jirele (Golden Valley Lutheran)	24:32.3
Championship courses mandated to be either 8 km or 5 miles
1975	Rochester, MN (Rochester)	Southwestern Michigan	39	Central Arizona	62	Jo Ofsansky (Southwestern Michigan)	24:26.4
1976	Farmingdale, NY (SUNY Farmingdale)	Allegheny County	18	Pima	118	Robin Holland (Alleghany County)	23:26.4
1977	Tucson, AZ (Pima)	Allegheny County	21	Southwestern Michigan	72	Malcolm East (Alleghany County)	23:30.2
1978	Champaign, IL (Parkland College)	Southwestern Michigan	59	Hagerstown	71	Otis Sanders (Hagerstown)	24:12
1979	Wichita, KS (Butler)	New Mexico	105	Southwestern Michigan	131	Pedro Flores (New Mexico)	24:20.9
1980	Coeur d'Alene, ID (Coeur d'Alene)	Pima	62	Brevard	86	Adrian Royle (Southern Idaho)	24:23.1
1981	Wichita, KS (Butler)	Southwestern Michigan	64	Brevard	104	Kurt Bussell (Southwestern Michigan)	24:24.1
1982	Utica, NY (Mohawk Valley)	Brevard	57	Clackamus	68	Agapius Masong-Amo (Ranger)	25:06.4
1983	Hutchinson, KS (Hutchinson)	Brevard	65	Southwestern Michigan	94	Alphonce Swai (Brevard)	24:30.08
1984	Twin Falls, ID (Southern Idaho)	Brevard	86	Alfred State	98	David O'Hara (Ricks)	26:28.06
1985	Schaumburg, IL (Harper)	Brevard	67	Central Arizona	102	Leo Martin (South Plains)	24:43
1986	Alfred, NY (Alfred State)	Barton	62	Brevard	65	Mark Roberts (Central Arizona)	24:19
1987	Overland Park, KS (Johnson County)	Brevard	43	Blinn	58	Mark Roberts (Central Arizona)	23:50
1988	Twin Falls, ID (Southern Idaho)	Central Arizona	56	Central Oregon	67	Mbarak Hussein (South Plains)	25:14.8
1989	Overland Park, KS (Johnson County)	Central Oregon	38	Central Arizona	62	Micah Boinett (Blinn)	24:19
1990	? (?)	Brevard	53	Blinn	107	Phillimon Hanneck (South Plains)	24:44.7
Championship switches to a 3 division system
1991	Wichita, KS (Butler)	South Plains	45	Central Oregon	68	Phillimon Hanneck (South Plains)	25:19.45
1992	Tempe, AZ (?)	Central Oregon	46	South Plains	55	Richard Kosgei (Barton)	23:57
1993	Tempe, AZ (?)	Blinn	45	Central Oregon	58	Richard Kosgei (Barton)	25:54
1994	Alfred, NY (Alfred State)	Blinn	43	South Plains	75	Godfrey Siamusiye (Blinn)	26:10.8
1995	Alfred, NY (Alfred State)	Butler	41	South Plains	74	Julius Wanjiru (Meridian)	26:00.8
1996	Overland Park, KS (Johnson County)	South Plains	43	Butler	46	Julius Wanjiru (Butler)	24:12.58
1997	Levelland, TX (South Plains)	South Plains	50	Diné	72	Salem Messaoui (South Plains)	24:41.5
1998	Overland Park, KS (Johnson County)	Dodge City	27	South Plains	64	Eliud Njubi (Dodge City)	24:18
1999	Lansing, MI (Lansing)	Ricks	53	South Plains	85	Eliud Njubi (Dodge City)	24:17.9
2000	Levelland, TX (South Plains)	Ricks	42	Central Arizona	69	Jeff Davidson (Ricks)	25:53.1
2001	Lansing, MI (Lansing)	Ricks	67	Central Arizona	71	Simon Ngata (Butler)	24:45
2002	Levelland, TX (South Plains)	Central Arizona	48	Utah Valley State	78	Simon Ngata (Butler)	25:35.2
2003	Lawrence, KS (Haskell Indian Nations)	Central Arizona	39	Butler	40	Obed Mutanya (Central Arizona)	25:11.3
2004	El Paso, TX (El Paso)	Paradise Valley	65	Central Arizona	75	Obed Mutanya (Central Arizona)	23:41.15
2005	Lawrence, KS (Haskell Indian Nations)	Central Arizona	100	Iowa Central	104	Joseph Simuchimba (Central Arizona)	24:32
2006	El Paso, TX (El Paso)	Rend Lake	64	Central Arizona	74	Tyson David (Central Arizona)	22:36
2007	Ina, IL (Rend Lake)	Lansing	111	Iowa Central	120	Ben Cheruiyot (Rend Lake)	23:28.64
2008	Spartanburg, SC (Spartanburg Methodist)	Paradise Valley	97	South Plains	109	Stephen Sambu (Rend Lake)	23:54
2009	Peoria, IL (Illinois Central)	Rend Lake	66	Paradise Valley	68	Stephen Sambu (Rend Lake)	24:00
2010	Spartanburg, SC (Spartanburg Methodist)	Cowley	94	Central Arizona	110	Henry Leilei (Central Arizona)	23:39
2011	Hobbs, NM (New Mexico)	Paradise Valley	54	Garden City	113	Kemoy Campell (South Plains)	25:22.08
2012	Ina, IL (Rend Lake)	Central Arizona	51	Spartanburg Methodist	105	Stanley Kebenei (Iowa Central)	25:02.6
2013	Fort Dodge, IA (Iowa Central)	Central Arizona	38	Iowa Central	53	Harry Mulenga (Central Arizona)	24:39.5
2014	Levelland, TX (South Plains)	Iowa Central	62	Central Arizona	68	Harry Mulenga (Central Arizona)	24:18
2015	Fort Dodge, IA (Iowa Central)	Iowa Central	56	Central Arizona	86	Gilbert Kigen (Central Arizona)	23:55.2
2016	El Dorado, KS (Butler)	Central Arizona	49	Iowa Central	62	Gilbert Kigen (Central Arizona)	23:47.45
2017	Fort Dodge, IA (Iowa Central)	Iowa Central	65	Central Arizona	112	Eric Fitzpatrick (Southern Idaho)	24:44
2018	Garden City, KS (Garden City)	Central Arizona	100	Iowa Central	118	Andrew Kibet (Hutchinson)	25:25.36
2019	Albuquerque, NM (neutral site)	Cloud County	89	El Paso	110	Wesley Banguria (Colby)	22:55
2020	Fort Dodge, IA (Iowa Central)	Iowa Central	65	Southern Idaho	95	Kelvin Bungei (Iowa Central)	24:57.38
2021	Richmond, VA	Iowa Central	67	Iowa Western	127	Vincent Nchogu (Northwest Kansas)	24:04.80
2022	Tallahassee, FL	Colby	38	Iowa Central	115	Sanele Masondo (Colby)	24:07.02
2023	Joplin, MO	Trinidad State	71	Salt Lake	78	JaQuavious Harris (Salt Lake)	23:18
2024	Richmond, VA	Salt Lake	52	Iowa Western	85	JaQuavious Harris (Salt Lake)	23:30.70
2025	Fort Dodge, IA (Iowa Central)	Iowa Central	58	Hutchinson	69	Cornelius Kogo (Hutchinson)	24:54.7

- A time highlighted in ██ indicates an NCAA championship record time for that distance at the time.

== Titles ==
=== Team titles ===
- List updated through the 2024 Championships

Team	Titles	Year Won
Central Arizona	8	1988, 2002, 2003, 2005, 2012, 2013, 2016, 2018
Brevard	6	1982, 1983, 1984, 1985, 1987, 1990
Iowa Central	6	2014, 2015, 2017, 2020, 2021, 2025
Ricks	5	1965, 1966, 1999, 2000, 2001
Southwestern Michigan	5	1973, 1974, 1975, 1978, 1981
Paradise Valley	3	2004, 2008, 2011
South Plains	3	1991, 1996, 1997
Allegheny County	3	1973, 1976, 1977
SUNY Cobleskill	3	1959, 1962, 1968
Rend Lake	2	2006, 2009
Butler	2	1970, 1995
Blinn	2	1993, 1994
Central Oregon	2	1989, 1992
Vincennes	2	1969, 1971
Muskegon County	2	1963, 1964

=== Individual titles ===
- List updated through the 2024 Championships

Rank	Team	Titles
1	Central Arizona	11
2	South Plains	6
3	Rend Lake; Butler; Brevard; Southwestern Michigan; Alleghany County	3
8	Iowa Central; Southern Idaho; Ricks; Dodge City; Blinn; Salt Lake	2
14	Hutchinson	1

== Appearances ==
- List updated through the 2020 Championships

=== Most team appearances (top 10) ===
Rank	Team	Appearances
1	Central Arizona	42
2	Butler	33
3	South Plains	29
4	Brevard	25
5	Southwestern Michigan	24
6	Southern Idaho	18
7	Iowa Central; El Paso	16
9	Johnson County; Paradise Valley; Ricks; Hutchinson	15

== Records ==
- Best Team Score: 15
  - SUNY Cobleskill
- Most Individual Titles: 2
  - Bob Gray, Brevard (1967-1968)
  - Mark Roberts, Central Arizona (1986-1987)
  - Phillimon Hanneck, South Plains (1990-1991)
  - Julius Wanjiru, Meridia & Butler (1995-1996)
  - Eliud Njubi, Dodge City (1998-1999)
  - Simon Ngata, Butler (2001-2002)
  - Obed Mutanya, Central Arizona (2003-2004)
  - Stephen Sambu, Rend Lake (2008-2009)
  - Harry Mulenga, Central Arizona (2013-2014)
  - Gilbert Kigen, Central Arizona (2015-2016)
  - JaQuavious Harris, Salt Lake (2022-2023)
- Best Individual Time, 5 miles: 23:26.4
  - Robin Holland, Alleghany County (1976)
- Best Individual Time, 8 kilometers: 22:36
  - Tyson David, Central Arizona (2006)

== See also ==
- NCAA Men's Division I Cross Country Championship
- NCAA Men's Division II Cross Country Championship (from 1958)
- NCAA Men's Division III Cross Country Championship (from 1973)
- Pre-NCAA Cross Country Champions
