= Bob Majeski =

American football coach (born c. 1962)

Current position
- Title: Defensive backs coach
- Team: Jacksonville HS (TX)

Biographical details
- Born: c. 1962 (age 63–64)
- Education: University of Nebraska Omaha (1986); Kearney State College (1988)

Playing career
- 1980–1983: Kansas State

Coaching career (HC unless noted)
- 1985–1986: Nebraska–Omaha (SA)
- 1987–1988: Kearney State (GA)
- 1989: Trinity Valley (OC)
- 1990: Rocky Mountain (DC)
- 1991–1995: Kansas Wesleyan (AHC/DC)
- 1996–1999: Black Hills State (AHC/DC)
- 2000–2002: Black Hills State
- 2003–2004: Wayne State (MI) (OC/QB)
- 2005: Trinity Valley (RGC)
- 2006–2007: Coffeyville (DC)
- 2008–2012: Dodge City
- 2013–2014: Highland (KS) (AHC/ST/DB)
- 2015–2018: Stetson (LB)
- 2019–2022: Oklahoma Panhandle State
- 2023: Southwestern Oklahoma State (OC)
- 2024–present: Jacksonville HS (TX) (DB)

Head coaching record
- Overall: 21–49 (college); 5–41 (junior college)

Robert Majeski Jr. (born c. 1962) is an American college football coach. He is the defensive backs coach for Jacksonville High School in Jacksonville, Texas, a position he has held since 2024. He was the head football coach for Black Hills State University from 2000 to 2002, Dodge City Community College from 2008 to 2012, and Oklahoma Panhandle State University from 2019 to 2022. He also coached for Nebraska–Omaha, Kearney State, Trinity Valley, Rocky Mountain, Kansas Wesleyan, Wayne State (MI), Coffeyville, Highland (KS), Stetson, and Southwestern Oklahoma State. He played college football for Kansas State.

== Head coaching record ==
=== College ===
Year	Team	Overall	Conference	Standing	Bowl/playoffs
Black Hills State Yellow Jackets (Dakota Athletic Conference) (2000–2002)
2000	Black Hills State	3–7	3–6	T–7th	
2001	Black Hills State	3–7	2–7	T–7th	
2002	Black Hills State	2–8	2–7	T–7th	
Black Hills State:		8–22	7–20		
Oklahoma Panhandle State Aggies (Sooner Athletic Conference) (2019–2022)
2019	Oklahoma Panhandle State	3–7	3–5	T–5th	
2020–21	Oklahoma Panhandle State	2–8	2–3	T–4th	
2021	Oklahoma Panhandle State	4–7	3–6	7th	
2022	Oklahoma Panhandle State	4–6	4–5	7th	
Oklahoma Panhandle State:		13–28	12–19		
Total:		21–49			

=== Junior college ===
Year	Team	Overall	Conference	Standing	Bowl/playoffs
Dodge City Conquistadors (Kansas Jayhawk Community College Conference) (2008–2012)
2008	Dodge City	2–7	2–5	T–5th	
2009	Dodge City	0–9	0–7	8th	
2010	Dodge City	0–9	0–7	8th	
2011	Dodge City	3–7	3–3	4th	
2012	Dodge City	0–9	0–7	8th	
Dodge City:		5–41	5–29		
Total:		5–41			
