= 2016 Garden City Broncbusters football team =

American college football season

2016 Garden City Broncbusters football

NJCAA champion KJCCC champion

El Toro Bowl, W 41–9 vs. Arizona Western
- Conference: Kansas Jayhawk Community College Conference
- Record: 11–0 (7–0 KJCCC)
- Head coach: Jeff Sims (2nd season)

2016 Kansas Jayhawk Community College Conference football standings
	Conf.			Overall
Team	W		L	W		L
No. 1 Garden City $	7	–	0	11	–	0
No. 15 Dodge City	4	–	3	7	–	4
No. 16 Highland (KS)	4	–	3	7	–	4
No. 17 Butler (KS)	4	–	3	7	–	5
Independence	4	–	3	5	–	4
Coffeyville	2	–	5	6	–	5
Hutchinson	2	–	5	5	–	6
Fort Scott	1	–	6	4	–	7
$ – Conference champion; Rankings from NJCAA poll

The 2016 Garden City Broncbusters football team was an American football team that represented Garden City Community College as a member of the Kansas Jayhawk Community College Conference (KJCCC) during the 2016 junior college football season. Led by second-year head coach Jeff Sims, the Broncbusters compiled a perfect 11–0 record, defeated Arizona Western in the El Toro Bowl, and won the NJCAA National Football Championship.

The team was led on offense by freshman quarterback Peyton Huslig.

== Schedule ==
Date	Opponent	Site	Result	Attendance	Source
August 27	at Ellsworth*	Iowa Falls, IA	W 30–7		
September 3	Highland (KS)	Garden City, KS	W 13–7		
September 10	Independence	Garden City, KS	W 25–7		
September 17	at Hutchinson	Hutchinson, KS	W 16–14		
October 1	Butler (KS)	Garden City, KS	W 43–0		
October 8	at Coffeyville	Coffeyville, KS	W 39–13		
October 15	at Iowa Western*	Council Bluffs, IA	W 27–17		
October 22	at Dodge City	Dodge City, KS	W 35–0		
November 5	Iowa Central*^{†}	Garden City, KS	W 35–0		
November 12	Fort Scott	Garden City, KS	W 27–6		
December 3	at Arizona Western*	Memorial Stadium; Yuma, AZ (El Toro Bowl)	W 25–22		
*Non-conference game; ^{†}Homecoming
