= Brian Vaganek =

American football coach (born 1970)

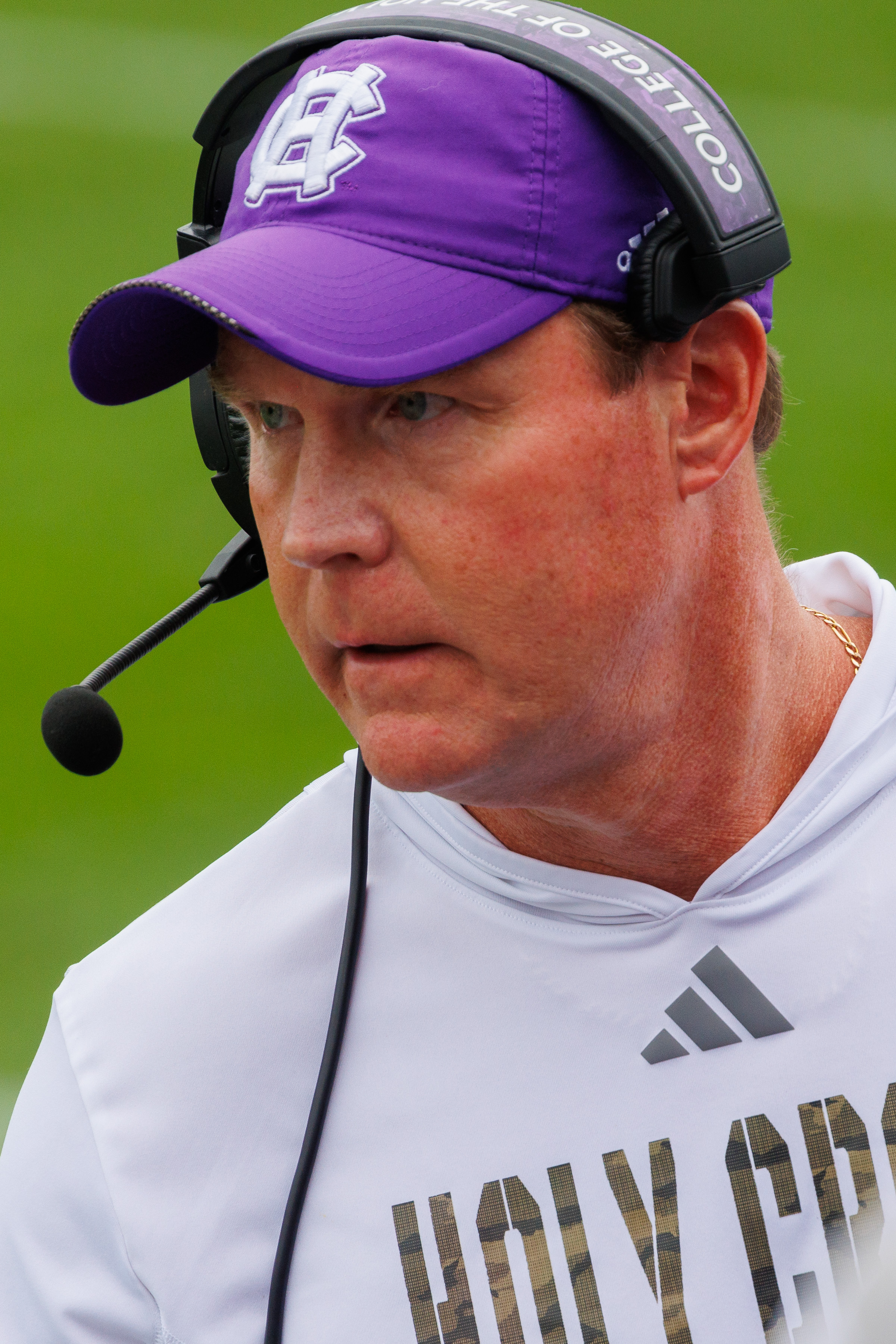
- Vaganek in 2024

Current position
- Title: Defensive coordinator & linebackers coach
- Team: Holy Cross
- Conference: Patriot League

Biographical details
- Born: July 12, 1970 (age 56); Buffalo, New York, U.S.
- Education: Temple University (1993)

Playing career
- 1989–1992: Temple
- Positions: Center, defensive tackle

Coaching career (HC unless noted)
- 1993: Highland (KS) (DL)
- 1994: Fort Scott (LB)
- 1995–1998: William & Mary (LB)
- 1999: William & Mary (DL)
- 2000: William & Mary (DC/DL)
- 2001–2003: Hofstra (DL)
- 2004–2005: Fort Scott
- 2006: Maynard Evans HS (FL) (DC)
- 2007–2010: Christopher Newport (assoc. HC/DC)
- 2011: Rhode Island (DL)
- 2012–2013: Rhode Island (DC/DL)
- 2014–2016: New Haven (DC/LB)
- 2017–2023: Holy Cross (LB)
- 2024–present: Holy Cross (DC/LB)

Head coaching record
- Overall: 0–18
- Tournaments: 0–2 (KJCCC playoffs)

Brian Vaganek Sr. (born July 12, 1970) is an American college football coach. He is the defensive coordinator and linebackers coach for the College of the Holy Cross, positions he has held since 2024. He was the head football coach for Fort Scott Community College from 2004 to 2005. He also coached for Highland (KS), William & Mary, Hofstra, Maynard Evans High School, Christopher Newport, Rhode Island, and New Haven. He played college football for Temple as a center and defensive tackle.

== Head coaching record ==
Year	Team	Overall	Conference	Standing	Bowl/playoffs
Fort Scott Greyhounds (Kansas Jayhawk Community College Conference) (2004–2005)
2004	Fort Scott	0–9	0–7	8th	L KJCCC first round
2005	Fort Scott	0–9	0–7	8th	L KJCCC first round
Fort Scott:		0–18	0–14		
Total:		0–18			
