= JUCO World Series =

Annual baseball tournament

The JUCO World Series is an annual baseball tournament held across three divisions of National Junior College Athletic Association baseball. Taking place in late May and early June each year, it determines the junior college baseball national champions.

== NJCAA playoff format ==
The NJCAA baseball playoff format for reaching the JUCO World Series is generally the same for all divisions, regions, and districts with few exceptions. The postseason begins with a Region Sectional. This is a best-of-three series against another team from the region. Oftentimes the top eight seeds in a given region will be seeded one through eight. With this being the case, the number one team would face the number eight seed in the first round and so on. The four winners of these opening round series then advance to the Region Championship. The Region Championship is a four team double elimination tournament that determines the winners of each of the NJCAA's twenty-four regions. Each of the Region Champions then advances to the District Championship. The District Championship is generally a three-game series contested between two region champions to determine who receives that district's bid to the JUCO World Series. In Divisions I and II, the ten district champions continue on to the JUCO World Series where a double elimination tournament decides that year's national champion. In Division III, the seven district champions plus an at-large selection, a runner-up from one of the district championships, reach the JUCO World Series and play a double elimination tournament to determine the national champion.

== Division I College World Series ==
Since 1977, the champion of each of the NJCAA's ten regionally defined districts advance to the event. It is held as a ten team, double-elimination tournament. Several different brackets and schedules have been used since the event began in 1958. In the first season, the event was an eight-team bracket leading to placement, with the winners of their first two games playing for the championship, while others played for respective places. In 1959, the NJCAA adopted the double-elimination format. In 1977, the event expanded to ten teams, and has remained so ever since. The Division I College World Series is held annually in Grand Junction, Colorado at Sam Suplizio Field.

=== Division I Champions ===
Year	Champion	Most Outstanding Player
1958	Cameron Junior College	Patrick O'Dell, Lawton
1959	Paris Junior College	Glendell Baker, Paris
1960	Phoenix College	Mickey Lee, Tarleton State
1961	Wilmington Junior College	Ronnie Durham, Wilmington
1962	Phoenix College	Lee McFarland, Phoenix
1963	Wilmington Junior College	Ken Wideman, Long Island
1964	Miami Dade Junior College	Mack Hendreau, Mesa
1965	Phoenix College	Tom Burgess, Phoenix
1966	Nassau Community College	Joe Arnold, Miami Dade
1967	Bacone Junior College	Gerald Pirtle, Bacone
1968	Glendale Community College (AZ)	Otic McCowan, Glendale (AZ)
1969	Panola College	Doug Ault, Panola
1970	Mesa Community College	Larry Patton, Columbia
1971	Mesa Community College	Jim Otten, Mesa
1972	Mesa Community College	Greg Snowden, Mesa
1973	Ranger Junior College	Donnie Moore, Ranger
1974	Meramec Community College	Steve Viefhaus, Meramec
1975	Yavapai Junior College	Neil Fiala, Meramec
1976	Central Arizona College	Jim Morley, Central Arizona
1977	Yavapai Junior College	Dan Townsend, Yavapai
1978	Ranger Junior College	Jim Mick, Ranger
1979	Middle Georgia College	Tommie Dunbar, Middle Georgia
1980	Middle Georgia College	Greg Geren, Cleveland State
1981	Miami Dade Junior College	Curtis Morgan, Seminole
1982	Middle Georgia College	Kal Daniels, Middle Georgia
1983	McLennan Community College	David Turner, McLennan
1984	College of Southern Idaho	Shell Scott, Southern Idaho
1985	San Jacinto College-North	Randy Randle, San Jacinto
1986	San Jacinto College-North	Brian Deak, Yavapai
1987	San Jacinto College-North	Bill Losa, San Jacinto
1988	Hillsborough Community College	Chris Hanks, Southern Idaho
1989	San Jacinto College-North	David Evans, San Jacinto
1990	San Jacinto College-North	Randy Brown, San Jacinto
1991	Howard College (TX)	Frank Rodriguez, Howard
1992	Essex Community College (MD)	Mike Peters, Essex
1993	Yavapai Junior College	Kevin Pitts, Triton
1994	Galveston College	José Rosado, Galveston
1995	Middle Georgia College	Brian Davis, Middle Georgia
1996	Northeast Texas Community College	Robert Vaz, Northeast Texas
1997	Cowley County Community College (KS)	Travis Hafner, Cowley
1998	Cowley County Community College (KS)	Josh McMillen, Cowley
1999	Grayson College (TX)	Matt Gawer, Grayson
2000	Grayson College (TX)	Adam LaRoche, Seminole State
2001	North Central Texas College	Blake Justice, North Central Texas
2002	Central Arizona College	Gabe Mayorga, Central Arizona
2003	College of Southern Nevada	Tyler Coon, Southern Nevada
2004	Dixie State College	Matt Spring, Dixie State
2005	New Mexico Junior College	Renny Osuna, NMJC
2006	Walters State Community College	Jack Tilghman, Walters State
2007	Chipola College	Drew Parker, Chipola
2008	Grayson College (TX)	J. D. Alfaro, Grayson
2009	Howard College (TX)	Andrew Collazo, Howard
2010	Iowa Western Community College	Ivan Hartle, Iowa Western
2011	Navarro College	J. T. Files, Navarro
2012	Iowa Western Community College	Keaton Steele, Iowa Western
2013	Central Alabama Community College	Darius Reece, Central Alabama
2014	Iowa Western Community College	Alex Krupa, Iowa Western
2015	Northwest Florida State College	Ramon Osuna, Walters State
2016	Yavapai Junior College	Rashaan Kuhaulua, Yavapai
2017	Chipola College	José Caballero, Chipola
2018	Chipola College	Morgan McCullough, Chipola
2019	Central Arizona College	Hunter Jump, Central Arizona
2020	No tournament held	
2021	McLennan Community College	Logan Henderson, McLennan
2022	Central Arizona College	Kiko Romero, Central Arizona
2023	College of Central Florida	Juan Correa, Central Florida
2024	Blinn College	Cade Climie, Blinn
2025	Salt Lake Community College	Jalen Seward, Salt Lake
2026	Johnson County Community College	Ashton Hartwig, Johnson County

== Division II College World Series ==
The NJCAA Division II College World Series is held annually in Enid, Oklahoma at David Allen Memorial Ballpark. The World Series was previously held in Millington, Tennessee from 1993 until 2008. It has remained in Enid, Oklahoma since 2009. The Division II tournament is a double elimination tournament contested by the ten district champions. The Division II format is largely the same as the Division I tournament, being that there are ten teams competing for the national championship in a double elimination format.

=== Division II Champions ===
Year	Champion	Most Outstanding Player
1993	Massasoit Community College	
1994	Lincoln Land Community College	
1995	Potomac State College	Chris Reyes, Potomac State
1996	Grand Rapids Community College	
1997	Grand Rapids Community College	
1998	Jefferson Davis Community College	
1999	Kishwaukee College	
2000	Lincoln Land Community College	Scott Blackwell, Lincoln Land
2001	Delaware Technical Community College	Brian Elder, Delaware Tech
2002	Parkland College	Daniel Grant, Parkland
2003	Grand Rapids Community College	Justin McKenzie, Grand Rapids
2004	Grand Rapids Community College	
2005	Grand Rapids Community College	
2006	Louisiana State University at Eunice	Brett Durand, LSU-Eunice
2007	Longview Community College	Ben Knuth, Longview
2008	Louisiana State University at Eunice	Perry Smith, LSU-Eunice
2009	Parkland College	Kevin Kiermaier, Parkland
2010	Louisiana State University at Eunice	Gabriel Thibodeaux, LSU-Eunice
2011	Western Oklahoma State College	Jhiomar Veras, Western Oklahoma State
2012	Louisiana State University at Eunice	Stuart Turner, LSU-Eunice
2013	Murray State College	Noel Nevarez, Murray State
2014	Mesa Community College	Jordan Zimmerman, Mesa
2015	Louisiana State University at Eunice	David LaFluer, LSU-Eunice
2016	Jones County Junior College	Erick Hoard, Jones County
2017	Kankakee Community College	Matt Littrell, Kankakee
2018	Louisiana State University at Eunice	Koi Westbrook, LSU-Eunice
2019	Northern Oklahoma College-Enid	Brandon Hudson, Northern Oklahoma-Enid
2020	no tournament	
2021	Louisiana State University at Eunice	Peyton LeJeune, LSU-Eunice
2022	Pearl River Community College	D.K. Donaldson, Pearl River
2023	Heartland Community College	Meade Johnson, Heartland
2024	Louisiana State University at Eunice	Dawson Willis, LSU-Eunice
2025	Pasco–Hernando State College	Bradon Durfee, Pasco–Hernando State
2026	Pearl River Community College	Jackson Beddoe, Pearl River

== Division III College World Series ==
The NJCAA Division III College World Series is held annually in Greeneville, Tennessee at Pioneer Park. The Division III World Series was originally held in Jamestown, New York from 1993-1994. It then moved to Batavia, New York from 1995-2004 before moving again to Glens Falls, New York for the 2005-2006 seasons. It was held in Tyler, Texas from 2007-2014. It changed sites once again for the 2015-2016 seasons when Kinston, North Carolina hosted. The World Series has been held in Greeneville, Tennessee since 2017. The double elimination tournament pits the seven district champions plus an at-large selection against each other to determine the NJCAA Division III baseball national champion. Unlike the Division I and II tournaments, there are only seven districts in Division III, rather than ten. This allows for a non-district champion to reach the finals with an at-large bid to round out the tournament at a more even eight teams.

=== Division III Champions ===
Year	Champion
1993	Gloucester County College
1994	Joliet Junior College
1995	Madison Area Technical College
1996	Madison Area Technical College
1997	Madison Area Technical College
1998	Norwalk Community-Technical College
1999	Gloucester County College
2000	Gloucester County College
2001	Eastfield College
2002	Richland College
2003	Richland College
2004	Richland College
2005	Gloucester County College
2006	Eastfield College
2007	Tyler Junior College
2008	Joliet Junior College
2009	Richland College
2010	Gloucester County College
2011	Eastfield College
2012	Joliet Junior College
2013	Gloucester County College
2014	Tyler Junior College
2015	Tyler Junior College
2016	Tyler Junior College
2017	Tyler Junior College
2018	Oakton Community College
2019	Cumberland County College
2020	no tournament
2021	Tyler Junior College
2022	Herkimer County Community College
2023	Rowan College of South Jersey
2024	Rowan College of South Jersey
2025	Rowan College of South Jersey
2026	SUNY Niagara

== See also ==
- Baseball awards § U.S. college baseball
- National Junior College Athletics Association
