= Jeff Sims (American football coach) =

American football coach

Playing career
- c. 1994: Baker

Coaching career (HC unless noted)
- 1995: Maryville HS (MO) (WR/DB)
- 1996: Central Missouri State (GA/RB)
- 1997–1998: Baker (WR)
- 1999–2000: Mt. San Antonio (QB/WR/ST)
- 2001: Pasadena HS (CA)
- 2002–2003: Mesabi Range
- 2004–2005: Minnesota State (co-OC / RC)
- 2006: Southern Arkansas (OC)
- 2007–2010: Fort Scott
- 2011: Indiana (QC recruiting)
- 2012: Florida Atlantic (associate HC / WR /RC)
- 2015–2018: Garden City
- 2019: Missouri Southern

Head coaching record
- Overall: 2–9 (college); 77–32 (junior college)
- Bowls: 1–2 (junior college)
- Tournaments: 3–2 (KJCCC playoffs); 1–1 (MCCC playoffs)

Accomplishments and honors

Championships
- 1 NJCAA National (2016); 3 KJCCC (2009, 2016, 2018); 1 MCCC North Division (2003)

Jeff Sims is an American former football coach. He served the head football coach at Mesabi Range Junior College—now known as Minnesota North College – Mesabi Range Virginia–in Virginia, Minnesota, from 2002 to 2003, Fort Scott Community College in Fort Scott, Kansas, from 2007 to 2010, and Garden City Community College in Garden City, Kansas, from 2015 to 2018. He led his 2016 Garden City Broncbusters football team to a NJCAA National Football Championship. Sims was also the head football coach at Missouri Southern State University for one season, in 2019. He led the Missouri Southern Lions to a record of 2–9 in 2019. The team did not compete in the fall of 2020 because of the COVID-19 pandemic. Sims was fired from his post at the school in December 2020.

Sims now works as the managing director of You Move Me, a moving company based in Lenexa, Kansas.

== Head coaching record ==
=== College ===
Year	Team	Overall	Conference	Standing	Bowl/playoffs
Missouri Southern Lions (Mid-America Intercollegiate Athletics Association) (2019)
2019	Missouri Southern	2–9	2–9	10th	
Missouri Southern:		2–9	2–9		
Total:		2–9			

=== Junior college ===
Year	Team	Overall	Conference	Standing	Bowl/playoffs	NJCAA^{#}
Mesabi Range Norse (Minnesota Community College Conference) (2002–2003)
2002	Mesabi Range	3–6	3–2	T–2nd (Northern)		
2003	Mesabi Range	10–1	5–0	1st (Northern)	L MCCC championship	
Mesabi Range:		13–7	8–2			
Fort Scott Greyhounds (Kansas Jayhawk Community College Conference) (2007–2010)
2007	Fort Scott	9–3	6–1	2nd	L KJCCC championship	
2008	Fort Scott	9–2	6–1	2nd	L KJCCC semifinal	
2009	Fort Scott	11–1	7–0	1st	W KJCCC championship, L Citizens Bank Bowl	
2010	Fort Scott	3–6	3–4	5th		
Fort Scott:		32–12	22–6			
Garden City Broncbusters (Kansas Jayhawk Community College Conference) (2015–2018)
2015	Garden City	3–8	2–5	T–6th		
2016	Garden City	11–0	7–0	1st	W El Toro Bowl	1
2017	Garden City	8–4	5–2	T–2nd	L C.H.A.M.P.S. Heart of Texas Bowl	13
2018	Garden City	10–1	7–0	1st	L NJCAA National Championship	2
Garden City:		32–13	21–7			
Total:		77–32				
National championship Conference title Conference division title or championship game berth
