= Ross Bjork =

American college athletics administrator (born 1972)

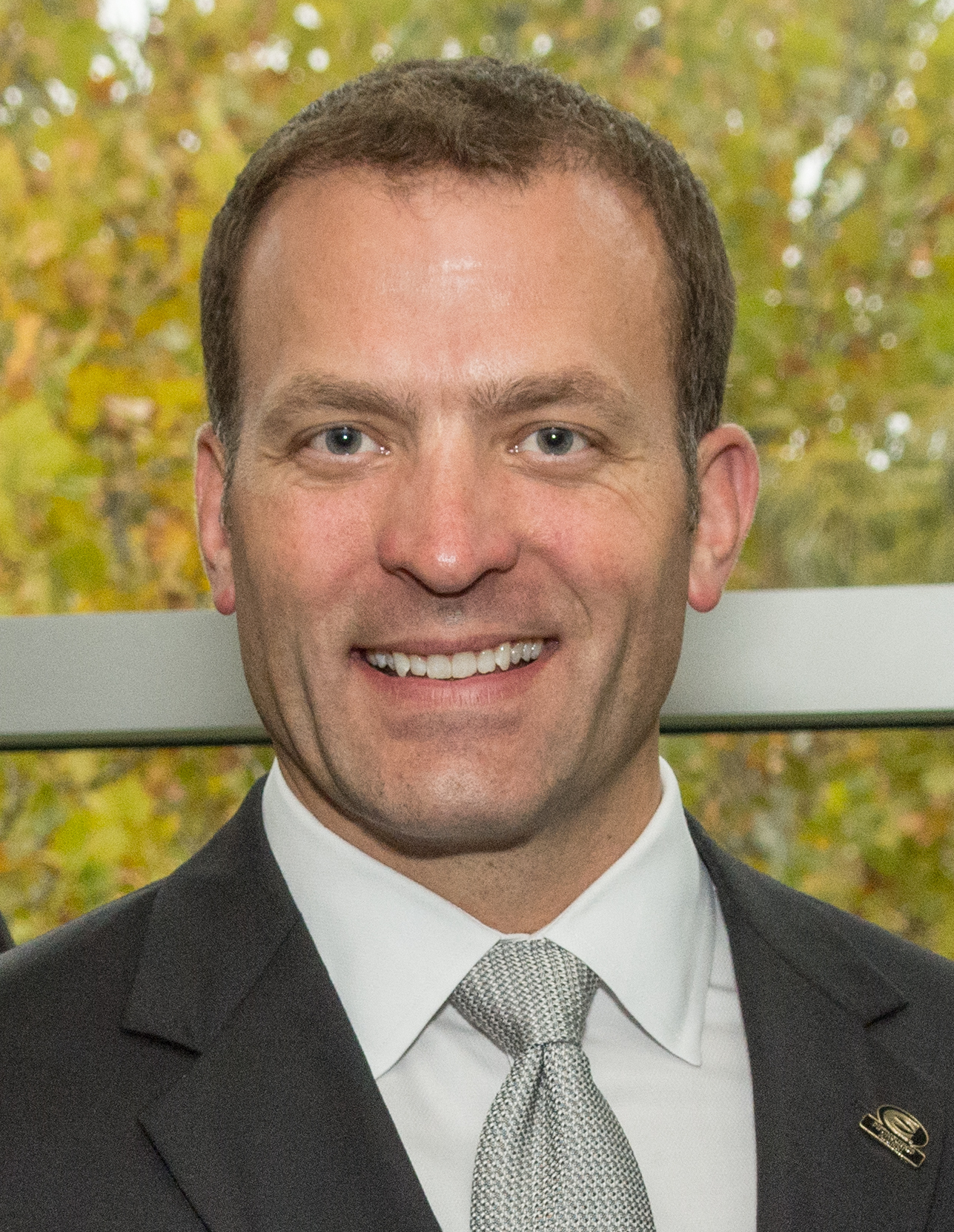
- Bjork in 2017

Current position
- Title: Athletic director
- Team: Ohio State
- Conference: Big Ten
- Annual salary: $1.65 million

Biographical details
- Born: October 22, 1972 (age 54); Dodge City, Kansas, U.S.
- Education: Dodge City Community College (associate); Emporia State University (bachelor's); Western Illinois University (MS)

Playing career
- 1991–1992: Dodge City
- 1993–1994: Emporia State
- Position: Fullback

Administrative career (AD unless noted)
- 1996–1997: Western Kentucky (dev. offc.)
- 1997–2001: Missouri (athletic dev. offc.)
- 2001–2003: Missouri (asst. AD for dev.)
- 2003–2005: Miami (FL) (assoc. AD)
- 2005–2010: UCLA (senior assoc. AD)
- 2010–2012: Western Kentucky
- 2012–2019: Ole Miss
- 2019–2024: Texas A&M
- 2024–present: Ohio State

Ross Bjork (born October 22, 1972) is an American college athletics administrator. He is the athletic director at Ohio State University, a position he had held since 2024. Bjork served as the athletic director at Western Kentucky University from 2010 to 2012, the University of Mississippi (Ole Miss) from 2012 to 2019, and Texas A&M University from 2019 to 2024. Bjork previously in the athletic departments at the University of Miami, University of California, Los Angeles (UCLA), and the University of Missouri.

== Early life and playing career ==
A native of Dodge City, Kansas, Bjork graduated from Dodge City High School in 1991. Bjork then earned an associate degree from Dodge City Community College, where he played football as a Fullback. Bjork transferred to Emporia State University, where he also played fullback and received his bachelor's degree in 1995. He earned his master's degree from Western Illinois University in 1996. Bjork is married to Sonya and has two sons, Payton and Paxton.

== Administrative career ==
Bjork started his administrative career in 1996 at Western Kentucky University where he was an assistant development coordinator. Bjork then spent time in the athletics departments at the University of Missouri (1997–2003), University of Miami (2003–2005), UCLA (2005–2010). In 2010, Bjork returned to Western Kentucky as its Athletics Director, where he was the youngest athletic director among all 120 NCAA FBS schools when hired.

While at Western Kentucky, Bjork made several high-profile decisions. In 2011, then-WKU defensive coordinator Lance Guidry was arrested for driving under the influence in Baton Rouge, Louisiana the day before WKU played LSU. Guidry coached WKU in its 42–9 loss and Bjork never suspended Guidry. Bjork also fired Women's basketball coach Mary Taylor Cowes and Men's basketball coach Ken McDonald.

In 2012, Bjork left WKU to become the Athletics Director at Ole Miss. Ole Miss saw several scandals during Bjork's tenure. Just seven months into the job, Bjork fired women's basketball coach Adrian Wiggins for recruiting violations. NCAA investigations revealed persistent football recruiting violations, including evidence that Ole Miss employees and boosters arranged numerous "impermissible benefits" for players, such as car loans and cash. At least one recruit was suspected of getting help on his college entrance exam. Ole Miss officials began calling reporters, telling them falsely that most of the alleged violations had taken place under Freeze's predecessor Houston Nutt.

In July 2017, Houston Nutt sued Ole Miss for defamation. The lawsuit was settled in October 2017, and Ole Miss issued an apology to Nutt. In discovery for that lawsuit, Nutt's lawyers discovered that Hugh Freeze had been calling escort services from his university phone. Bjork then allowed Freeze to resign.

In 2019, Bjork left Ole Miss to become the Athletics Director at Texas A&M. Following a 9–1 season in 2020 which saw the Aggies finish fifth in the final College Football Playoff rankings, Bjork gave football head coach Jimbo Fisher a four-year extension through 2031, which raised his salary from $7.5 million to $9 million. Bjork fired Jimbo Fisher in 2023 during a disappointing season which saw the Aggies finish 7–6 with a loss in the Texas Bowl. Fisher was 45–25 in six seasons at Texas A&M. The $76 million buyout owed to Fisher is triple the next-highest known coaching buyout by a public school.

Bjork then tried to hire Kentucky head coach Mark Stoops as Fisher's replacement. After reportedly closing in on a deal with Stoops, the decision was reportedly nixed at the last minute by the Texas A&M board of regents. The decision to not hire Stoops was also due to the immense backlash from the fanbase. Just a day later, Texas A&M hired former Duke University head coach Mike Elko.

On January 16, 2024, Ohio State University announced that Bjork had been hired as its next athletic director, effective July 1, 2024, with a transition period beginning March 1, 2024. Bjork is the 9th Athletic Director at Ohio State. In the first year under Bjork's watch, the Buckeyes football team would win the 2024 College Football Playoff National Championship.
