= Nola Ochs =

American centenarian (1911–2016)

- Born: Nola Hill; November 22, 1911; Jetmore, Kansas, U.S.
- Died: December 9, 2016 (aged 105); Dodge City, Kansas, U.S.
- Education: Dodge City Community College; Fort Hays State University
- Known for: World's oldest college graduate
- Spouse: Vernon Ochs (m. 1933–1972; his death)
- Children: Four

Nola Ochs (née Hill) (November 22, 1911 – December 9, 2016) was an American woman, from Jetmore, Kansas, who in 2007, at age 95, graduated from college and was certified by Guinness World Records as the oldest person in the world to become a college graduate, until Shigemi Hirata in 2016.

== Personal life ==
A native of Jetmore, Kansas, Ochs was born in 1911 and took her first college class from Fort Hays State University in 1930, when the university was called the Kansas State College. Nola and her husband Vernon Ochs raised four sons (who have given her 13 grandchildren and 15 great-grandchildren) on the family farm. She took college courses again part time from Dodge City Community College in Dodge City, Kansas, after her husband of 39 years died in 1972 and eventually came within 30 credits of a bachelor's degree. In 2006, Nola moved 100 miles from the family farm to an FHSU university apartment in Hays to finish her degree. During her first year at FHSU, Ochs told news reporters that after she graduated, she wanted to be a storyteller on a cruise ship.

She was predeceased by two sons, one of whom died in 1995 and another, Marion J. Ochs, died on March 15, 2016, at the age of 72.

== World record ==
On May 14, 2007, Ochs became a Guinness World Record holder as the world's oldest college graduate when she received her diploma at Fort Hays State University (FHSU) in Hays, Kansas. She earned a general studies degree with an emphasis in history, graduating alongside her granddaughter, Alexandra Ochs, who was 21 years old at the time.

=== Media appearances ===
Among her accomplishments, Ochs was named the 2007 Kansas Woman Leader of the Year and was given her diploma by Kansas Governor Kathleen Sebelius. Features on Ochs aired on The Early Show, MSNBC, and CBS News among others. She even earned a spot on The Tonight Show one week after she graduated, sharing a laugh with Jay Leno. After graduation, Princess Cruises hired her as a guest lecturer on a nine-day Caribbean cruise. She shared the adventure with her granddaughter Alexandra.

After taking time to help with the family wheat harvest, Ochs started pursuing her master's degree in liberal studies from Fort Hays State University in August 2007. She received her master's on May 15, 2010, making her the oldest recipient of a master's degree at age 98. According to an August 11, 2006, press release from FHSU, Ochs said "I don't keep track of my age, but I can tell you I was born in November of 1911." She also commented, "I've led a long, interesting life. We went through the dust storms. We had some difficult times in our marriage, financially. But it's been the Lord's will that I've lived this long life, and I thank Him kindly for it." As of her 100th birthday in November 2011 she was an MA student at FHSU and a graduate teaching assistant. Ochs died on December 9, 2016, at the age of 105.

== See also ==
- Phyllis Turner, the second oldest person to have received a master's degree
