= Phyllis Turner =

Australian anthropologist

Phyllis Mary Turner (c. 1913 – 24 June 2009) was an Australian woman who was the second oldest person to have received a master's degree. Having left school at age 12, Turner returned to study at the age of 70, to study Anthropology. Turner was awarded her Medical Science master's degree, at the age of 94, from Adelaide University in August, 2007.

== See also ==
- Nola Ochs, who became Guinness World Record holder as the world's oldest college graduate in 2007
