= Labette Community College =

Public college in Parsons, Kansas, US

- Labette Community College Seal
- Former names: Parsons Junior College; Labette Community Junior College
- Motto: Ubi de te Omnia
- Motto in English: Where It's All About You!
- Type: Public
- Established: 1923
- President: Dr. Jason Sharp
- Students: 1,446 (Fall 2023)
- Location: Parsons, Kansas, United States; 37°20′21″N 95°15′19″W
- Colors: Red and black
- Nickname: Labette Cardinals
- Sporting affiliations: Kansas Jayhawk Community College Conference
- Website: www.labette.edu

Labette Community College (LCC) is a public community college in Parsons, Kansas, United States. LCC's main campus is situated in Parsons and satellite campuses are located in Cherokee, Oswego and Pittsburg. The mascot of the school is Chris the Cardinal. The official school colors are red and white.

== History ==
It was established in the fall of 1923 as Parsons Junior College, and was initially financed and operated as a part of the public school system of Parsons as a two-year extension program of the Senior High School. Until 1935, the college was operated as a two-year unit, and was a jumping off point for students desiring to continue their education at a four-year university. In 1935 however, the schools of Parsons became organized into a 6-4-4 basis. Under this new system, the Junior College was a new four-year system, and instructed grades eleven, twelve, thirteen, and fourteen inclusively.

Like most community colleges and junior colleges, Parsons Junior College was first established to answer the ever-increasing demands for better public school systems. With the arrival of the MKT Railroad in Parsons, the city began to grow rapidly, requiring Parsons to adapt and create new institutions to help meet the community's educational needs. Like most rural towns that contain a community college or university, Parsons Junior College served as one of the main focal points of the community as it provided a two-year Associates program for higher education through 1935.

In 1967 Parsons Junior College became known as the Labette Community Junior College, following the new trends of the time period, separating Community Colleges as local, publicly funded school system, and Junior Colleges as private degree institutions. The college remained known by this name until 1980 when the school finally adopted the name of Labette Community College, which remains the name of the college to this day. In 1967 Parsons Junior College became known as the Labette Community Junior College, following the new trends of the time period, separating Community Colleges as local, publicly funded school system, and Junior Colleges as private degree institutions. The college remained known by this name until 1980 when the school finally adopted the name of Labette Community College, which remains the name of the college to this day.

== Cherokee Campus ==
In 2008 Labette Community College opened a satellite campus in Cherokee County, Kansas on the outskirts of Pittsburg, Kansas.

Labette Community College renovated a 14,000 square foot, ten acre, space on the corner of highways 400 and 69, near Pittsburg to better serve the students of southeast Kansas. Seven classrooms, a student commons area with computers, and office space for faculty.

LCC is offering remedial and general education courses, which prepare students to pass placement tests that are required before taking college-level courses.

== Student life ==
Labette Community College has academic and athletic extracurricular activities. Some of the programs available currently are: Men's and Women's basketball, volleyball, baseball. softball, and wrestling. LCC won the NJCAA national basketball title in 1960, and were the national men's wrestling champions in 2005, 2012 and 2013.

== Notable alumni and faculty ==
- Rand Chappell, college basketball coach
- LC Davis, mixed martial artist
- Tim Elliott, professional mixed martial artist competing for UFC, former Titan FC Flyweight Champion,
- Raufeon Stots, two-time NCAA Division II Wrestling Champion, current Bellator mixed martial artist
