= Allen Red Devils =

- College: Allen Community College
- Association: NJCAA
- Conference: Kansas Jayhawk Community College Conference
- Athletic director: Doug Desmarteau
- Location: Iola, Kansas
- Varsity teams: 14
- Nickname: Red Devils
- Fight song: "Red Devil Fight Song"
- Colors: Black and Scarlet
- Website: allenreddevils.com

The Allen Red Devils are the sports teams of Allen Community College located in Iola, Kansas. They participate in the National Junior College Athletic Association and in the Kansas Jayhawk Community College Conference.

== Sports ==
Men's sports

- Baseball
- Basketball
- Cross country
- Golf
- Soccer
- Track & Field

Women's sports

- Basketball
- Cheer/Dance
- Cross country
- Soccer
- Softball
- Track & Field
- Volleyball
