= Allen Community College =

Public college in Iola and Burlingame, Kansas, US

Coordinates: 37°56′17″N 95°23′47″W

- Motto: Quality Education in a Caring Atmosphere
- Type: Public community college
- Established: April 3, 1923
- Endowment: $15.2 million
- President: Lyvier Leffler
- Students: 1,817 (Fall 2023)
- Location: Iola, Kansas, U.S.
- Campus: Rural community
- Colors: Black and scarlet
- Nickname: Red Devils
- Website: www.allencc.edu

Allen Community College is a public community college in Iola, Kansas, United States. Allen offers both online and in-person courses for incoming students. Allen is also approved through the Kansas Board of Regents to offer degrees and certificates.

== History ==
Allen County College, formerly Allen County Community College, was established in 1923. The original name of the college was the Iola Junior College and it was a part of district 10 under the jurisdiction of the Board of Education of Iola Public Schools. Since the population of Iola was growing and there was only one main high school for residents to attend, there was a need for expansion. The college was originally designed to be an expansion, added onto the third floor of Iola High School. The addition was a success and that first year, there was an enrollment of 93 students. This new addition, Iola Junior College, remained a part of the high school for a total of 42 years. In June 1965, the local Board of Education successfully petitioned the State Superintendent of the Public Instruction to create a countywide community college. The petition was approved and thus, Allen County Community Junior College has now separated and its own entity.

=== Expansion and growth ===
Although the idea of Allen County Community Junior College was now completely separated from any other building, the college still had requirements to be met before becoming a physical structure. A year after the original petition was granted, the voters of Allen County had approved a $1,500,00 bond issue, permitting the construction of the main campus on the northern edge of Iola. With the community in mind, a means for student boarding was also permitted and on August 25, 1969, A 96-bed residence hall (Horton Hall) was opened for occupancy. Only a few months later in Spring 1970, the college was official open and running and officially held its first class on the new 90-acre Iola Campus January 5, 1970. Over the next several years the college found itself steadily growing in population and eventually needed to make more expansions. In 1976, an all-weather track was built on campus to provide a place for the track & field teams to practice and hold meets. In 1979, was yet another big purchase on behalf of the college. The Board of Trustees authorized the purchase of a 250-acre farm to enhance the agriculture program; this farm being located only five miles north of Iola. This farm, over the next few years, received several additions as well. A large animal and classroom building was built on the farm grounds in 1982, and in 1988 an official horse barn was added. In May, 2000, an eight student Zahn Scholorship House was dedicated to the school as a gift from an alumnus to give agricultural students an opportunity to reside there while enrolled at the college. Although Allen County Community Junior College was making quite a few adding improvements, in the 1980s, the school had officially shortened its name to Allen County Community College.

ACCC was rapidly enhancing its campus, drawing in attention from possible students from nearby cities and this was starting to become an issue that was essentially an easy fix. In August, 1983, came the construction of Winter Hall, a slightly smaller, 56-bed residence hall. Also added was a physical fitness trial in the summer of 1994. In 1985, the Activities Building was built. The Activities Building measures in at 1800 square feet with the purpose for student recreations and winter indoor sport practices. In 1989, A fitness center was constructed on the inside of the Activities Building, fully equipped for everyday use. Also built in 1989 on the Allen County Community College campus was a 15,000 square foot Technology Building along with an Interactive Television Studio.

=== Burlingame Campus ===
In the spring of 1991, the Burlingame Campus began operations in a 7,500 square foot building built in a cooperative venture between the City of Burlingame, the unified school district, and ACCC. Two modular units were added in 1995, providing six more classrooms. An addition that more than doubled the size of the original building was completed in the fall of 2001. Allen County Community College now enrolls approximately 1,800 students each semester in the programs offered on the campuses in Iola and Burlingame, over Interactive Television, on the Internet, and at the outreach sites located within the six-county service area. Due to dwindling enrollment and the COVID-19 pandemic, the Burlingame campus was closed in 2023.

== Athletics ==
The athletic program at Allen Community College fields 12 varsity teams and competes in the Eastern Division of the Kansas Jayhawk Community College Conference.
