= Neosho County Panthers =

Sports teams of Neosho County Community College in Chanute, Kansas, US

- University: Neosho County Community College
- Association: NJCAA
- Conference: Kansas Jayhawk Community College Conference
- Athletic director: Riann Mullis
- Location: Chanute, Kansas
- Varsity teams: 10
- Basketball arena: Fieldhouse
- Baseball stadium: Hudson Field
- Soccer stadium: Soccer Complex
- Nickname: Panthers
- Colors: Black and orange
- Website: goneosho.com

The Neosho County Panthers are the sports teams of Neosho County Community College located in Chanute, Kansas, United States. They participate in the National Junior College Athletic Association (NJCAA) and in the Kansas Jayhawk Community College Conference (KJCCC).

== Sports ==
Men's sports

- Baseball
- Basketball
- Soccer
- Track & field
- Wrestling
- Cheer & Dance

Women's sports

- Basketball
- Soccer
- Softball
- Track & field
- Volleyball
- Cheer & Dance

== Facilities ==
Neosho County Community College facilities are listed below.

- Hudson Field – home of the Panthers baseball team
- Soccer Complex – home of the Panthers soccer and track & field teams
