= Pratt Community College =

Public college in Pratt, Kansas, US

- Motto: Learning from the Best. Experience the Difference.
- Type: Public community college
- Established: 1935
- Academic affiliations: NJCAA
- President: empty
- Vice-president: Monette DePew
- Provost: Kent Adams
- Dean: Lisa Perez Miller
- Students: 1,322 (Fall 2024)
- Location: Pratt, Kansas, United States; 37°39′16″N 98°42′52″W
- Colors: Blue and white
- Nickname: Beavers
- Sporting affiliations: Kansas Jayhawk Community College Conference
- Mascot: Bucky Beaver
- Website: prattcc.edu

Pratt Community College is a public community college in Pratt, Kansas, United States.

== Athletics ==
The official mascot for Pratt Community College is the Beaver. Pratt CC participates in 11 sports in the NJCAA and in the Kansas Jayhawk Community College Conference.

== Notable alumni ==
- Rod Brown, professional basketball player
- Ricky Byrdsong, college basketball coach
- Paul Stovall, professional basketball player
- Terry Tiffee, professional baseball infielder
- Cecil Turner, football player (Pratt Junior College)
