= Colby Community College =

Community college in Colby, Kansas, US

Coordinates: 39°22′41″N 101°03′07″W

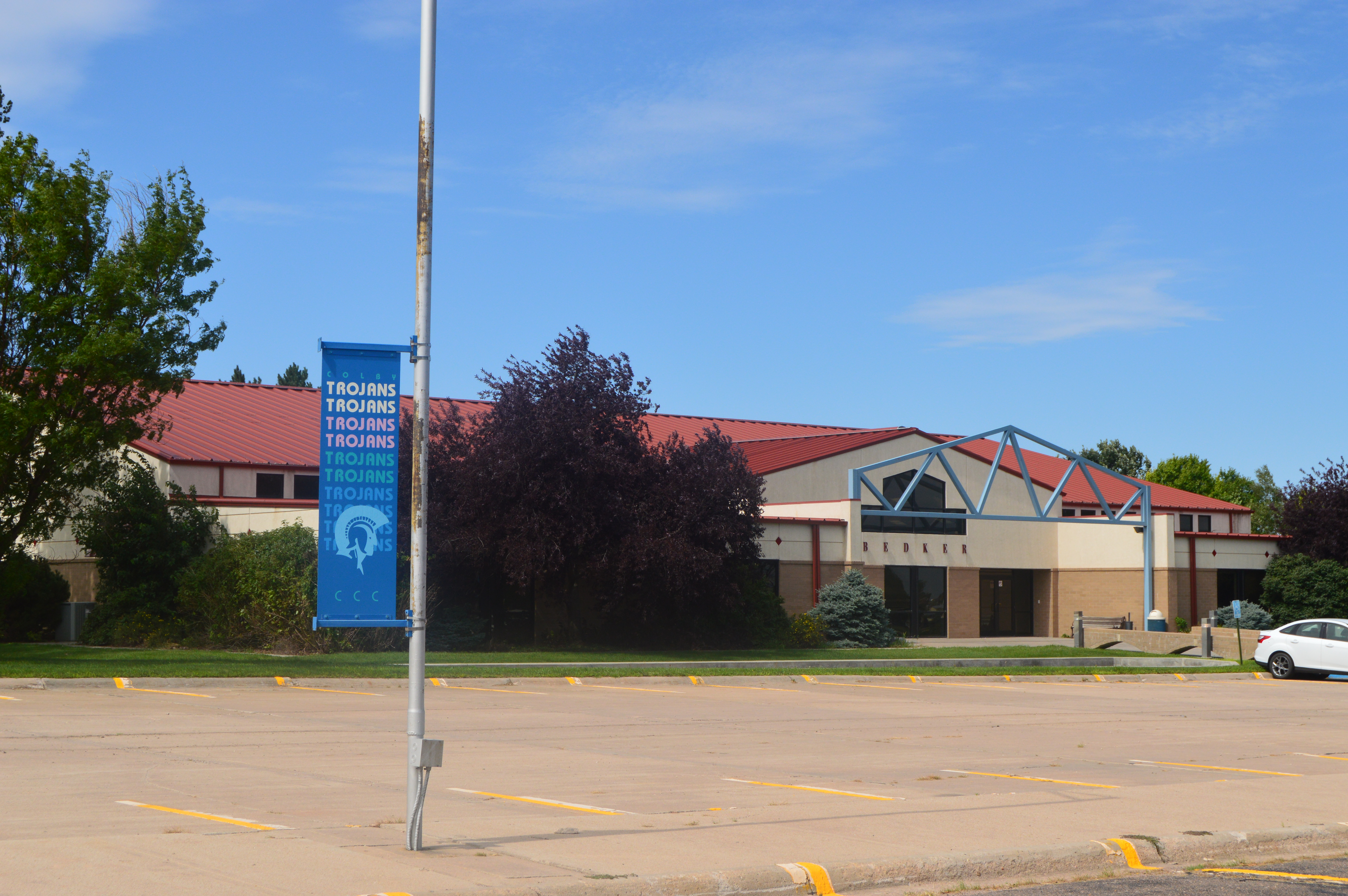
- Bedker Memorial Complex
- Motto: Challenge. Create. Connect.
- Type: Public community college
- Established: 1964
- President: Seth Carter
- Students: 1,375 (Fall 2023)
- Location: Colby, Kansas, U.S.
- Colors: Blue & white
- Nickname: Trojans
- Sporting affiliations: NJCAA Division I KJCCC
- Website: colbycc.edu

Colby Community College (CCC) is a public community college in Colby, Kansas. It was established in 1964 and has a 57-acre main campus in Colby with an additional 64-acre (26 ha) agricultural center east of the city.

The college is able to accommodate hundreds of off-campus students by offering classes in the 14-county service area, including a nursing campus in Norton, and through online distance education courses.

== Academics ==
Colby Community College offers more than 60 academic options which culminate in Associate of Arts, Associate of Science, and Associate of Applied Science degrees as well as certifications. Many of the programs and courses are offered in traditional and online learning environments.

== Athletics ==
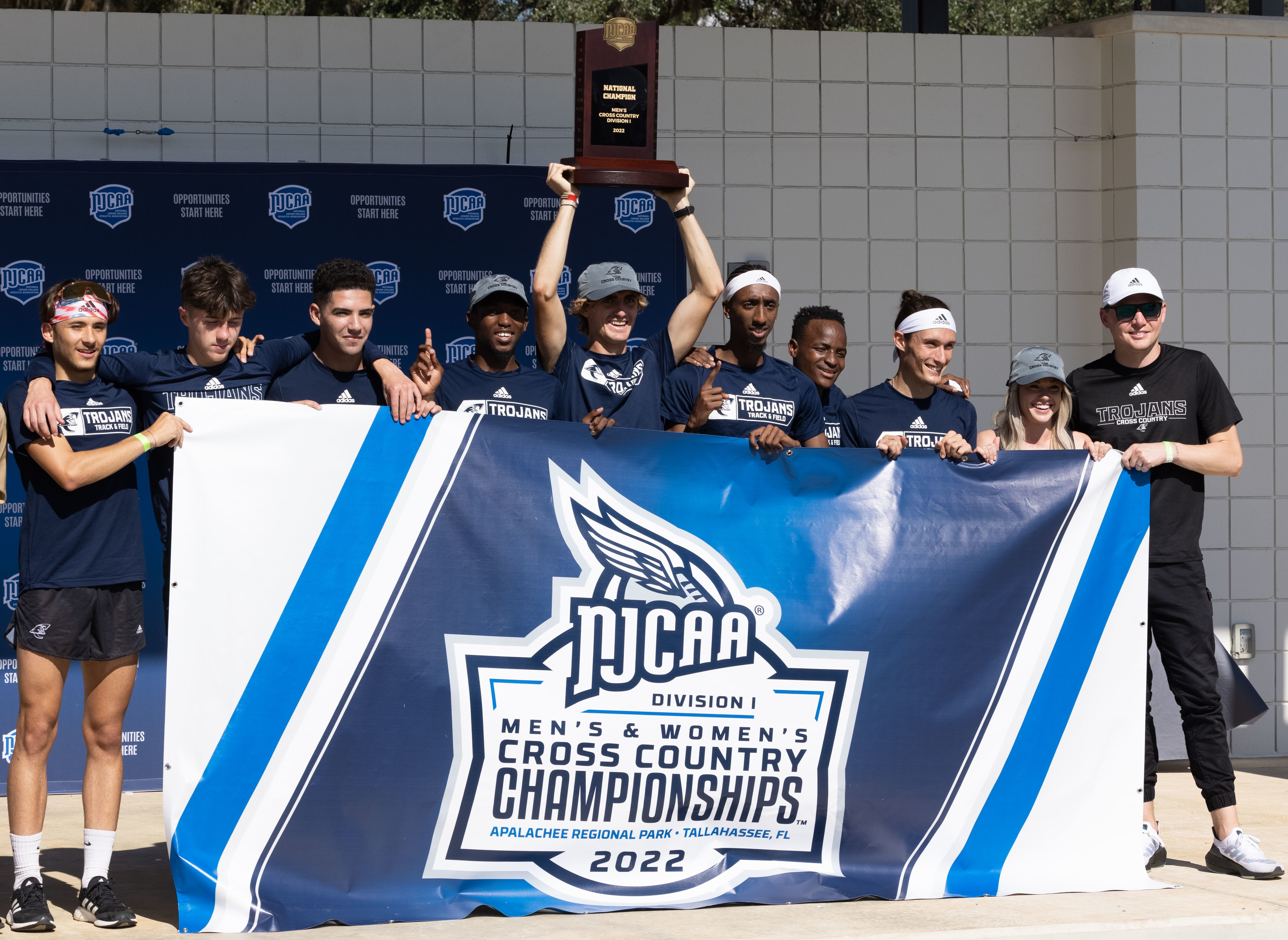
The Colby Trojans men's cross country team celebrating a national championship in 2022

The Colby Trojans are members of the Kansas Jayhawk Community College Conference. All nine of the competitive athletic teams are National Junior College Athletic Association Division I programs.

== Notable alumni ==
- Bekzod Abdurakhmonov – Olympic freestyle wrestler and mixed martial artist
- Jamie Adams – professional basketball player
- Daniel Cormier – Olympic freestyle wrestler and mixed martial artist
- C.B. Dollaway – collegiate wrestler and mixed martial artist
- Corey Hill – collegiate wrestler and mixed martial artist
- Mark Schultz – Contemporary Christian music artist
- Eric Sim – former professional baseball player in San Francisco Giants organization and YouTuber
- Brennan Ward – collegiate wrestler and mixed martial artist
