= Colby Trojans =

Sports teams of Colby Community College

- University: Colby Community College
- Association: NJCAA
- Conference: Kansas Jayhawk Community College Conference
- Athletic director: Kenny Hernandez
- Location: Colby, Kansas
- Varsity teams: 9
- Nickname: Trojans
- Colors: Navy and white
- Website: colbytrojans.com

The Colby Trojans are the sports teams of Colby Community College located in Colby, Kansas, United States. They participate in the National Junior College Athletic Association (NJCAA) and in the Kansas Jayhawk Community College Conference.

== Sports ==
Men's Sports

- Baseball
- Basketball
- Cross country
- Track & field
- Wrestling

Women's Sports

- Basketball
- Cross country
- Softball
- Track & field
- Volleyball

Additional teams

- Equestrian
- Livestock judging
- Rodeo
- Cheer and Dance Team
