= Cowley Tigers =

Sports teams of Cowley College in the US

- University: Cowley College
- Nickname: Tigers
- Association: NJCAA
- Conference: Kansas Jayhawk Community College Conference
- Athletic director: Jeff Fluty
- Location: Arkansas City, Kansas
- Varsity teams: 16
- Basketball arena: William S. Scott Auditorium
- Baseball stadium: Tiger Ball Park
- Softball stadium: Ed Hargrove Field
- Soccer stadium: Mark A Phillips Track and Field Complex
- Colors: Orange and Black
- Website: www.cowleytigers.com

The Cowley Tigers are the sport teams of Cowley College located in Arkansas City, Kansas, United States. They participate in the National Junior College Athletic Association and in the Kansas Jayhawk Community College Conference. The Cowley Tigers baseball team won two consecutive NJCAA World Series Championships in 1997 and 1998. The Cowley College volleyball team won the NJCAA DII National Championship in 2011, 2013, 2023, and 2024. Between 2023-2025, the Lady Tigers set a historic 104 match win streak along the way. The Tiger Cross Country teams have also enjoyed great success, winning a combined five national championships across both the men's and women's programs. The men's team captured national titles in 2010 (DI) and 2021 (DII), while the women's team won championships in 2010 (DI), 2020 (DII), and 2023 (DII). In addition, the Tigers have also excelled in the Half Marathon, earning three national championships. The men's team won the title in 2010, while the women's team secured back-to-back national championships in 2009 and 2010. Tiger Tennis have likewise enjoyed great success on the national stage, having won national titles for Men: 1989 (DII), 1991 (DII), and 2023 (DI) and for Women in 2024 (DI).

== Sports ==
Men's sports

- Baseball
- Basketball
- Cross country
- Soccer
- Tennis
- Track & field (indoor/outdoor)
- Wrestling

Women's sports

- Basketball
- Cross country
- Soccer
- Softball
- Tennis
- Track & field (indoor/outdoor)
- Volleyball

== Facilities ==
Cowley College has six athletics facilities (5 stadiums, 1 training facility).

- Hafner Training Center – training facility for all sports
- Ed Hargrove Field – home of the Lady Tigers softball team
- JC Louderback Tennis Center – home of the Tigers tennis teams
- Mark A. Phillips Track and Field Complex – home of the Tigers soccer and track & field teams
- Tiger Ball Park – home of the Tigers baseball team
- William S. Scott Auditorium – home of the Tigers men's and women's basketball and women's volleyball teams

== Notable persons ==
- Tyrus McGee (born 1991), basketball player in the Israel Basketball Premier League
