= Independence Pirates =

Intercollegiate sports teams of Independence Community College

- University: Independence Community College
- Nickname: Pirates
- Association: NJCAA
- Conference: Kansas Jayhawk Community College Conference
- Athletic director: Melissa Anderson
- Location: Independence, Kansas
- Varsity teams: 5 (2 men's, 3 women's)
- Football stadium: Emmot Field
- Basketball arena: Fieldhouse
- Colors: Navy blue and Vegas gold
- Website: www.indypirates.com

The Independence Community College Pirates are the sports teams of Independence Community College located in Independence, Kansas, United States. They participate in the NJCAA and in the Kansas Jayhawk Community College Conference. The men's football team was featured on the third and fourth seasons of the television documentary Last Chance U.

== Sports ==
Men's sports

- Basketball
- Football

Women's sports

- Basketball
- Softball
- Volleyball

== Facilities ==
Independence Community College has six athletics facilities.

- Emmot Field – home of the Pirates football team
- Fieldhouse – home of the Pirates men's and women's basketball teams, and the volleyball team
- Volunteer Field – home of the Lady Pirates softball team

== Notable alumni ==
- Tank Dell, NFL wide receiver, Houston Texans
- Armen Gilliam, former NBA player
- Harvey Grant, former NBA player
- Malik Henry, CFL quarterback
- William Inge, playwright and novelist
- Bobby Johnson, former NFL wide receiver, New York Giants
- Jermaine Johnson II, NFL defensive end
- Emmanuel Lamur, Former NFL linebacker, Cincinnati Bengals
- Bruce McCray, NFL defensive back
- Dishon McNary, CFL defensive back
- Ron Parker, NFL cornerback, Kansas City Chiefs
- Allen Patrick, NFL running back
- Ruben Patterson, former basketball player
- Tarik Phillip (born 1993), British-American basketball player in the Israel Basketball Premier League
- Reggie Rembert, former NFL wide receiver, Cincinnati Bengals, New York Jets
- Antwoine Sanders, former football safety
- Brad Underwood, men's basketball coach, Illinois, Oklahoma State, Stephen F. Austin
- Ron Warner, former NFL defensive end, New Orleans Saints, Tampa Bay Buccaneers and Washington Redskins
