= Labette Cardinals =

- University: Labette Community College
- Association: NJCAA
- Conference: Kansas Jayhawk Community College Conference
- Athletic director: Aaron Keal
- Location: Parsons, Kansas
- Varsity teams: 6
- Nickname: Cardinals
- Colors: White and Red
- Website: www.labette.edu/athletics

The Labette Cardinals are the sports teams of Labette Community College located in Parsons, Kansas. They participate the NJCAA and in the Kansas Jayhawk Community College Conference.

== Sports ==
Men's sports

- Baseball
- Basketball
- Spirit Squad
- Wrestling

Women's sports

- Basketball
- Spirit Squad
- Softball
- Volleyball
