= Dodge City Community College =

Community college in Dodge City, Kansas, U.S.

- Motto: In Quest of Truth
- Type: Public community college
- Established: 1935
- President: Harold E. Nolte, Jr.
- Students: 1,737 (Fall 2023)
- Location: Dodge City, Kansas, United States; 37.7768°N 100.0374°W
- Colors: Purple & gold
- Nickname: Conquistadors (Conqs)
- Sporting affiliations: NJCAA – KJCCA
- Website: www.dc3.edu

Dodge City Community College (DC3, DCCC) is a public community college in Dodge City, Kansas, United States.

== History ==
=== Campus ===
Founded in 1935, Dodge City Community College was located on the third floor of the Senior High School Building at 1601 First Avenue, for 22 years. By 1957, it had grown large enough to require a move to a different location, at 1000 N. Second Avenue. The college remained there for the next 13 years. In 1965, the Kansas Legislature passed legislation changing control of the state's junior colleges from the State Board of Education to locally elected Boards. Kansas junior colleges became genuine community colleges, answerable to the citizens in their areas. Ford County voted overwhelmingly to assume responsibility for the college, and in the fall of 1965, the county elected its first board of trustees. In the fall of 1966, the Student Affairs Division was first established. The Student Affairs encompassed counseling, records and admission, student housing, campus activities, and recreation activities. In October 1966, due to overcrowded classrooms and the increasing need for additional occupational programs, the citizens of Ford County endorsed a $2.5 million bond. In 1970, DC3 opened its 35th year of operation with a new campus, located on the northwest edge of the city. The college's outstanding design was recognized with an award by the American Institute of Architects. The campus sits on the former site of the James Mooney Ranch. The land was purchased in 1966 from Mr. Mooney.

== Campus ==
The campus encompasses 145 acres (0.59 km^{2}), 20 buildings, a fishing lake, a 1.25-mile (2.01 km) fitness trail, basketball, tennis and racquetball courts, and a rodeo arena.

The Student Union is the heart of the campus. It contains Student Services, the Testing Center, the Conq Corral snack bar, the ConqShop Bookstore, the Student Government Association office, and the President's Office.

The Library contains 30,000 volumes of print material, 200 periodicals, a Federal Documents Depository, electronic reference materials, and has access to over 2.5 million titles and 50,000 periodical titles through networking with other Kansas libraries. Access to over 24 million titles in 71,000 libraries in 112 countries is also available by participation in OCLC (Online Computer Library Center), a non-profit computer library service and research organization dedicated to the public purposes of furthering access to the world's information and reducing the rate of rise of library costs. Internet access is available to online reference material and university libraries' catalogs worldwide. The college's television station is located on the second floor. The college archives is also located in the Library. It is the repository for material related to the history of DC3, including yearbooks, newspapers, flyers, programs, and other historical items.

The Cosmetology/Child Care Building contains the cosmetology program and Cosmetology Salon. The Salon is designed as a laboratory experience for cosmetology students, and is open to the public on a limited basis.

Lake Charles, named after former college president Charles Barnes, is a 1½ acre, 12-foot-deep (3.7 m) community fishing lake. The lake remains full with water pumped into it by the college. It is stocked with channel catfish, crappie, largemouth bass, trout, and bluegill. Its location is 37.7753°N 100.0392°W.

The Little Theatre holds campus performances, special cultural events, lectures, student musical performances, and community meetings. It has a proscenium stage and holds 357 spectators. DC3's Art Gallery is located in the Theatre's lobby.

The Wellness Center, located on the lower level of the Athletics building, is used by students, staff, and community members. The center offers free weights, stationary bikes, rowing machines, Nordic-Trak ski machine, treadmills, step machines, and aerobic riders. Staff offer individually designed exercise prescriptions, fitness evaluations, body composition analysis, and exercise programs for senior citizens.

DC3 is only one of a handful of community colleges in the country to own and operate an electron microscope; it is located in the Science and Math building.

DC3 has four residence halls: Becker, Shelden, Coleman-Webb, and Jackson. These are usually separated into all-male or all-female residence halls. Becker and Shelden have the same floor plan. Coleman-Webb has two single rooms connected via a bathroom. Jackson Hall is suite style, thus two single rooms share a common space.

Security for the campus and residence halls is present 24 hours a day, 7 days a week. Staff consists of full-time officers, part-time officers, and student cadets.

== Student activities ==
The college's Student Government Association is an active part of the student body. It is composed of four student body-elected officers, elected representatives from each campus club, and other interested students. Student Government Association members, who sit on numerous College committees, promote students' opinions on college policies, development of student activities, and development of the college as an institution.

Phi Theta Kappa, the international honor society for two-year college students, has an active Kappa Psi chapter on campus. Its mission is recognizing and encouraging student scholarship, leadership, fellowship, and community service. To be eligible for membership, a student must complete a minimum of 12 hours of associate degree coursework and earn a GPA of 3.5 or higher. Students must maintain a high academic standing throughout their enrollment in the two-year college, which usually means a 3.25 GPA.

International Student Organization offers an opportunity to students of all ethnic origins, especially foreign born, to contribute their ideas and culture to DC3. Some of its fellowship and service activities include guest lectures, field trips, and co-sponsorship of various ethnic day celebrations. This club provides social enrichment for members and non-members and promotes awareness of cultural diversity among all students.

== Media ==
The Conquistador is the official magazine of DC3, and it is published once per semester by the Office of Marketing and Public Relations. Print copies are available on campus, and digital copies are available at www.dc3.edu under the "Media" tab.

The Golden Shield yearbook was published annually from 1966 to 1991 by the college's journalism classes. After a 34-year absence, the Golden Shield returned in 2025 with a full-color hardcover yearbook, which is now published by the college's Office of Marketing and Public Relations. Print copies are available for purchase, and digital copies are available at www.dc3.edu under the "Media" tab.

== Athletics ==
The Conqs are members of the Kansas Jayhawk Community College Conference. The men's basketball team has won one national junior college championship. Men's sports include baseball, basketball, cross country, football, golf, rodeo, soccer, and track & field. Women's sports include basketball, cross country, golf, rodeo, soccer, softball, track & field, volleyball, and cheer and dance squads.

== Notable alumni ==
- Ross Bjork, college athletics director
- Nola Ochs, formerly the world's oldest college graduate, 2007 Kansas Woman Leader of the Year, and oldest Phi Theta Kappa member
- Darrin Simmons, professional football coach
- Steve Tasker, professional football player
- Larry Brown (running back), professional football player
