= Johnson County Cavaliers =

Intercollegiate sports teams of Johnson County Community College

- University: Johnson County Community College
- Association: NJCAA
- Conference: Kansas Jayhawk Community College Conference
- Athletic director: Tony Tompkins
- Location: Overland Park, Kansas
- Varsity teams: 7
- Basketball arena: Gym building
- Baseball stadium: Baseball field
- Softball stadium: Softball field
- Soccer stadium: Soccer field
- Nickname: Cavaliers
- Colors: Navy and gold
- Mascot: Jean Claude Cavalier
- Website: www.jccc.edu/cavs/

The Johnson County Community College Cavaliers are the sports teams of Johnson County Community College located in Overland Park, Kansas, United States. They participate in the NJCAA and in the Kansas Jayhawk Community College Conference.

== Sports ==
Men's sports

- Baseball
- Basketball
- Soccer

Women's sports

- Basketball
- Soccer
- Softball
- Volleyball

=== National championships ===
The Johnson County Cavaliers have won 10 national titles since 1993.

National title seasons
Season	Sport
1993	Women's marathon
2000	Women's basketball
2000	Women's cross country
2001	Men's basketball
2003	Women's half-marathon
2005	Women's half-marathon
2005	Volleyball
2006	Women's half-marathon
2008	Women's half-marathon
2009	Men's basketball
2015	Women's basketball
2020	Volleyball

== Overview ==
- 12 national championships
- 21 runner-up national finishes
- 99 top 5 national finishes
- 142 region titles
- 183 conference titles
- More than 1,000 NJCAA All-America Athletes
- 74 individual national champions
- More than 500 NJCAA All-Academic Athletes

== Facilities ==
Johnson County Community College has four athletics facilities.

- Baseball stadium
- Gym building (basketball)
- Soccer field
- Softball stadium

== Notable alumni ==
- Tony Harris, former basketball player in the National Basketball Association (NBA) and in leagues in the Philippines, Venezuela, Cyprus, Spain, and Greece
- Kit Pellow, baseball player in Major League Baseball (MLB) for the Kansas City Royals and Colorado Rockies, in the KBO League for the Lotte Giants, and in the Chinese Professional Baseball League (CPBL) for the La New Bears
