= Johnson County Community College =

Public college in Overland Park, Kansas, US

- Motto: Changing lives through learning.
- Type: Public community college
- Established: 1969
- Students: 18,768 (fall 2024)
- Location: Overland Park, Kansas, United States; 38.9257°N 94.7279°W
- Colors: Navy and gold
- Nickname: Cavaliers
- Sporting affiliations: NJCAA – Kansas Jayhawk Community College Conference
- Website: jccc.edu

Johnson County Community College (JCCC) is a public community college in Overland Park, Kansas, which is in Johnson County.

== History ==
Johnson County Community College Student Center

In 1963, Johnson County Commissioners, recognizing the emerging community college movement and seeking to accommodate the rapidly growing population of Johnson County, Kansas, formed a committee to examine the feasibility of forming such an institution in Johnson County.

The college was formally established following a successful county-wide election held in March 1967. The main campus site at College Boulevard and Quivira Road was selected in 1969 after Johnson County voters approved $12.9 million in bonds to purchase 200 acres of land in Overland Park, with classes beginning in leased facilities in Merriam, Kansas, that same year. Construction of the main campus began in 1970, and classes and operations were moved to the new campus in the fall of 1972.

In 1981, the college completed construction of the Arts and Technology Building, and established a railroad training center in partnership with the Burlington Northern Santa Fe Railway (BNSF) in 1989. The Cultural Education Center, now the Midwest Trust Center, opened in 1990. In the early 2000s, the college added a three-story Student Center for administrative and counseling services, and, in 2007, the college opened the Regnier Center and the 41,000-square-foot Nerman Museum of Contemporary Art. Galileo's Pavilion, an environmentally friendly building, opened in 2012. Later additions included Galileo's Pavilion in 2012, the Wylie Hospitality and Culinary Academy in 2013, the Fine Arts and Design Studios, and the Hugh Libby Career and Technical Education Center.

In 2010, four student nurses in JCCC's nursing program were expelled after posing for photographs with a human placenta during an off-site lab session and posting an image to Facebook. During the lab, a student asked for permission to take the photos for social media; the instructor responded, "Oh, you girls," which the students interpreted as consent, while the college later characterized the act as a breach of professional conduct. One student filed a federal lawsuit against the college, alleging a lack of due process and noting that the school's code of conduct did not specifically prohibit such photography. In January 2011, US District Court Judge Eric Melgren ruled in favor of the student, finding that the instructor's ambiguous response did not constitute a clear prohibition and that no patient privacy was violated since the placenta was non-identifiable. The court ordered JCCC to reinstate the students, concluding that the college failed to provide due process before they expelled the students.

== Academics ==
JCCC offers a range of undergraduate credit courses that form the first two years of most college curricula. JCCC has an open-admissions policy.

The school offers student clubs, study-abroad programs, a police academy, agriculture school, a theater arts program and much more. Billington Library is the most notable library at the school, with a collection of books and technology for all students and community members to use.

== Administration ==
The Performing Arts Center

JCCC is governed by a seven-member board of trustees elected at-large from the community to four-year terms. The board governs the college and sets the budget and local tax levy. Every other year, in odd calendar years, three trustees face re-election.

== Athletics ==
The Johnson County Community College Cavaliers are the sports teams of Johnson County Community College located in Overland Park, Kansas, United States. They participate in the NJCAA and in the Kansas Jayhawk Community College Conference.

== Notable alumni ==
- Sharice Davids, politician
- Tony Harris, professional basketball player
- Heather Meyer, politician
- Kit Pellow, professional baseball player
- Kevin Rathbun, chef
- Ed Wildberger, politician
