= Kansas Jayhawk Community College Conference =

Athletic conference in the US

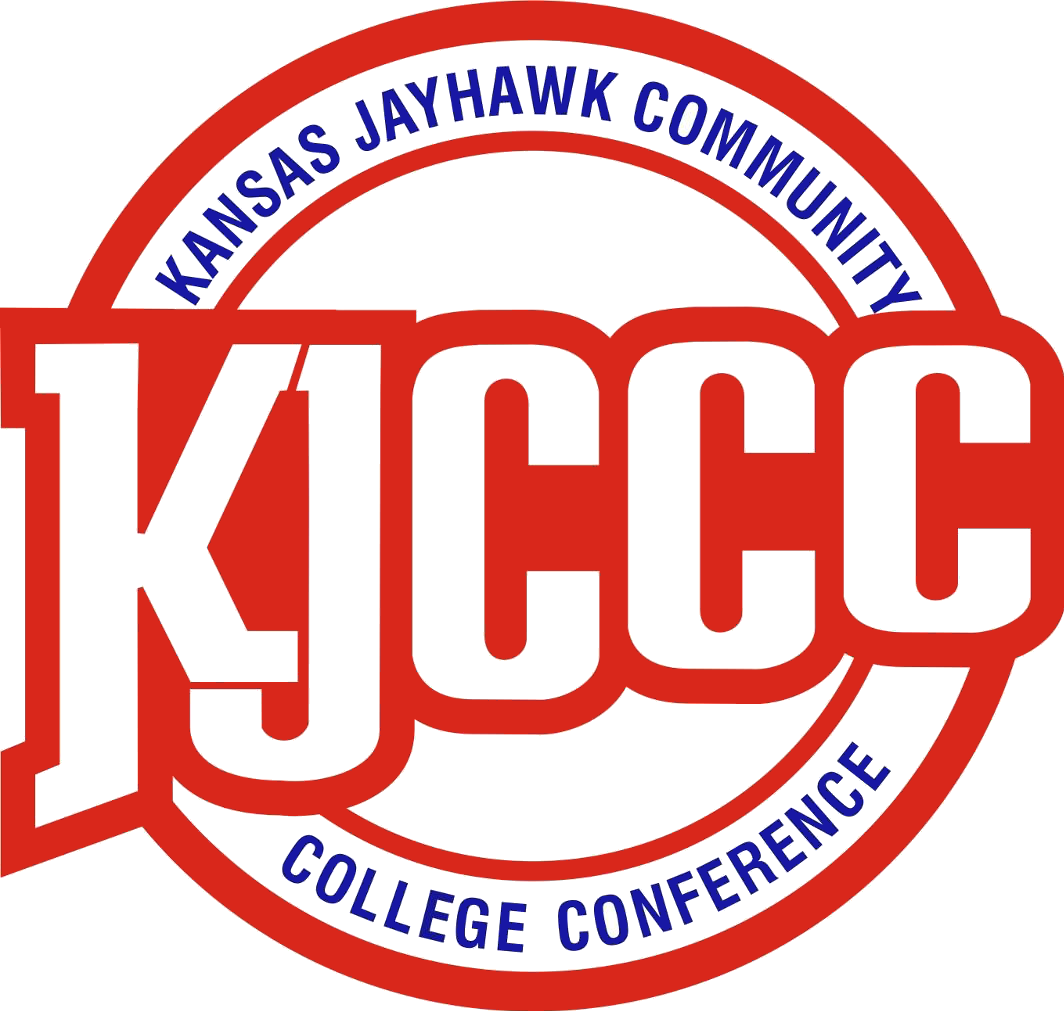
- Formerly: Kansas Public Junior College Association (1923–1962); Kansas Jayhawk Junior College Conference (1962–1975)
- Association: NJCAA
- Founded: 1923
- Commissioner: Mike Saddler
- Sports fielded: 19; men's: 9; women's: 10
- Division: Region 6
- No. of teams: 20
- Headquarters: Colby, Kansas
- Region: Kansas
- Official website: www.kjccc.org

Locations
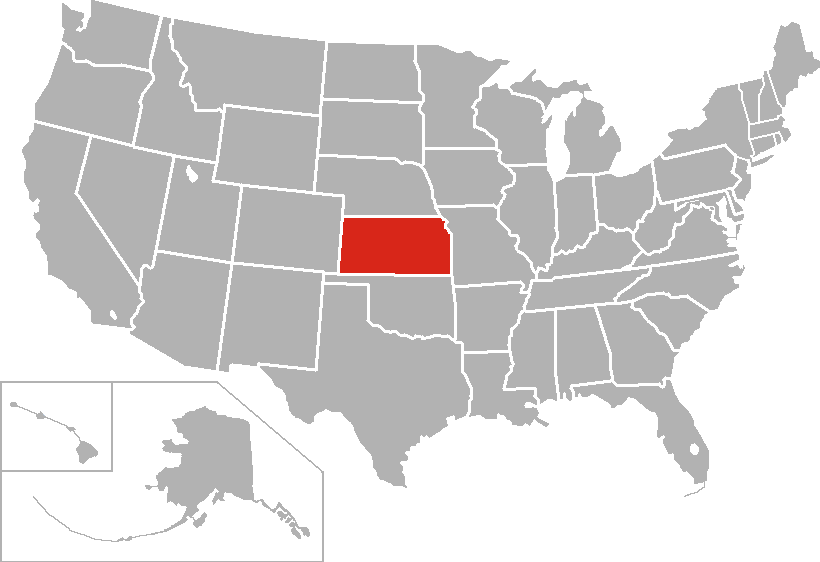

The Kansas Jayhawk Community College Conference (KJCCC) is a college athletic conference that is a member of the National Junior College Athletic Association (NJCAA). As of 2007, the KJCCC was home to more than 3,000 student-athletes in the 19 men's and women's sports. The conference's name comes from "Jayhawk" which is a term used for people born in the state of Kansas, where all of the conference's schools are located. The term Jayhawk, however, originated with a group of anti-slavery guerrillas during the American Civil War.

== Member schools ==
=== Current members ===
The KJCCC currently has 19 full members. All KJCCC schools which compete in football, wrestling, track and field, and cross country do so at the Division I level. Independence and Fort Hays Tech Northwest are the only members that do not field a baseball team. In other sports, the schools are split between Division I and Division II status.

Institution	Location (Note: All locations are within the State of Kansas.)	Founded	Affiliation	Enrollment	Nickname	Joined	Colors	Division
Allen Community College (Note: Member institution is a Division II school in basketball, volleyball and softball.)	Iola	1923	Public (Note: Part of the Kansas Board of Regents System.)	2,385	Red Devils	1923		Eastern
Barton Community College (Note: Member institution is a Division I school in basketball, volleyball and softball.)	Great Bend	1969	Public	6,281	Cougars	1969		Western
Butler Community College	El Dorado	1927	Public	7,019	Grizzlies	1927		Western
Cloud County Community College (Note: Member institution is a Division I school in basketball, and a Division II member in volleyball and softball.)	Concordia	1965	Public	3,437	Thunderbirds	1996		Western
Coffeyville Community College	Coffeyville	1923	Public	1,772	Red Ravens	1923		Eastern
Colby Community College	Colby	1964	Public	?	Trojans	?		Western
Cowley College	Arkansas City	1922	Public	?	Tigers	1924		Eastern
Dodge City Community College	Dodge City	1935	Public	?	Conquistadors	1936		Western
Fort Hays Tech Northwest	Goodland	1964	Public	?	Tigers	2017		Western
Fort Scott Community College	Fort Scott	1919	Public	2,000	Greyhounds	1923/1962		Eastern
Garden City Community College	Garden City	1919	Public	2,122	Broncbusters	1924		Western
Highland Community College	Highland	1858	Public	?	Scotties	1970/1996		Eastern
Hutchinson Community College	Hutchinson	1928	Public	5,114	Blue Dragons	1929		Western
Independence Community College (Note: Member institution is a Division I school in basketball and softball, and a Division II member in volleyball.)	Independence	1925	Public	1,133	Pirates	1925		Eastern
Johnson County Community College	Overland Park	1967	Public	16,651	Cavaliers	?		Eastern
Kansas City Kansas Community College	Kansas City	1923	Public	4,886	Blue Devils	1925		Eastern
Labette Community College	Parsons	1923	Public	?	Cardinals	1923		Eastern
Neosho County Community College	Chanute	1936	Public	?	Panthers	1936		Eastern
Pratt Community College	Pratt	1938	Public	?	Beavers	1939		Western
Seward County Community College	Liberal	1969	Public	2,692	Saints	?		Western

== Football ==
Only seven of the schools have football: Butler, Coffeyville, Dodge City, Garden City, Hutchinson, Highland, and Independence. The conference is not divided into divisions for football. Fort Scott terminated its football program on Nov. 8, 2021.

From 2000 through the 2013 season, the regular-season champion was considered the Jayhawk Conference champion while the playoff champion was considered the Region VI champion. Prior to the 2014 season, the playoffs were eliminated from the schedule so that each Jayhawk Conference team could play a game versus each football-playing school in Iowa. The Jayhawk Conference regular-season champion is now also the Region 6 champion.

The Independence Pirates football team was featured on the third and fourth seasons of the television documentary "Last Chance U" and consequently multiple games of the conference were featured on the documentary.

=== Yearly standings ===
1941 Kansas Junior College Conference football standings
	Conf.					Overall
Team	W		L		T	W		L		T
Coffeyville $	7	–	0	–	0	?	–	?	–	?
Iola	7	–	1	–	1	?	–	?	–	?
Independence	5	–	1	–	1	?	–	?	–	?
El Dorado	6	–	2	–	0	?	–	?	–	?
Chanute	4	–	3	–	0	?	–	?	–	?
Dodge City	2	–	2	–	0	?	–	?	–	?
Fort Scott	2	–	5	–	0	?	–	?	–	?
Hutchinson	2	–	5	–	0	3	–	5	–	0
Pratt	1	–	3	–	1	?	–	?	–	?
Arkansas City	1	–	4	–	1	?	–	?	–	?
Kansas City (KS)	0	–	3	–	0	?	–	?	–	?
Parsons (KS)	0	–	8	–	0	?	–	?	–	?
$ – Conference champion

1970 Kansas Jayhawk Junior College Conference football standings
	Conf.					Overall
Team	W		L		T	W		L		T
Fort Scott $	8	–	0	–	0	11	–	0	–	0
Hutchinson	7	–	1	–	0	9	–	1	–	1
Garden City	6	–	2	–	0	7	–	3	–	0
Pratt	5	–	3	–	0	6	–	4	–	0
Cowley County	4	–	4	–	0	6	–	4	–	0
Butler County	3	–	5	–	0	4	–	6	–	0
Independence	1	–	7	–	0	2	–	8	–	0
Highland (KS)	1	–	7	–	0	1	–	8	–	0
Coffeyville	1	–	7	–	0	1	–	9	–	0
Dodge City *	0	–	0	–	0	4	–	5	–	0
$ – Conference champion; * Dodge City was on probation.

1987 Kansas Jayhawk Community College Conference football standings
	Conf.					Overall
Team	W		L		T	W		L		T
Independence †	6	–	0	–	0	8	–	3	–	0
Coffeyville †	5	–	1	–	0	8	–	2	–	0
Butler County †y$	4	–	2	–	0	8	–	4	–	0
Garden City †y	3	–	3	–	0	7	–	4	–	0
Hutchinson	2	–	4	–	0	4	–	4	–	0
Dodge City	1	–	5	–	0	3	–	6	–	0
Fort Scott	0	–	6	–	0	3	–	6	–	0
Championship: Butler County 17, Garden City 16
$ – Conference champion; † – Conference playoff participant; y – Championship game participant

1988 Kansas Jayhawk Community College Conference football standings
	Conf.					Overall
Team	W		L		T	W		L		T
Coffeyville †y	6	–	0	–	0	9	–	1	–	1
Butler County †	3	–	3	–	0	5	–	5	–	0
Garden City †y$	3	–	3	–	0	7	–	4	–	0
Independence †	3	–	3	–	0	3	–	6	–	0
Fort Scott	2	–	4	–	0	5	–	4	–	0
Dodge City	2	–	4	–	0	3	–	5	–	0
Hutchinson	2	–	4	–	0	3	–	6	–	0
Championship: Garden City 21, Coffeyville 16
$ – Conference champion; † – Conference playoff participant; y – Championship game participant

1989 Kansas Jayhawk Community College Conference football standings
	Conf.					Overall
Team	W		L		T	W		L		T
Garden City †y	6	–	0	–	0	10	–	2	–	0
Coffeyville †	5	–	1	–	0	6	–	3	–	0
Butler County †y$	4	–	2	–	0	10	–	2	–	0
Fort Scott	2	–	4	–	0	5	–	4	–	0
Independence †	2	–	4	–	0	5	–	5	–	0
Dodge City	1	–	5	–	0	2	–	7	–	0
Hutchinson	1	–	5	–	0	1	–	8	–	0
Championship: Butler County 28, Garden City 20
$ – Conference champion; † – Conference playoff participant; y – Championship game participant

1990 Kansas Jayhawk Community College Conference football standings
	Conf.					Overall
Team	W		L		T	W		L		T
Coffeyville †y$	6	–	0	–	0	11	–	0	–	0
Garden City †	5	–	1	–	0	8	–	3	–	0
Butler County †y	3	–	3	–	0	8	–	4	–	0
Fort Scott †	3	–	3	–	0	6	–	5	–	0
Independence	2	–	4	–	0	4	–	5	–	0
Dodge City	1	–	5	–	0	2	–	7	–	0
Hutchinson	1	–	5	–	0	1	–	8	–	0
KJCCC championship: Coffeyville 27, Butler County 21
$ – Conference champion; † – Conference playoff participant; y – Championship game participant

1991 Kansas Jayhawk Community College Conference football standings
	Conf.					Overall
Team	W		L		T	W		L		T
Garden City †y$	4	–	1	–	1	8	–	3	–	1
Coffeyville †y	4	–	1	–	1	6	–	3	–	1
Butler County †	4	–	2	–	0	7	–	3	–	0
Fort Scott †	4	–	2	–	0	7	–	4	–	0
Dodge City	3	–	3	–	0	4	–	5	–	0
Hutchinson	1	–	5	–	0	3	–	6	–	0
Independence	0	–	6	–	0	2	–	7	–	0
Championship: Garden City 25, Coffeyville 20
$ – Conference champion; † – Conference playoff participant; y – Championship game participant

1992 Kansas Jayhawk Community College Conference football standings
	Conf.					Overall
Team	W		L		T	W		L		T
Coffeyville †y	5	–	1	–	0	7	–	4	–	0
Garden City †y$	4	–	2	–	0	9	–	3	–	0
Fort Scott †	4	–	2	–	0	8	–	4	–	0
Dodge City †	3	–	2	–	1	6	–	5	–	1
Hutchinson †	2	–	3	–	1	5	–	4	–	1
Butler County †	2	–	4	–	0	4	–	6	–	0
Independence †	0	–	6	–	0	1	–	9	–	0
Championship: Garden City 26, Coffeyville 0
$ – Conference champion; † – Conference playoff participant; y – Championship game participant

1993 Kansas Jayhawk Community College Conference football standings
	Conf.					Overall
Team	W		L		T	W		L		T
Coffeyville †y	5	–	1	–	0	9	–	2	–	0
Butler County †y$	4	–	1	–	1	9	–	2	–	1
Hutchinson †	4	–	2	–	0	6	–	4	–	0
Garden City †	3	–	3	–	0	5	–	5	–	0
Fort Scott †	2	–	3	–	1	4	–	4	–	1
Independence †	2	–	4	–	0	4	–	5	–	0
Dodge City †	0	–	6	–	0	1	–	8	–	0
Championship: Butler County 42, Coffeyville 26
$ – Conference champion; † – Conference playoff participant; y – Championship game participant

1994 Kansas Jayhawk Community College Conference football standings
	Conf.					Overall
Team	W		L		T	W		L		T
Garden City †y$	6	–	0	–	0	10	–	1	–	0
Hutchinson †y	5	–	1	–	0	8	–	4	–	0
Fort Scott †	3	–	3	–	0	5	–	5	–	0
Coffeyville †	3	–	3	–	0	4	–	5	–	0
Independence †	2	–	4	–	0	5	–	5	–	0
Butler County †	2	–	4	–	0	3	–	6	–	0
Dodge City †	0	–	6	–	0	0	–	9	–	0
Championship: Garden City 49, Hutchinson 26
$ – Conference champion; † – Conference playoff participant; y – Championship game participant

1995 Kansas Jayhawk Community College Conference football standings
	Conf.					Overall
Team	W		L		T	W		L		T
Hutchinson †y$	5	–	1	–	0	10	–	2	–	0
Garden City †y	5	–	1	–	0	9	–	2	–	0
Coffeyville †	4	–	1	–	1	6	–	3	–	1
Fort Scott †	2	–	3	–	1	5	–	4	–	1
Independence †	2	–	4	–	0	5	–	4	–	0
Butler County †	1	–	5	–	0	1	–	8	–	0
Dodge City †	1	–	5	–	0	1	–	8	–	0
Championship: Hutchinson 34, Garden City 22
$ – Conference champion; † – Conference playoff participant; y – Championship game participant; ^ – KJCCC playoff participant

1996 Kansas Jayhawk Community College Conference football standings
	Conf.					Overall
Team	W		L		T	W		L		T
Garden City †y	6	–	1	–	0	10	–	2	–	0
Coffeyville †y$	6	–	1	–	0	9	–	2	–	0
Hutchinson †	5	–	2	–	0	7	–	3	–	0
Butler County †	5	–	2	–	0	7	–	4	–	0
Fort Scott †	3	–	4	–	0	3	–	6	–	0
Independence †	2	–	5	–	0	3	–	6	–	0
Highland (KS) †	1	–	7	–	0	2	–	7	–	0
Dodge City †	0	–	7	–	0	0	–	9	–	0
Championship: Coffeyville 42, Garden City 35
$ – Conference champion; † – Conference playoff participant; y – Championship game participant; ^ – KJCCC playoff participant

1997 Kansas Jayhawk Community College Conference football standings
	Conf.					Overall
Team	W		L		T	W		L		T
Garden City †y$	6	–	1	–	0	10	–	2	–	0
Coffeyville †y	6	–	1	–	0	9	–	3	–	0
Hutchinson †	4	–	3	–	0	6	–	4	–	0
Independence †	4	–	3	–	0	6	–	4	–	0
Butler County †	4	–	3	–	0	4	–	5	–	0
Dodge City †	2	–	5	–	0	3	–	6	–	0
Fort Scott †	2	–	5	–	0	2	–	7	–	0
Highland (KS) †	0	–	7	–	0	1	–	8	–	0
Championship: Garden City 31, Coffeyville 30
$ – Conference champion; † – Conference playoff participant; y – Championship game participant; ^ – KJCCC playoff participant

1998 Kansas Jayhawk Community College Conference football standings
	Conf.					Overall
Team		W		L			W		L
Butler County †y$	7	–	0	–	0	12	–	0	–	0
Garden City †y	5	–	2	–	0	9	–	3	–	0
Coffeyville †	5	–	2	–	0	6	–	4	–	0
Hutchinson †	4	–	3	–	0	6	–	4	–	0
Independence †	3	–	4	–	0	3	–	5	–	0
Highland (KS) †	2	–	5	–	0	3	–	6	–	0
Fort Scott †	1	–	6	–	2	0	–	7	–	0
Dodge City †	1	–	6	–	0	1	–	8	–	0
Championship: Butler County 24, Garden City 13
$ – Conference champion; † – Conference playoff participant; y – Championship game participant

1999 Kansas Jayhawk Community College Conference football standings
	Conf.					Overall
Team		W		L			W		L
Garden City †y	7	–	0	–	0	10	–	2	–	0
Butler County †y$	6	–	1	–	0	11	–	1	–	0
Hutchinson †	5	–	2	–	0	8	–	3	–	0
Fort Scott †	4	–	3	–	0	5	–	5	–	0
Coffeyville †	3	–	4	–	0	5	–	5	–	0
Highland (KS) †	2	–	5	–	0	3	–	6	–	0
Dodge City †	1	–	6	–	0	1	–	8	–	0
Independence †	0	–	7	–	0	0	–	9	–	0
Championship: Butler County 37, Garden City 34
$ – Conference champion; y – Championship game participant

2007 Kansas Jayhawk Community College Conference football standings
	Conf.			Overall
Team	W		L	W		L
Butler (KS) †y$	7	–	0	12	–	0
Fort Scott †y	6	–	1	9	–	3
Garden City †	5	–	2	7	–	3
Coffeyville †	4	–	3	5	–	5
Hutchinson	2	–	5	2	–	7
Independence	2	–	5	2	–	7
Dodge City	1	–	6	1	–	8
Highland (KS)	1	–	6	1	–	8
Championship: Butler (KS) 35, Fort Scott 22
$ – Conference champion; † – Conference playoff participant; y – Championship game participant

2008 Kansas Jayhawk Community College Conference football standings
	Conf.			Overall
Team	W		L	W		L
Butler (KS) †y$	7	–	0	11	–	1
Fort Scott †	6	–	1	9	–	2
Hutchinson †y	4	–	3	7	–	4
Garden City †	4	–	3	6	–	4
Coffeyville	2	–	5	3	–	6
Independence	2	–	5	2	–	7
Dodge City	2	–	5	2	–	7
Highland (KS)	1	–	6	1	–	8
Championship: Butler (KS) 29, Hutchinson 14
$ – Conference champion; † – Conference playoff participant; y – Championship game participant

2010 Kansas Jayhawk Community College Conference football standings
	Conf.			Overall
Team	W		L	W		L
Butler (KS) †y$	7	–	0	11	–	1
Hutchinson †y	6	–	1	10	–	2
Coffeyville †	4	–	3	6	–	5
Independence †	4	–	3	4	–	6
Fort Scott	3	–	4	3	–	6
Garden City	2	–	5	3	–	6
Highland (KS)	2	–	5	2	–	7
Dodge City	0	–	7	0	–	9
Championship: Butler (KS) 48, Hutchinson 0
$ – Conference champion; † – Conference playoff participant; y – Championship game participant

2011 Kansas Jayhawk Community College Conference football standings
	Conf.			Overall
Team	W		L	W		L
Butler (KS) †y$	6	–	0	11	–	1
Hutchinson †y	5	–	1	9	–	3
Coffeyville †	4	–	2	6	–	4
Dodge City †	3	–	3	3	–	7
Garden City	2	–	4	2	–	7
Highland (KS)	1	–	5	1	–	8
Independence	0	–	6	0	–	9
Fort Scott *	4	–	3	4	–	4
Championship: Butler (KS) 40, Hutchinson 21
$ – Conference champion; † – Conference playoff participant; y – Championship game participant; * – Fort Scott was on NJCAA probation

2012 Kansas Jayhawk Community College Conference football standings
	Conf.			Overall
Team	W		L	W		L
Butler (KS) †y$	7	–	0	11	–	1
Hutchinson †y	6	–	1	9	–	3
Coffeyville †	5	–	2	6	–	4
Garden City †	4	–	3	7	–	4
Fort Scott	3	–	4	4	–	5
Independence	2	–	5	4	–	5
Highland (KS)	1	–	6	2	–	7
Dodge City	0	–	7	0	–	9
Championship: Butler (KS) 26, Hutchinson 16
$ – Conference champion; † – Conference playoff participant; y – Championship game participant

2013 Kansas Jayhawk Community College Conference football standings
	Conf.			Overall
Team	W		L	W		L
Butler (KS) †y$	6	–	1	9	–	2
Hutchinson †y	5	–	2	8	–	4
Dodge City †	5	–	2	6	–	4
Highland (KS) †	5	–	2	6	–	4
Coffeyville	3	–	4	4	–	5
Garden City	2	–	5	2	–	8
Fort Scott	1	–	6	2	–	7
Independence	1	–	6	2	–	7
Championship: Butler (KS) 24, Hutchinson 21
$ – Conference champion; † – Conference playoff participant; y – Championship game participant

2014 Kansas Jayhawk Community College Conference football standings
	Conf.			Overall
Team	W		L	W		L
Hutchinson $	7	–	0	11	–	1
Coffeyville	6	–	1	9	–	3
Butler (KS)	4	–	3	8	–	3
Highland (KS)	3	–	4	6	–	5
Fort Scott	3	–	4	4	–	6
Garden City	2	–	4	3	–	8
Dodge City	1	–	4	3	–	8
Independence	0	–	7	0	–	10
$ – Conference champion

2015 Kansas Jayhawk Community College Conference football standings
	Conf.			Overall
Team	W		L	W		L
No. 5 Butler (KS) +	6	–	1	9	–	2
No. 11 Dodge City +	7	–	1	9	–	3
No. 14 Coffeyville	4	–	3	8	–	3
Highland (KS)	4	–	3	5	–	5
Hutchinson	3	–	4	5	–	6
Garden City	2	–	5	3	–	8
Independence	2	–	5	2	–	8
Fort Scott	1	–	6	2	–	8
+ – Conference co-champions

2016 Kansas Jayhawk Community College Conference football standings
	Conf.			Overall
Team	W		L	W		L
No. 1 Garden City $	7	–	0	11	–	0
No. 15 Dodge City	4	–	3	7	–	4
No. 16 Highland (KS)	4	–	3	7	–	4
No. 17 Butler (KS)	4	–	3	7	–	5
Independence	4	–	3	5	–	4
Coffeyville	2	–	5	6	–	5
Hutchinson	2	–	5	5	–	6
Fort Scott	1	–	6	4	–	7
$ – Conference champion; Rankings from NJCAA poll

2017 Kansas Jayhawk Community College Conference football standings
	Conf.			Overall
Team	W		L	W		L
No. 5 Independence $	6	–	1	9	–	2
No. 15 Butler (KS)	5	–	2	8	–	3
No. 13 Garden City	5	–	2	8	–	4
Hutchinson	4	–	3	7	–	5
Coffeyville	3	–	4	4	–	7
Fort Scott	2	–	5	4	–	6
Highland (KS)	2	–	5	4	–	6
Dodge City	1	–	6	4	–	7
$ – Conference champion; Rankings from NJCAA poll

2018 Kansas Jayhawk Community College Conference football standings
	Conf.			Overall
Team	W		L	W		L
No. 2 Garden City $^	7	–	0	10	–	1
No. 8 Hutchinson	6	–	1	9	–	3
No. 11 Butler (KS)	5	–	2	8	–	4
No. 17 Highland (KS)	4	–	3	6	–	4
Coffeyville	3	–	4	6	–	5
Fort Scott	1	–	6	2	–	8
Independence	1	–	6	2	–	8
Dodge City	1	–	6	2	–	9
$ – Conference champion; ^ – NJCAA National Championship participant; Rankings from NJCAA poll

2019 Kansas Jayhawk Community College Conference football standings
	Conf.			Overall
Team	W		L	W		L
No. 8 Independence $	6	–	1	8	–	2
No. 3 Hutchinson	5	–	2	10	–	2
No. 5 Butler (KS)	5	–	2	10	–	3
No. 9 Garden City	5	–	2	8	–	3
No. 20 Highland (KS)	4	–	3	6	–	4
Coffeyville	2	–	5	4	–	7
Fort Scott	1	–	6	2	–	8
Dodge City	0	–	7	0	–	10
$ – Conference champion; Rankings from NJCAA poll

2020–21 Kansas Jayhawk Community College Conference football standings
	Conf.			Overall
Team	W		L	W		L
No. 1 Hutchinson $^	6	–	0	8	–	0
No. 5 Garden City	6	–	1	7	–	1
No. 7 Independence	5	–	2	5	–	2
Coffeyville	3	–	3	3	–	3
Butler (KS)	2	–	4	2	–	4
Dodge City	1	–	5	2	–	5
Highland (KS)	1	–	6	1	–	6
Fort Scott	0	–	3	0	–	3
$ – Conference champion; ^ – NJCAA playoff participant; Rankings from NJCAA poll

2021 Kansas Jayhawk Community College Conference football standings
	Conf.			Overall
Team	W		L	W		L
No. 11 Independence +	6	–	1	8	–	2
No. 15 Coffeyville +	6	–	1	6	–	3
No. 3 Hutchinson	5	–	2	9	–	2
No. 9 Garden City	5	–	2	8	–	3
Dodge City	3	–	4	3	–	6
Highland (KS)	2	–	5	2	–	7
Fort Scott	1	–	6	2	–	7
Butler (KS)	0	–	7	1	–	9
+ – Conference co-champions; Rankings from NJCAA Division I poll

2022 Kansas Jayhawk Community College Conference football standings
	Conf.			Overall
Team	W		L	W		L
No. 2 Hutchinson $^	6	–	0	11	–	1
No. 5 Coffeyville	4	–	2	8	–	3
No. 9 Butler (KS)	4	–	2	8	–	4
Independence	3	–	3	4	–	5
Garden City	3	–	3	4	–	6
Dodge City	1	–	5	3	–	7
Highland (KS)	0	–	6	2	–	8
$ – Conference champion; ^ – NJCAA Division I playoff participant; Rankings from NJCAA Division I poll

2023 Kansas Jayhawk Community College Conference football standings
	Conf.			Overall
Team	W		L	W		L
No. 3 Hutchinson $^	6	–	0	10	–	1
No. 6 Dodge City	5	–	1	8	–	3
No. 15 Highland (KS)	3	–	3	6	–	5
Garden City	3	–	3	5	–	6
Butler (KS)	2	–	4	5	–	5
Coffeyville	1	–	5	3	–	7
Independence	1	–	5	2	–	8
$ – Conference champion; ^ – NJCAA Division I playoff participant; Rankings from NJCAA Division I poll

2024 Kansas Jayhawk Community College Conference football standings
	Conf.			Overall
Team	W		L	W		L
No. 1 Hutchinson +^	5	–	1	11	–	1
No. 8 Coffeyville +	5	–	1	9	–	3
No. 12 Butler (KS) +	5	–	1	7	–	4
No. 15 Dodge City	3	–	3	6	–	4
Highland (KS)	1	–	5	5	–	6
Independence	1	–	5	3	–	8
Garden City	1	–	5	1	–	10
+ – Conference co-champions; ^ – NJCAA Division I playoff participant; Rankings from NJCAA Division I poll

2025 Kansas Jayhawk Community College Conference football standings
	Conf.			Overall
Team	W		L	W		L
No. 2 Hutchinson $^	6	–	0	11	–	1
No. 7 Coffeyville	5	–	1	7	–	3
No. 10 Butler (KS)	4	–	2	7	–	3
No. 15 Garden City	3	–	3	6	–	5
Independence	2	–	4	4	–	7
Dodge City	1	–	5	1	–	9
Highland (KS)	0	–	6	0	–	11
$ – Conference champion; ^ – NJCAA Division I playoff participant; Rankings from NJCAA Division I poll

== See also ==
- List of college athletic programs in Kansas
