= Highland Scotties =

Sports teams of Highland Community College

- University: Highland Community College
- Nickname: Scotties
- Association: NJCAA
- Conference: Kansas Jayhawk Community College Conference
- Athletic director: Jerre Cole
- Location: Highland, Kansas
- Varsity teams: 12
- Football stadium: Porter Family Stadium
- Basketball arena: Ben Allen Fieldhouse
- Baseball stadium: Highland Community Ballpark
- Softball stadium: Scottie Field
- Colors: Navy and gold
- Website: scottieathletics.com

The Highland Community College Scotties are the sports teams of Highland Community College located in Highland, Kansas, United States. They participate in the National Junior College Athletic Association and in the Kansas Jayhawk Community College Conference.

== Sports ==
Men's sports

- Baseball
- Basketball
- Cross country
- Football
- Track & field

Women's sports

- Basketball
- Cross country
- Softball
- Spirit Squad
- Track & field
- Volleyball
- Soccer

Men's and Women's sports

- E-Sports

== Facilities ==
Highland Community College has four athletic facilities.

- Ben Allen Fieldhouse – home of the men's and women's basketball teams, and volleyball team
- Porter Family Stadium – home of the Scotties football team
- Highland Community Ballpark – home of the Scotties baseball team
- Scotties Field – home of the Scotties softball team
