= Dodge City Conquistadors =

Sports teams of Dodge City Community College

Dodge City Community College Conquistadors
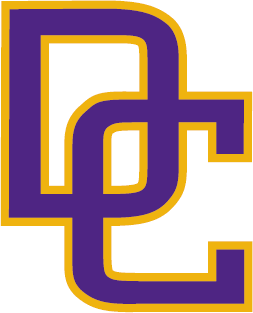
- University: Dodge City Community College
- Association: NJCAA
- Conference: Kansas Jayhawk Community College Conference
- Athletic director: Jacob Ripple
- Location: Dodge City, Kansas
- Varsity teams: 16
- Football stadium: Memorial Stadium
- Basketball arena: DCCC Student Activity Center
- Baseball stadium: Cavalier Field
- Softball stadium: Legends Field
- Soccer stadium: Memorial Stadium
- Nickname: Conqs
- Colors: Purple and gold
- Website: www.goconqs.com

The Dodge City Conquistadors are the sports teams of Dodge City Community College located in Dodge City, Kansas, United States. They participate in the National Junior College Athletic Association (NJCAA) and in the Kansas Jayhawk Community College Conference.

== Sports ==
Men's sports

- Baseball
- Basketball
- Cross country
- Football
- Golf
- Rodeo
- Soccer
- Track & field

Women's sports

- Basketball
- Cross country
- Golf
- Rodeo
- Soccer
- Softball
- Track & field
- Volleyball

== Facilities ==
Dodge City Community College has four athletics facilities.

- Cavalier Field – home of the Conqs baseball team
- Legends Field – home of the Lady Conqs softball team
- Memorial Stadium – home of the Conqs football and soccer teams
- DCCC Student Activity Center – home of the Conqs men's and women's basketball teams, and the volleyball team

== Notable alumni ==
- Larry Brown, NFL running back, winner of the 1972 NFL Most Valuable Player Award
- Edawn Coughman, football player
- Pete Emelianchik, tight end and special teams player for the Philadelphia Eagles
- Robelyn Garcia, All-time Dodge City Conquistador career scorer, former professional WBA 4X All-Star basketball player and WBA Championship MVP
- Gary Patterson, Texas Christian University head football coach
- Ron Prince, Kansas State University head football coach
- Darrin Simmons, Cincinnati Bengals special teams coordinator
- Steve Tasker, NFL special teams player, winner of the 1993 Pro Bowl Most Valuable Player Award, sports announcer for CBS

== Athletic Hall of Fame ==
The DCCC Athletic Hall of Fame has honored outstanding career contributors to Dodge City Community College Athletics.
