= Fort Scott Greyhounds =

- University: Fort Scott Community College
- Nickname: Greyhounds
- Association: NJCAA
- Conference: Kansas Jayhawk Community College Conference
- Athletic director: Tom Havron
- Location: Fort Scott, Kansas
- Varsity teams: 12
- Football stadium: Frary Field
- Basketball arena: Arnold Arena
- Baseball stadium: Lions Field
- Softball stadium: Betty Ruth Willard Complex
- Colors: Maroon and grey
- Website: www.fsgreyhounds.com

The Fort Scott Greyhounds are the sports teams of Fort Scott Community College located in Fort Scott, Kansas, United States. They participate in the National Junior College Athletic Association and in the Kansas Jayhawk Community College Conference. The Greyhounds football team won the 1970 NJCAA Football championship and finished as national runner up in 1971, 1972 and 2009.

== Sports ==
Men's sports

- Baseball
- Basketball
- Rodeo
- Track and field
- Cross country

Women's sports

- Basketball
- Rodeo
- Softball
- Volleyball
- Flag football
- Track and field
- Cross country

== Football ==
The Fort Scott football program began in 1923. The 1970 Fort Scott Greyhounds football team won the junior college national championship. Fort Scott terminated its football program after the 2021 season. The administration cited rules changes concerning out-of-state roster limits and scholarship funding that were enacted in 2016 among the reasons for cutting the program. The Greyhounds finished with an overall record of 448–428–23.

== Facilities ==
Fort Scott Community College has three athletics facilities.

- Arnold Arena – home of the men's and women's basketball teams, Rodeo teams, and Volleyball team
- Lions Field – home of the Greyhounds baseball team
- Ty Cullor Field – home of the Lady Greyhounds softball team
