= BJU Bruins men's soccer =

American college soccer team

Coordinates: 34.87189°N 82.36386°W

- Founded: 2012; 14 years ago
- University: Bob Jones University
- Athletic director: Dennis Scott
- Head coach: Greg Fulton (6th season)
- Conference: NCCAA DII (South)
- Location: Greenville, South Carolina, US
- Stadium: Alumni Stadium (capacity: 4,000)
- Nickname: Bruins
Home	Away

The BJU Bruins men's soccer is the team that represents Bob Jones University in the South Region of NCCAA Division II soccer. The team is coached by Chris Carmichael and has won the NCCAA DII National Championship in 2016, 2021, 2022, and 2024. The team plays its home games at Alumni Stadium on the university campus.

== History ==
The BJU Bruins men's soccer club was founded in 2012 under coach Jesse McCormick. In their first four seasons, they competed in NCCAA Division I before moving to NCCAA Division II in 2016. In 2019, Coach McCormick stepped down and was replaced by Matt Hotchkin. He coached for two years before resigning in 2021 and being replaced by Greg Fulton. The team has won four NCCAA DII national championships and four NCCAA DII South regional championships. They have produced 31 NCCAA DII All-Americans and three NCCAA DII National Players of the Year: Victor Oladipo (2020), Ian Arendse (2021), and Mario Figueroa (2024).

== Results by season ==
Season Results
Year	Coach	Overall Record	Conference Record	National Tournament Postseason
(NCCAA Division I South) (2012–2015)
2012	Jesse McCormick	10–5–1	–	Did not qualify
2013	Jesse McCormick	9–8–1	–	Did not qualify
2014	Jesse McCormick	5–13–0	0–7–0	Did not qualify
2015	Jesse McCormick	10–7–0	3–2–0	Did not qualify
(NCCAA Division II South) (2016–present)
2016	Jesse McCormick	9–10–1	2–0–0	NCCAA DII National Champions
2017	Jesse McCormick	5–12–2	1–1–1	NCCAA DII National Semifinals
2018	Jesse McCormick	5–14–1	2–1–0	NCCAA DII National Tournament Round 1
2019	Matt Hotchkin	6–12–0	3–1–0	Did not qualify
2020	Matt Hotchkin	9–3–1	5–0–0	NCCAA DII National Semifinals
2021	Greg Fulton	17–2–2	4–0–0	NCCAA DII National Champions
2022	Greg Fulton	15–4–1	3–0–0	NCCAA DII National Champions
2023	Greg Fulton	11–5–3	2–0–1	Did not qualify
2024	Greg Fulton	17–2–2	5–0–0	NCCAA DII National Champions
2025	Greg Fulton	6–8–3	0–0–0	Did not qualify
Totals 14 Years; 3 Coaches		134-105-18 (.556)	30-12-2 (.705)	7 Postseason Appearances

== Current roster ==
As of October 2026

Note: Flags indicate national team as defined under FIFA eligibility rules; some limited exceptions apply. Players may hold more than one non-FIFA nationality.

No.	Pos.	Nation	Player
00	GK	USA	Ryland Summers
0	GK	USA	Joel Pollock
1	GK	USA	Luke Provenzano
2	DF	USA	Justin Sealey
3	DF	USA	Rivers Hamilton
4	DF	TAN	David Issa
5	DF	USA	Samuel Gaddis
6	MF	USA	Bobby Gregory
7	MF	USA	Will Hotchkin
8	MF	USA	Noah Burkett
9	FW	USA	Dylan Poweska
10	MF	BDI	Fiston Issa
11	MF	MAW	Peter Chamdimba
13	DF	USA	Gerardo Gonzalez
14	MF	USA	Solomon Leaman

No.	Pos.	Nation	Player
15	MF	USA	Filipe Kiangala
16	FW	USA	Pedro Ribeiro
17	MF	USA	Bucky Provenzano
18	MF	USA	Matheus Ribeiro
19	MF	USA	Christian Gomez
21	DF	USA	Dylan Beirne
22	DF	COL	Emmanuel Cervantes
23	FW	GBR	Dayo Onajoko
24	MF	USA	Reid Burgin
25	DF	USA	Zachary Wilkinson
26	DF	USA	Renzo Fuentes
27	FW	USA	Jackson Reinhard
28	MF	USA	Carson Fisher
29	FW	USA	Abraham Swingle

== Individual Records ==
Career Goals
Player	Years	Goals
Mario Figueroa	2020–24	41
Victor Oladipo	2019–21	38
Matt Moore	2012–15	33
Jared Simmons	2014–17	28
Rylan Boldt	2021–24	26

Season Goals
Player	Years	Goals
Victor Oladipo	2021	23
Matt Moore	2013	15
Jared Simmons	2016	12
Mario Figueroa	2024	11
Victor Oladipo	2020	11

Career Assists
Player	Years	Assists
Ryan McCarty	2012–15	29
Mario Figueroa	2020–24	23
Matt Moore	2012–15	21
Jesse Rush	2016–19	16
Rylan Boldt	2021–24	14

Season Assists
Player	Year	Assists
Ryan McCarty	2015	14
Ian Arendse	2021	9
Mario Figueroa	2024	9
Anthony Ruiz	2024	8
Rylan Boldt	2024	7
Mario Figueroa	2020	7
Stephen Grider	2016	7
Stephen Lovelace	2013	7
Ryan McCarty	2013	7
Matt Moore	2015	7

Career Points
Player	Years	Points
Mario Figueroa	2020–24	105
Matt Moore	2012–15	87
Victor Oladipo	2019–21	83
Jared Simmons	2014–17	67
Rylan Boldt	2021–24	66

Season Points
Player	Year	Points
Victor Oladipo	2021	49
Matt Moore	2013	36
Mario Figueroa	2024	31
Mario Figueroa	2021	26
Jared Simmons	2016	26

Career Saves
Player	Years	Saves
Isaac Landry	2016–19	286
Andrew Kester	2014–17	208
Chris Monczewski	2018–22	162
Joseph Wooster	2013–15	160
Luke Provenzano	2023–26	135

Season Saves
Player	Year	Saves
Isaac Landry	2018	124
Andrew Kester	2016	110
Joseph Wooster	2014	91
Isaac Landry	2019	79
Luke Provenzano	2025	76
