= BJU Bruins women's basketball =

American college basketball team

- University: Bob Jones University
- First season: 2012–13; 14 years ago
- Athletic director: Dennis Scott
- Head coach: Mike LeViere; 15th season, 184–207 (.471)
- Location: Greenville, South Carolina
- Arena: Davis Field House (capacity: 3,000)
- Conference: NCCAA DII (South)
- Nickname: Bruins
- All-time record: 184–207 (.471)

Uniforms
Home	Away

The BJU Bruins women's basketball team represents Bob Jones University in South Region of NCCAA Division II basketball play. Established in 2012, the team has won 3 regional championships and competed in 5 NCCAA Women's Division II National Tournaments. The Bruins most recently appeared at the NCCAA DII tournament in 2022. BJU's basketball program has won 184 games in its 14-year history.

== History ==
The BJU Bruins women's basketball program began in 2012 under head coach Mike LeViere. The Bruins finished 10–16 in their inaugural season. LeViere has been head coach of the team each year since its inception. As of the end of the 2025–26 season, the Bruins have an overall record of 184–207. They have produced 31 NCCAA scholar-athletes, 31 NCCAA DII South All-Region athletes, 9 NCCAA DII All-American selections, and two NCCAA DII South Region Players of the Year, Sha'Ron Brunson (2018) and Sarah Thomsen (2019).

The Bruins have won the NCCAA DII South Region Championship three times (2016–17, 2019–20, and 2021–22).

== Coaches ==
Name	Career	Record	Pct.
Mike LeViere	2012–present	184–207	.471

== Season-by-season results ==
Season Results
Year	Coach	Overall Record	Conference Record	National Tournament Postseason
(NCCAA South) (2012–2016)
2012–13	Mike LeViere	10–16	0–0	Did not qualify
2013–14	Mike LeViere	19–11	2–2	Did not qualify
2014–15	Mike LeViere	18–14	3–3	Did not qualify
2015–16	Mike LeViere	19–12	2–4	Did not qualify
(NCCAA Division II South) (2016–present)
2016–17	Mike LeViere	16–19	7–2	NCCAA DII National Tournament Round 1
2017–18	Mike LeViere	14–20	6–2	NCCAA DII National Semifinals
2018–19	Mike LeViere	14–16	7–2	NCCAA DII National Tournament Round 1
2019–20	Mike LeViere	15–13	5–2	NCCAA DII National Tournament Round 1
2020–21	Mike LeViere	6–9	2–3	Did not qualify
2021–22	Mike LeViere	12–16	4–3	NCCAA DII National Tournament Round 1
2022–23	Mike LeViere	11–14	3–4	Did not qualify
2023–24	Mike LeViere	12–15	5–4	Did not qualify
2024–25	Mike LeViere	9–17	3–5	Did not qualify
2025–26	Mike LeViere	9–15	4–4	Did not qualify
Totals 14 Years; 1 Coach		184-207 (.471)	53-40 (.570)	5 Postseason Appearances

== Current roster ==
2026–27 BJU Bruins women's basketball team
Players
Coaches

Pos.	#	Name	Height	Year	Hometown
G	2	Imani Pouncey	5 ft 5 in (1.65 m)	Jr	Ludowici, Georgia
G	3	Peyton Teague	5 ft 5 in (1.65 m)	So	Siler City, North Carolina
G	5	Caitlyn Dickerson	5 ft 5 in (1.65 m)	Sr	Midland, Michigan
G	10	Larkin Wright	5 ft 8 in (1.73 m)	So	Charlottesville, Virginia
F	11	Keely Price	6 ft 0 in (1.83 m)	Jr	Boiling Springs, South Carolina
F	13	Jenna Brooks	5 ft 8 in (1.73 m)	Sr	Pittsboro, North Carolina
G	15	Faith Hayward	5 ft 5 in (1.65 m)	Jr	Greeley, Colorado
G	20	Sadie Day	—	Fr	Midland, Michigan
F	23	Diamynd Buckson	6 ft 1 in (1.85 m)	Jr	Cowpens, South Carolina
G	24	Kayley Trump	5 ft 7 in (1.7 m)	Jr	Princeton, West Virginia

Head coach

- Mike LeViere (Central Michigan)

Assistant coach(es)

- Sha'Ron Brunson (BJU)
- Gracen Ledford (BJU)

Legend

- (C) Team captain
- (S) Suspended
- (I) Ineligible
- (W) Walk-on
- Injured
- Current redshirt

Roster
Last update: November 17, 2026

== Individual honors ==
=== NCCAA DII South Region Players of the Year ===
- Sha'Ron Brunson (2018)
- Sarah Thomsen (2019)

=== NCCAA DII All-Americans ===
- Hannah Tompkins (2017)
- Sha'Ron Brunson (2018)
- Sarah Thomsen (2018–2019)
- Kylee Leffew (2019–2020)
- Madison Shupe (2020)
- Delaney Edwards (2021–2022)

== Individual records ==
- Points scored, single game: 33, Sha'Ron Brunson, January 6, 2017 vs. Florida College
- Points scored, season: 465, Delaney Edwards, 2021–22
- Points scored, career: 1,365, Kendra Jeffcott, 2012–16
- Field goals made, single game: 13, Keely Price, February 3, 2026 vs. Toccoa Falls
- Field goals made, season: 152, Delaney Edwards, 2021–22
- Field goals made, career: 477, Kendra Jeffcott, 2012–16
- Three-point field goals made, single game: 8, Sarah Thomsen, January 23, 2017, vs. Columbia International and February 3, 2018, vs. Trinity (FL); and Anna Layne Wylder, February 23, 2024, vs. Johnson (FL) and February 1, 2025, vs. Trinity Baptist
- Three-point field goals made, season: 86, Anna Layne Wylder, 2024–25
- Three-point field goals made, career: 269, Anna Layne Wylder, 2022–26
- Free throws made, single game: 13, Hannah Tompkins, February 3, 2015, vs. Columbia International
- Free throws made, season: 141, Delaney Edwards, 2021–22
- Free throws made, career: 312, Delaney Edwards, 2018–22
- Rebounds, single game: 25, Amanda Bates, February 9, 2017 vs. Trinity Baptist
- Rebounds, season: 284, Kendra Jeffcott, 2014–15
- Rebounds, career: 1,021, Kendra Jeffcott, 2012–16
- Assists, single game: 10, Annie Miller, February 1, 2024, vs. Trinity Baptist
- Assists, season: 106, Gracen Ledford, 2021–22
- Assists, career: 318, Gracen Ledford, 2017–22
- Steals, single game: 8, Kayley Trump, December 13, 2024, vs. Covenant
- Steals, season: 63, Delaney Edwards, 2021–22
- Steals, career: 192, Kendra Jeffcott, 2012–16
- Blocked shots, single game: 6, Shea Dickinson, November 28, 2022 vs. Warren Wilson
- Blocked shots, season: 31, Price, Keely, 2024–25
- Blocked shots, career: 95, Kendra Jeffcott, 2012–16
