= BJU Bruins women's soccer =

American college soccer team

Coordinates: 34.87189°N 82.36386°W

- Founded: 2012; 14 years ago
- University: Bob Jones University
- Athletic director: Dennis Scott
- Head coach: Chris Carmichael (15th season)
- Conference: NCCAA DII (South)
- Location: Greenville, South Carolina, US
- Stadium: Alumni Stadium (capacity: 4,000)
- Nickname: Bruins
Home	Away

The BJU Bruins women's soccer is the team that represents Bob Jones University in the South Region of NCCAA Division II soccer. The team is coached by Chris Carmichael and has won the NCCAA DII National Championship in 2013, 2015, 2016, 2017, 2019, 2023, 2024, 2025, and 2026. The team plays its home games at Alumni Stadium on the university campus.

== History ==
The BJU Bruins women's soccer club was founded in 2012 under coach Chris Carmichael. In their inaugural season they competed in NCCAA Division I before moving to NCCAA Division II the following season. Coach Carmichael cited the reason for this change as a need to give the program time to mature. The program returned to competing in Division I for three years from 2020 to 2022 before returning again to Division II in 2023 where it competes today. The team has won nine NCCAA DII national championships and nine NCCAA DII regional championships. They have produced 38 NCCAA DII All-Americans and three NCCAA DI All-Americans.

== Results by season ==
Season Results
Year	Coach	Overall Record	Conference Record	Postseason
(NCCAA Division I South) (2012–2012)
2012	Chris Carmichael	7–10–0	–	–
(NCCAA Division II South) (2013–2019)
2013	Chris Carmichael	15–5–2	–	NCCAA DII National Champions
2014	Chris Carmichael	12–5–2	3–1–1	–
2015	Chris Carmichael	14–9–0	5–1–0	NCCAA DII National Champions
2016	Chris Carmichael	15–6–0	5–0–0	NCCAA DII National Champions
2017	Chris Carmichael	11–9–1	3–1–0	NCCAA DII National Champions
2018	Chris Carmichael	11–7–2	2–0–0	NCCAA DII National Semifinals
2019	Chris Carmichael	13–8–0	1–0–0	NCCAA DII National Champions
(NCCAA Division I South) (2020–2022)
2020	Chris Carmichael	6–8–0	0–0–0	NCCAA DI National Quarterfinals
2021	Chris Carmichael	18–4–1	4–0–1	NCCAA DI National Tournament Round 1
2022	Chris Carmichael	14–7–1	1–0–0	NCCAA DI National Tournament Round 1
(NCCAA Division II South) (2023–present)
2023	Chris Carmichael	14–1–6	6–0–0	NCCAA DII National Champions
2024	Chris Carmichael	17–4–1	4–0–0	NCCAA DII National Champions
2025	Chris Carmichael	9–7–5	0–0–0	NCCAA DII National Champions
2026	Chris Carmichael	9–6–4	2–1–0	NCCAA DII National Champions
Totals 15 Years; 1 Coach		185-96-25 (.645)	36-4-2 (.897)	13 Postseason Appearances

== Current roster ==
As of October 2026

Note: Flags indicate national team as defined under FIFA eligibility rules; some limited exceptions apply. Players may hold more than one non-FIFA nationality.

No.	Pos.	Nation	Player
00	GK	USA	Caroline Roland
1	GK	USA	Margaret Provenzano
2	GK	USA	Ryleigh Tootle
3	DF	USA	Ashley Frederick
4	FW	USA	Kate Myers
5	DF	USA	Jane Farr
6	DF	USA	Brooke Coursen
7	FW	USA	Lily Davis
9	DF	USA	Estrella Cruz
10	MF	USA	Annabelle Gaddis
11	FW	USA	Katelyn Saldivar
12	MF	USA	Macy Smith

No.	Pos.	Nation	Player
13	MF	USA	Hannah Sheppard
14	DF	USA	Julia Hartzler
15	MF	USA	Madison Avelino
16	FW	USA	Ila Tomko
18	FW	USA	Mady Pfaffenroth
20	MF	USA	Chloe Ludlum
21	FW	USA	Lydia Howell
22	MF	USA	Danielle Jordan
25	MF	USA	Lauren Green
28	MF	USA	Shannon Miller
32	MF	USA	Amelia Peters

== Individual Records ==
Career Goals
Player	Years	Goals
Abby Davis	2015–18	72
Mia Marks	2020–24	59
Gabriela Gonzalez	2020–23	39
Francesca Aurednik	2022–25	33
Kayle Stevenson	2019–22	27

Season Goals
Player	Years	Goals
Abby Davis	2018	24
Mia Marks	2021	20
Abby Davis	2016	18
Miriam Lozano	2015	18
Abby Davis	2015	17
Gabriela Gonzalez	2023	17

Career Assists
Player	Years	Assists
Mia Marks	2020–24	30
Gabriela Gonzalez	2020–23	22
Spencer Martin	2012–15	21
Abby Davis	2015–18	20
Miriam Lozano	2015–16	12
Jenn Wise	2012–15	12

Season Assists
Player	Year	Assists
Mia Marks	2024	15
Anna Grace Abrams	2022	10
Abby Davis	2016	10
Anna Grace Abrams	2021	8
Gabriela Gonzalez	2021	8

Career Points
Player	Years	Points
Abby Davis	2015–18	164
Mia Marks	2020–24	148
Gabriela Gonzalez	2020–23	100
Miriam Lozano	2015–16	74
Francesca Aurednik	2022–25	74

Season Points
Player	Year	Points
Abby Davis	2018	50
Mia Marks	2024	47
Abby Davis	2016	46
Mia Marks	2021	46
Gabriela Gonzalez	2023	41
Miriam Lozano	2015	41

Career Saves
Player	Years	Saves
Margaret Provenzano	2023–26	279
Angelina Martin	2018–20	240
Tori Anderson	2012–14	195
Kristen Haertlein	2015–16	154
Jessica Baun	2015–17	99

Season Saves
Player	Year	Saves
Kristen Haertlein	2016	93
Angelina Martin	2019	91
Tori Anderson	2014	79
Margaret Provenzano	2023	79
Margaret Provenzano	2026	76

== Notable alumni ==
=== Professional players ===
- Anna Grace Abrams (2021–22) – Formerly with Greenville Liberty SC
- Gabriela Gonzalez (2020–23) – Formerly with Greenville Liberty SC
- Emily Walton (2022–23) – Formerly with Guam women's national football team
