= BJU Bruins men's basketball =

American college basketball team

- University: Bob Jones University
- First season: 2012–13; 14 years ago
- Athletic director: Dennis Scott
- Head coach: Tony Miller; 2nd season, 16–7 (.696)
- Location: Greenville, South Carolina
- Arena: Davis Field House (capacity: 3,000)
- Conference: NCCAA DII (South)
- Nickname: Bruins
- All-time record: 193–191 (.503)

Uniforms
Home	Away

The BJU Bruins men's basketball team represents Bob Jones University in South Region of NCCAA Division II basketball play. Established in 2012, the team has won 6 regional championships and competed in 7 NCCAA Men's Division II National Tournaments. The Bruins most recently appeared at the NCCAA DII tournament in 2026. BJU's basketball program has won 193 games in its 14-year history.

== History ==
The Bob Jones Bruins men's basketball program began in 2012 under head coach Neal Ring. The Bruins finished 6–24 in their inaugural season. As of the 2025–26 season, the Bruins have had 3 different head coaches of their men's team: Neal Ring (2012–17), Burton Uwarow (2017–25), and Tony Miller (2025–present). As of the end of the 2025–26 season, the Bruins have an overall record of 193–191.

The Bruins have won the NCCAA DII South Region Championship six times (2016–17, 2017–18, 2021–22, 2023–24, 2024–25, and 2025–26). In the 2017–18 season, the Bruins reached the National Championship game where they lost to defending champions, Randall College from Oklahoma. They entered the tournament as the #7 seed, and they claimed an upset victory over #2 seed Great Lakes Christian College 86–81 in the quarterfinals. They would go on to lose to the eventual tournament runner-up Crown College 72–84.

== Coaches ==
Name	Career	Record	Pct.
Neal Ring	2012–2017	63–94	.401
Burton Uwarow	2017–2025	114–90	.559
Tony Miller	2025–present	16–7	.696

== Season-by-season results ==
Season Results
Year	Coach	Overall Record	Conference Record	National Tournament Postseason
(NCCAA South) (2012–2015)
2012–13	Neal Ring	6–24	0–0	Did not qualify
2013–14	Neal Ring	16–15	3–3	Did not qualify
2014–15	Neal Ring	10–20	2–5	Did not qualify
(NCCAA Division II South) (2015–present)
2015–16	Neal Ring	15–16	1–4	Did not qualify
2016–17	Neal Ring	16–19	4–3	NCCAA DII National Tournament Round 1
2017–18	Burton Uwarow	22–11	7–0	NCCAA DII National Finals
2018–19	Burton Uwarow	10–19	7–1	NCCAA DII National Tournament Round 1
2019–20	Burton Uwarow	14–13	7–0	Did not qualify
2020–21	Burton Uwarow	4–9	3–0	Did not qualify
2021–22	Burton Uwarow	16–12	7–2	NCCAA DII National Tournament Round 1
2022–23	Burton Uwarow	12–13	4–6	Did not qualify
2023–24	Burton Uwarow	21–5	10–1	NCCAA DII National Tournament Round 1
2024–25	Burton Uwarow	15–8	7–2	NCCAA DII National Tournament Round 1
2025–26	Tony Miller	16–7	8–2	NCCAA DII National Finals
Totals 14 Years; 3 Coaches		193-191 (.503)	70-29 (.707)	7 Postseason Appearances

== Current roster ==
2026–27 BJU Bruins men's basketball team
Players
Coaches

Pos.	#	Name	Height	Weight	Year	Hometown
G	1	Coltenn Wagner	6 ft 2 in (1.88 m)	—	Fr	Avon, Iowa
G	2	Brandon Wilkins	6 ft 0 in (1.83 m)	—	Sr	Greenville, South Carolina
G	3	Trevor Pittman	6 ft 1 in (1.85 m)	—	Sr	Fort Myers, Florida
G	4	Drew Cannon	6 ft 3 in (1.91 m)	—	Jr	Greenville, South Carolina
F	10	Carter McCarn	6 ft 7 in (2.01 m)	—	Jr	Norcross, Georgia
G	11	Landen Sullivan	6 ft 2 in (1.88 m)	—	Fr	Easley, South Carolina
G	15	Lewis Robertson	6 ft 2 in (1.88 m)	—	Sr	Tokyo, Japan
G	21	Nick Cooreman	6 ft 2 in (1.88 m)	—	Fr	Stedman, North Carolina
G	22	Zachary Ladner	6 ft 0 in (1.83 m)	—	Fr	Pascagoula, Mississippi
F	23	MJ Littlejohn	6 ft 5 in (1.96 m)	—	Fr	Fort Mill, South Carolina
F	24	Maddox Memmen	6 ft 6 in (1.98 m)	—	Fr	Panama City, Florida
C	25	Trevor Gearhart	6 ft 8 in (2.03 m)	—	So	Greenville, South Carolina
G	31	Amari McCalope	6 ft 1 in (1.85 m)	—	So	Seneca, South Carolina
C	33	Braxton Murray	6 ft 5 in (1.96 m)	—	Jr	Columbia, South Carolina
C	44	Ryan Stevens	6 ft 10 in (2.08 m)	—	Fr	Macon, Georgia

Head coach

- Tony Miller (BJU)

Assistant coach(es)

- Kenney Garrick Jr. (BJU)

Legend

- (C) Team captain
- (S) Suspended
- (I) Ineligible
- (W) Walk-on
- Injured
- Current redshirt

Roster
Last update: November 9, 2026

== Individual honors ==
=== NCCAA DII South Region Players of the Year ===
- Nate Ellenwood (2018, 2020)
- Jayson Barnhart (2019)
- Henry Blair (2022)
- Devin Pope (2025)
- Shad Vander Hart (2026)

=== NCCAA DII All-Americans ===
- Marshall Riddle (2017)
- Nate Ellenwood (2018, 2020)
- Dustin Killough (2018)
- Jayson Barnhart (2019–2020)
- Devin Dean (2021)
- Henry Blair (2022–2023)
- Devin Pope (2025)
- Shad Vander Hart (2026)

== Individual records ==
- Points scored, single game: 40, Jayson Barnhart, February 5, 2019 vs. Carolina Christian
- Points scored, season: 655, Marshall Riddle, 2016–17
- Points scored, career: 1,679, Jayson Barnhart, 2016–20
- Field goals made, single game: 17, Jayson Barnhart, February 5, 2019 vs. Carolina Christian
- Field goals made, season: 237, Jayson Barnhart, 2018–19
- Field goals made, career: 663, Jayson Barnhart, 2016–20
- Three-point field goals made, single game: 9, Marshall Riddle, January 20, 2017, vs. Pensacola Christian
- Three-point field goals made, season: 154, Marshall Riddle, 2016–17
- Three-point field goals made, career: 273, Marshall Riddle, 2014–17
- Free throws made, single game: 18, Shad Vander Hart, October 23, 2025, vs. Montreat (NC)
- Free throws made, season: 199, Larry Taylor, 2013–14
- Free throws made, career: 352, Dustin Killough, 2014–18
- Rebounds, single game: 19, Kyle Turner, November 1, 2014 vs. Crown (TN)
- Rebounds, season: 315, Quez Fisher, 2016–17
- Rebounds, career: 871, Kyle Turner, 2012–16
- Assists, single game: 14, Shawn Lipscomb, January 15, 2016, vs. Pensacola Christian
- Assists, season: 185, Larry Taylor, 2013–14
- Assists, career: 416, Nate Ellenwood, 2016–20
- Steals, single game: 7, Trevor Brunson, January 29, 2024, vs. Warren Wilson
- Steals, season: 69, Larry Taylor, 2013–14
- Steals, career: 157, Shad Vander Hart, 2023–26
- Blocked shots, single game: 6, Tre Tipton, December 8, 2015 vs. Johnson & Wales (NC)
- Blocked shots, season: 52, Quez Fisher, 2016–17
- Blocked shots, career: 72, Quez Fisher, 2016–18
