= List of NCCAA institutions =

This is a list of institutions that compete in the National Christian College Athletic Association (NCCAA). There are currently 91 programs in the organization as of 2026–27.

== Central Region ==
=== Division I ===
School	City	State	Other affiliations
Central Christian College of Kansas	McPherson	Kansas	Sooner Athletic Conference (NAIA)
Champion Christian College	Hot Springs	Arkansas	Continental Athletic Conference (NAIA)
College of the Ozarks	Point Lookout	Missouri	Sooner Athletic Conference (NAIA)
Dallas Baptist University	Dallas	Texas	Lone Star (NCAA Division II)
Ecclesia College	Springdale	Arkansas	
Kansas Christian College	Overland Park	Kansas	
Mid-America Christian University	Oklahoma City	Oklahoma	Sooner Athletic Conference (NAIA)
Mission University	Springfield	Missouri	American Midwest Conference (NAIA)
Nelson University	Waxahachie	Texas	Sooner Athletic Conference (NAIA)
Oklahoma Wesleyan University	Bartlesville	Oklahoma	Kansas Collegiate Athletic Conference (NAIA)
Southwestern Christian University	Bethany	Oklahoma	Sooner Athletic Conference (NAIA)
Sterling College	Sterling	Kansas	Kansas Collegiate Athletic Conference (NAIA)
Wayland Baptist University	Plainview	Texas	Sooner Athletic Conference (NAIA)
York University	York	Nebraska	Kansas Collegiate Athletic Conference (NAIA)

=== Division II ===
School	City	State	Other affiliations
Barclay College	Haviland	Kansas	Midwest Christian College Conference
Calvary University	Kansas City	Missouri	Midwest Christian College Conference (ACCA)
Central Bible University	Moberly	Missouri	
Manhattan Christian College	Manhattan	Kansas	Midwest Christian College Conference (ACCA)
Spurgeon College	Kansas City	Missouri	
Ozark Christian College	Joplin	Missouri	Midwest Christian College Conference
Union Adventist University	Lincoln	Nebraska	

== Middle East Region ==
=== Division I ===
School	City	State	Other affiliations
Alice Lloyd College	Pippa Passes	Kentucky	USCAA
Asbury University	Wilmore	Kentucky	Collegiate Conference of the South (NCAA Division III)
Campbellsville University	Campbellsville	Kentucky	Mid-South Conference (NAIA)
Kentucky Christian University	Grayson	Kentucky	River States Conference (NAIA)
Lancaster Bible College	Lancaster	Pennsylvania	United East Conference (NCAA Division III)
Ohio Christian University	Circleville	Ohio	
Redeemer University	Ancaster	Ontario	Ontario Colleges Athletic Association (CCAA)

=== Division II ===
School	City	State	Other affiliations
Appalachian Bible College	Beckley	West Virginia	
Boyce College	Louisville	Kentucky	
Institute for God	Nashville	Tennessee	
Simmons College of Kentucky	Louisville	Kentucky	
Welch College	Nashville	Tennessee	

== Midwest Region ==
=== Division I ===
School	City	State/Province	Other affiliations
Cedarville University	Cedarville	Ohio	Great Midwest Athletic Conference (NCAA Division II)
Geneva College	Beaver Falls	Pennsylvania	Presidents' Athletic Conference (NCAA Division III)
Grace College	Winona Lake	Indiana	Crossroads League (NAIA)
Houghton University	Houghton	New York	Empire 8 (NCAA Division III)
Huntington University	Huntington	Indiana	Crossroads League (NAIA)
Malone University	Canton	Ohio	Great Midwest Athletic Conference (NCAA Division II)
Roberts Wesleyan University	North Chili	New York	East Coast Conference (NCAA Division II)

=== Division II ===
School	City	State/Province	Other affiliations
Emmaus University	Dubuque	Iowa	Midwest Christian College Conference
Grace Christian University	Grand Rapids	Michigan	
Great Lakes Christian College	Delta Township	Michigan	
Kuyper College	Grand Rapids	Michigan	
Maranatha Baptist University	Watertown	Wisconsin	Independent (NCAA Division III)
Moody Bible Institute	Chicago	Illinois	

== North Region ==
=== Division II ===
School	City	State/Province	Other affiliations
Crown College	St. Bonifacius	Minnesota	Upper Midwest Athletic Conference (NCAA Division III)
Faith Baptist Bible College	Ankeny	Iowa	Midwest Christian College Conference
North Central University	Minneapolis	Minnesota	Upper Midwest Athletic Conference (NCAA Division III)
Oak Hills Christian College	Bemidji	Minnesota	Northern Intercollegiate Athletic Conference
Trinity Bible College	Ellendale	North Dakota	Northern Intercollegiate Athletic Conference

== North Central Region ==
=== Division I ===
School	City	State	Other affiliations
Bethel University	Mishawaka	Indiana	Crossroads League (NAIA)
Greenville University	Greenville	Illinois	St. Louis Intercollegiate Athletic Conference (NCAA Division III)
Hannibal–LaGrange University	Hannibal	Missouri	American Midwest Conference (NAIA)
Judson University	Elgin	Illinois	Chicagoland Collegiate Athletic Conference (NAIA)
University of Northwestern – St. Paul	Roseville	Minnesota	Upper Midwest Athletic Conference (NCAA Division III)

== South Region ==
=== Division I ===
School	City	State	Other affiliations
Carolina University	Winston-Salem	North Carolina	Continental Athletic Conference (NAIA)
Clinton College	Rock Hill	South Carolina	
Columbia International University	Columbia	South Carolina	Appalachian Athletic Conference (NAIA)
University of Fort Lauderdale	Fort Lauderdale	Florida	
North Greenville University	Tigerville	South Carolina	Conference Carolinas (NCAA Division II)
Paine College	Augusta	Georgia	
Regent University	Virginia Beach	Virginia	Coast to Coast Athletic Conference (NCAA Division III)
Southern Wesleyan University	Central	South Carolina	Conference Carolinas (NCAA Division II)
Virginia University of Lynchburg	Lynchburg	Virginia	
Warner University	Lake Wales	Florida	The Sun Conference (NAIA)

=== Division II ===
School	City	State	Other affiliations
Baptist University of Florida	Graceville	Florida	
Bob Jones University	Greenville	South Carolina	
Carolina Christian College	Winston-Salem	North Carolina	
Pensacola Christian College	Pensacola	Florida	
Selma University	Selma	Alabama	
Southeastern Baptist College	Laurel	Mississippi	
University of Toccoa Falls	Toccoa	Georgia	
Trinity College of Jacksonville	Jacksonville	Florida	

== Southwest Region ==
=== Division II ===
School	City	State	Other affiliations
Arlington Baptist University	Arlington	Texas	
College of Biblical Studies	Houston	Texas	
Dallas Christian College	Farmers Branch	Texas	
Randall University	Moore	Oklahoma	
Southwestern Adventist University	Keene	Texas	USCAA

== West Region ==
=== Division I ===
School	City	State/Province	Other affiliations
Azusa Pacific University	Azusa	California	Southern California Intercollegiate Athletic Conference (NCAA Division III)
Bethesda University	Anaheim	California	
Justice University	Chandler	Arizona	
Nelson American Indian College	Phoenix	Arizona	
Nobel University	Buena Park	California	
Ottawa University – Arizona (OUAZ)	Surprise	Arizona	Great Southwest Athletic Conference (NAIA)
West Coast Baptist College	Lancaster	California	

== See also ==
- List of NCAA Division I institutions
- List of NCAA Division II institutions
- List of NCAA Division III institutions
- List of NAIA institutions
- List of USCAA institutions
- List of NJCAA Division I schools
- List of NJCAA Division II schools
- List of NJCAA Division III schools
