= Bob Jones Bruins =

Athletics teams of Bob Jones University, in Greenville, South Carolina, United States

Coordinates: 34.87189°N 82.36386°W

- University: Bob Jones University
- Nickname: Bruins
- NCCAA: Division II – South
- Conference: Independent
- President: Bruce McAllister
- Athletic director: Dennis Scott
- Location: Greenville, South Carolina
- Varsity teams: 11 (6 men's, 5 women's)
- Basketball arena: Davis Field House
- Baseball stadium: Conestee Park
- Soccer stadium: Alumni Stadium
- Colors: Navy and Columbia Blue
- Mascot: Brody the Bruin
- Website: www.bjubruins.com

The Bob Jones Bruins are the athletics teams of Bob Jones University, in Greenville, South Carolina, United States. They are a member of the National Christian College Athletic Association (NCCAA), competing in the South Region of the Division II level in 11 sports.

In 2012, the university inaugurated intercollegiate athletics with four teams: men's soccer, men's basketball, women's soccer, and women's basketball. The university added intercollegiate golf and cross-country teams during the 2013–2014 school year. Men's and women's shooting sports were added in 2016. Men's baseball began in the spring of 2021. Director of athletics Neal Ring resigned in 2023; he had overseen Bruins Athletics since inception.

Through its first 13 seasons, the athletic department amassed 32 NCCAA National Championships, over 150 All-Americans, and nearly 300 Scholar-Athletes. Bruins Athletics also received nine straight Presidential Awards for Excellence, honoring the most successful NCCAA DII athletics program.

In 2018, BJU explored National Collegiate Athletic Association (NCAA) membership and applied for it in January 2020. The Bruins were accepted as Division III provisional members in June for three years, making it the only Division III school in the state. The school has been searching for a conference.

== Athletics ==
Men's sports	Division	Women's sports	Division
Baseball	NCCAA DII (South)	Volleyball	NCCAA DII (South)
Basketball	NCCAA DII (South)	Basketball	NCCAA DII (South)
Cross country	NCCAA DII (South)	Cross country	NCCAA DII (South)
Soccer	NCCAA DII (South)	Soccer	NCCAA DII (South)
Track and field	NCCAA DII (South)	Track and field	NCCAA DII (South)
Golf	NCCAA DII (South)		

=== Baseball ===
Bob Jones Bruins baseball began in the spring of 2021. The team participates in the NCCAA South Regional Tournament each postseason with winners advancing to the NCCAA Baseball World Series. The Bruins baseball program has yet to claim any championships in their division. As of the end of the 2026 season, the Bruins have an overall record of 60–166.

=== Basketball ===
==== Men's basketball ====
The Bob Jones Bruins men's basketball program began in 2012 under head coach Neal Ring. The Bruins finished 6–24 in their inaugural season. As of the 2025–26 season, the Bruins have had 3 different head coaches of their men's team: Neal Ring (2012–17), Burton Uwarow (2017–25), and Tony Miller (2025–present). As of the end of the 2025–26 season, the Bruins have an overall record of 193–191.

The Bruins have won the NCCAA DII South Region Championship six times (2016–17, 2017–18, 2021–22, 2023–24, 2024–25, and 2025–26). In the 2017-2018 season, the Bruins reached the National Championship game where they lost to defending champions, Randall College from Oklahoma. They entered the tournament as the #7 seed, and they claimed an upset victory over #2 seed Great Lakes Christian College 86–81 in the quarterfinals. They would go on to lose to the eventual tournament runner-up Crown College 72–84.

==== Women's basketball ====
The Bob Jones Bruins women's basketball program began in 2012 under head coach Mike LeViere. The Bruins finished 10–16 in their inaugural season. LeViere has been head coach of the team each year since its inception. As of the end of the 2025–26 season, the Bruins have an overall record of 184–207.

The Bruins have won the NCCAA DII South Region Championship three times (2016–17, 2019–20, and 2021–22).

=== Cross country ===
==== Men's cross country ====
The Bob Jones Bruins men's cross country team was founded in 2013 under head coach Landon Bright, nephew of three-time American Olympian Tim Bright. Bright won five consecutive NCCAA DII National Coach of the Year Awards and NCCAA DII National Championships from 2016–2020 as the men's head coach before joining the cross country coaching staff of his alma mater, Point Loma Nazarene University. He was succeeded by Ken Roach, who has both continued and matched Bright's streaks, accumulating five consecutive NCCAA DII National Coach of the Year Awards and NCCAA DII National Championships from 2021–2025 himself.

The Bruins men's cross country team boasts an ongoing streak of ten consecutive NCCAA DII National Championships from 2016 to 2026.

==== Women's cross country ====
The Bob Jones Bruins women's cross country team was also founded in 2013 under head coach Landon Bright. He won the 2020 NCCAA DII National Coach of the Year Award and NCCAA DII National Championship with the team. Bright was succeeded by Ken Roach in 2021, who won three NCCAA DII National Coach of the Year Awards and NCCAA DII National Championships in 2021–2023.

The Bruins women's cross country team has won four NCCAA DII National Championships, all consecutively from 2020–2023.

== Facilities ==
=== Davis Field House ===
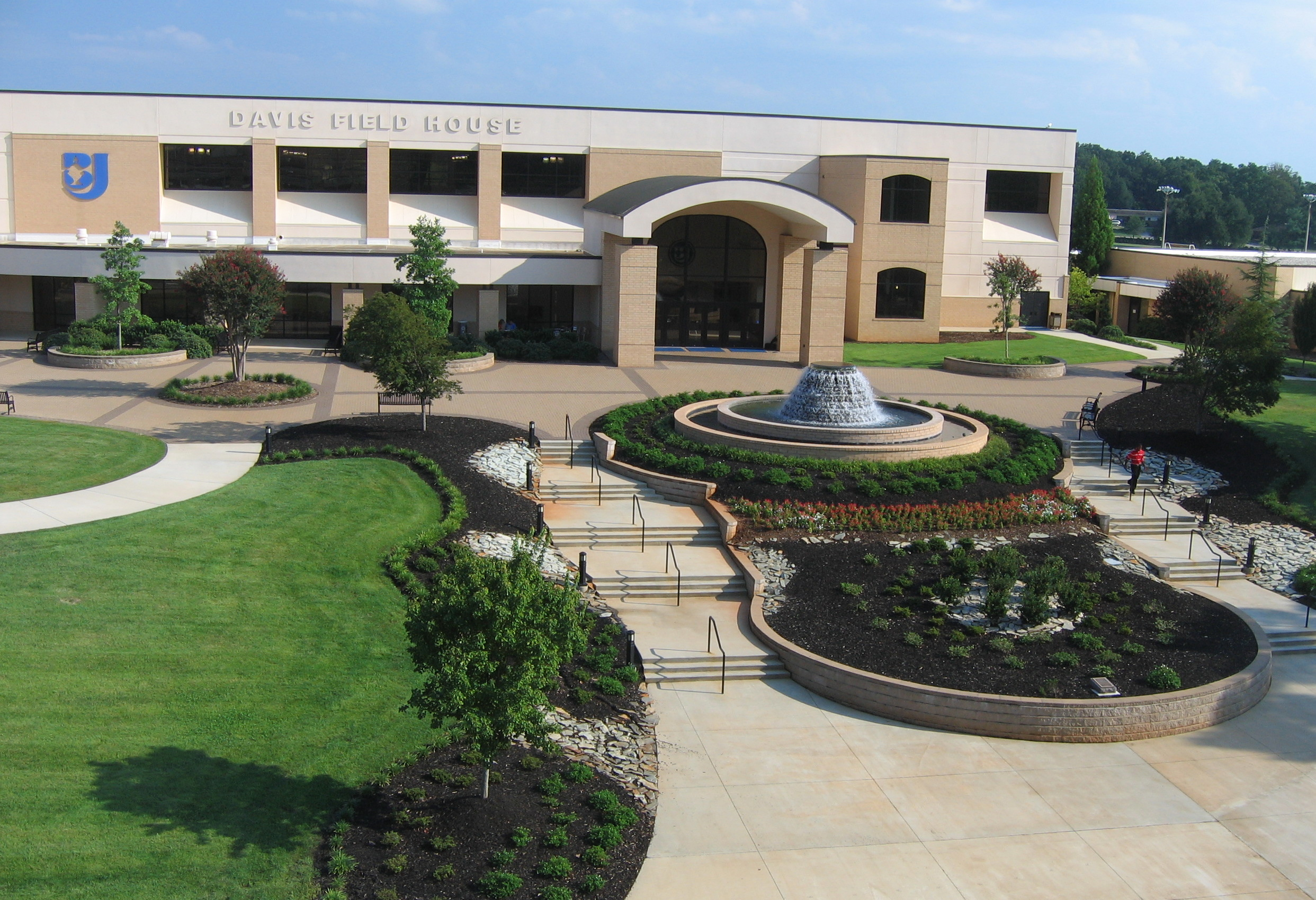
Davis Field House

Davis Field House is a 90,000 square-foot indoor sports facility built in 2004 and is the home of the Bruins basketball teams and volleyball team. It houses three college-sized basketball courts/four volleyball courts, an indoor running track (1/7 of a mile), and a ladies fitness center.

=== Alumni Stadium ===
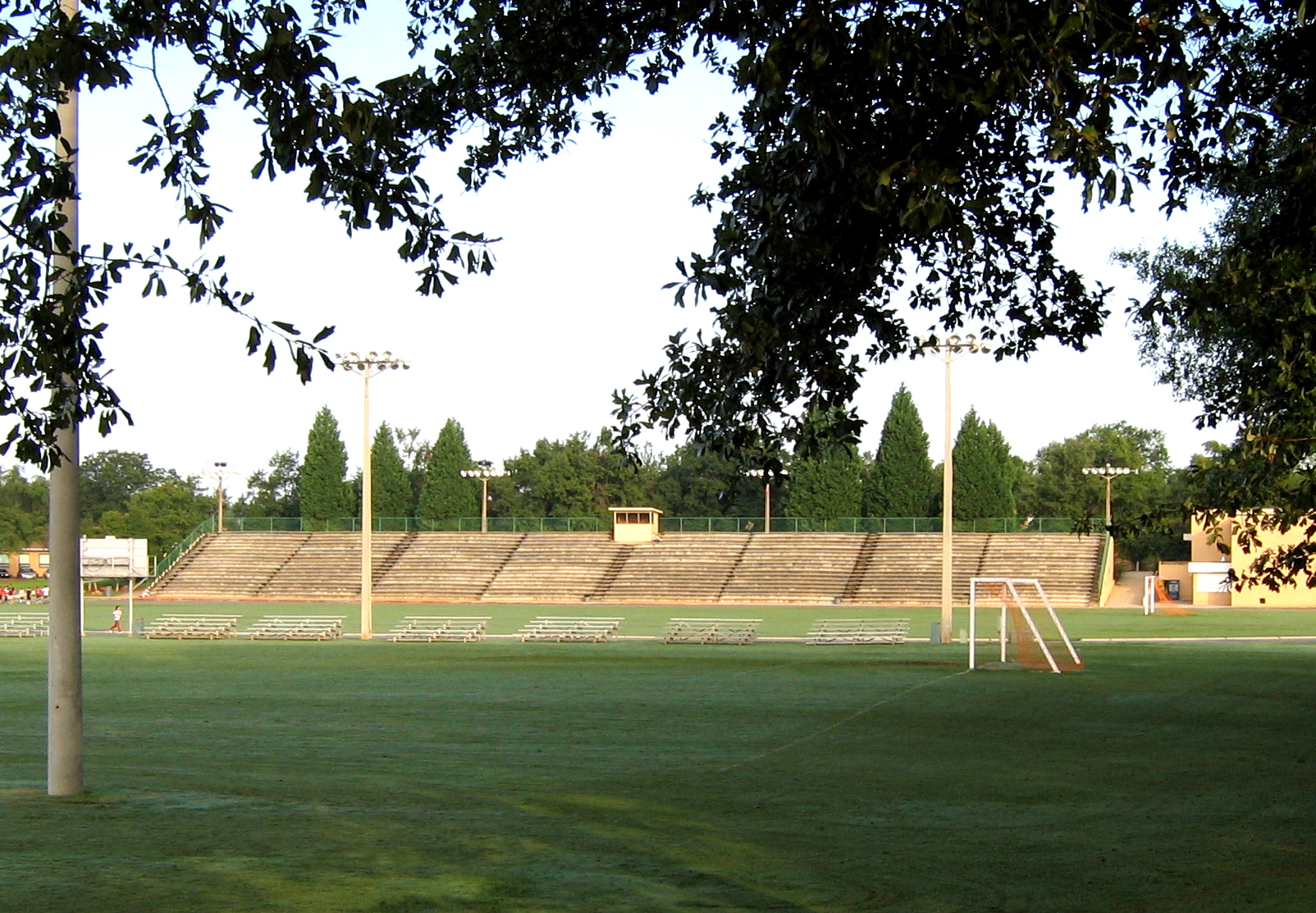
Alumni Stadium

Alumni Stadium is an outdoor stadium with a 4,500-seat capacity completed in 1968 that is the home of the Bruins soccer teams and track & field teams. The stadium houses four soccer fields, a 1/4 mile track for competitive and recreational running, two sand outdoor volleyball courts, and an activity pavilion with two outdoor basketball courts.

=== Conestee Park ===
Conestee Park is a community recreational and sports facility in Greenville, South Carolina used as the home field of the Bob Jones Bruins baseball team. The park contains five baseball fields, including one 7,000-seat stadium. The stadium formerly served as the home field for the Greenville Braves (AA affiliate of the Atlanta Braves) from 1984–2004.

== Mascot ==
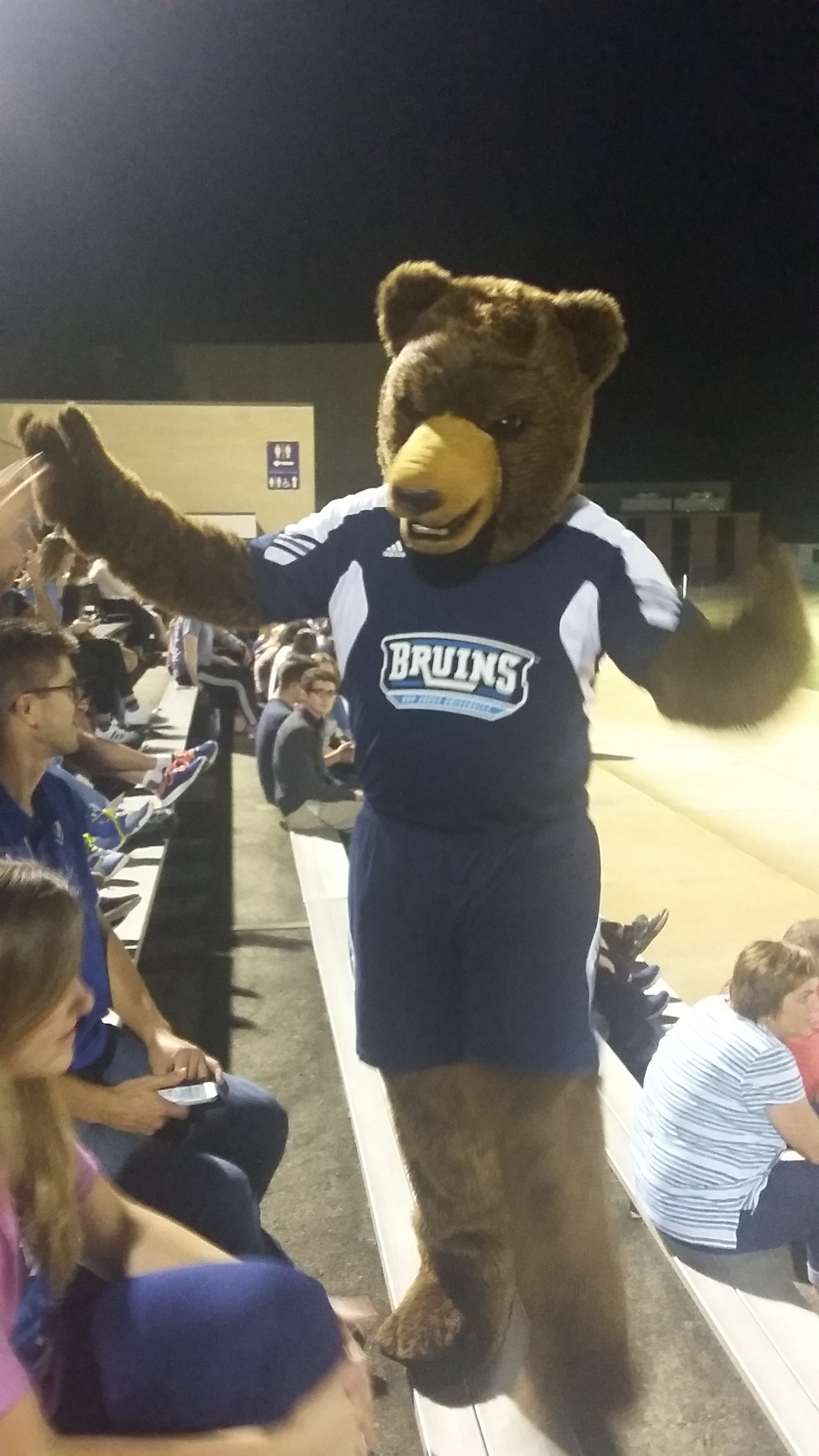
Brody the Bruin at a soccer game

The official mascot of Bob Jones University is Brody the Bruin. He appears often at sporting events and pep rallies while also frequently being featured in promotional campaigns for the university and in social media.

Bob Jones University has had Brody as the mascot for the Bruins since the inception of its intercollegiate athletics program in 2012.
