= Emily Walton =

Guamanian footballer (born 2002)

Personal information
- Date of birth: January 11, 2002 (age 24)
- Place of birth: Cochranville, Pennsylvania, U.S.
- Height: 5 ft 8 in (1.73 m)
- Position: Midfielder

College career
Years	Team	Apps	(Gls)
2022–2026	Bob Jones University	25	(0)

International career
2022–	Guam		

Emily Brooke Walton is an American–Guamanian professional footballer who plays as a midfielder for Guam national team. She played collegiate football for the Bob Jones Bruins women's team.

== Early life ==
From Barrigada, Guam, Walton is the daughter of Gary and Faith Walton and the oldest of four siblings. She graduated high school from Harvest Christian Academy in 2022. She attended Bob Jones University for four years.

== International career ==
Walton represented Guam internationally at the 2024 WAFF Women's Championship.

== Style of play ==
Walton mainly operates as an attacking midfielder and a forward.

== See also ==
- 2024 WAFF Women's Championship squads
