= Ernest Tatham =

(Charles Ernest) C. E. Tatham (13 February 1905 – 14 September 1997) was a Canadian theologian, missionary, and author of books.

== Early life ==
Tatham was born in Wellington, Ontario, in 1905. He was the son of Charles Goodeve Tatham (1854–1918). He earned a B.A. degree in Theology from Toronto Bible College.

== Career ==
Tatham is best remembered as a co-founder of Emmaus Bible College in Dubuque, Iowa, in 1941, along with R.E. Harlow and John Smart. Some of the correspondence courses he wrote remain part of the curriculum to this very day.

In 1959, Tatham also founded Kingsway Academy, a Christian school in Nassau, Bahamas. In 1970, he was a founding board member of another Christian school; The King's Academy in West Palm Beach, Florida.

He planted nine Open Brethren churches throughout Canada and the United States.

== Literary career ==
Tatham was a prolific author over a period spanning nearly sixty years. In addition to course materials for Emmaus Bible College, he wrote a number of books for the wider public. Among these were Daniel Speaks Today, Forever Secure: Now and Hereafter, Waiting for the Sunrise, Food for New Believers, and Let the Tide Come In!

== The Charismatic Movement ==
For most of his life, Tatham was a strict cessationist. Like most of his fellow-Brethren, he believed that the so-called sign gifts (miracles, divine healing, and speaking in tongues) were given only to the early church, for the purpose of authenticating the apostles, and "ceased" with the apostles' deaths. He argued for this view in the Emmaus course on the Holy Spirit, which he authored in 1942. He revised his views in the 1970s, however, and in his 1976 book Let the Tide Come In!, he embraced continualism (the view that all spiritual gifts are operating today) and said that his earlier support for cessationism had been mistaken. He never endorsed the organized Pentecostal and Charismatic movements, however. He continued to oppose the doctrine of subsequence; he came to believe in the validity of speaking in tongues, but never endorsed the Pentecostal doctrine that it marks a post-conversion Baptism in the Holy Spirit. Indeed, he addressed his book "to all who want God's gifts, but are unable to accept mainstream Charismatic theology." Although the Third Wave movement as such did not exist at the time, the views he expressed were later adopted by large sections of it.

== Personal life ==
Tatham’s first wife was Buelah Northey (with whom he had 5 children) until her death from cancer in her fifties. He married his second wife Louise Locke and remained married until her death in her nineties.

He was the father of Ruth (Tatham) Nottage, Lois (Tatham) Clark, Grace (Tatham) Kemp, Dave Tatham, and Paul Tatham, several of whom assisted in the running of Kingsway Academy in Nassau, Bahamas and The King's Academy in West Palm Beach, Florida.

Tatham enjoyed 3 grandchildren and 1 great grandchild from Ruth, 1 grandson from Lois, 4 grandchildren and 4 great grandchildren from Grace, and 3 grandchildren and 3 great grandchildren from Paul.

== Works ==
- Let the tide come in! (1976)
