= Kingsway Academy, Nassau =

School in the Bahamas

Coordinates: 25°03′12″N 77°18′34″W

Kingsway Academy or Kingsway Christian Academy, located in Nassau, Bahamas, is an interdenominational Christian primary and secondary school. Established in 1959, the school has grown from a modest beginning into one of the Bahamas's most respected education institutions.

== History ==
Kingsway Academy traces its origins to 1957 when Canadian missionary Ernest Tatham envisioned a Christian school in Nassau. His daughter, Ruth had established the Jack and Jill Nursery School on Dowdeswell Street and, in 1958, Tatham established a primary school behind the nursery school, which he called the Charles Tatham Memorial School, named after his father, Charles Goodeve Tatham. The school was initially managed by teacher, Shirley Redbath. Tatham's daughter, Grace, arrived in 1960 and ran the school for the next 14 years.

In 1961, the school was rebranded Kingsway Academy as "the children could neither remember nor pronounce" the original name. The school opened with seven students and its rapid growth eventually led to its relocation to a larger property on Bernard Road in 1968. The construction of an L-shaped elementary school at the Bernard Road property was spearheaded by Chic Anderson, a Christian building contractor, who worked tirelessly for 18 months to complete the project. The new building was ready, albeit initially without doors and furniture. The local churches lent tables and chairs to support the school in its early days.

The school continued to grow, adding new facilities and increasing enrollment. Carol Harrison became the principal in 1973, overseeing significant developments, including the annexation of additional land in 1999, which further cemented the school's status as a premier educational institution.

== Co-curricular activities ==
=== Music ===
The school choir toured the US in 2013, with the 50-member choir performing at the Alexander Memorial AME Church in Atlanta and Fisk University in Nashville.

=== Sports ===
The school's sports teams are known as the Saints.

In 2013, the school, No. 4 seeds, won the Bahamas Association of Independent Secondary Schools (BAISS) senior girls soccer champions.

The school's sports programs were interrupted in 2021 as a result of the pandemic. By 2023, the program had bounced back when the school lifted the over-14 title in the country’s first high school flag football tournament. A month later, the primary school won the Bahamas Scholastic Athletic Association (BSAA) track and field championships.

In 2024, the school's junior girls won the BAISS volleyball title after a perfect season. In 2025, the school won the BAISS senior girls basketball championship.

=== Honour Society ===
The school has a chapter of the Alpha Kappa Tau Honor Society. Members contribute to the community and serve as peer tutors at the school.

=== Other ===
In 2014, the school became the pilot school in the Bahamas for the US Embassy-sponsored Innovative Science “Where does the garbage go?” project.

== Principals ==
This is an incomplete list of principals of the school:

- Grace Tatham Kemp, 1960–1973
- Carol Harrison, 1973–?
- Mildred Turner, ?–2005

== Notable alumni ==
- Rick Fox, NBA basketball player
- Allyson Maynard, Member of Parliament and Cabinet Minister
- Branville McCartney, Member of Parliament and Cabinet Minister
- John Cox, artist
