= Midwest Christian College =

College in Oklahoma, United States

Coordinates: 35°32′21″N 97°29′31″W

- Type: Private
- Established: September 1946
- Location: Oklahoma City, Oklahoma, United States
- Affiliations: Part of Restoration Movement Christian Churches/Churches of Christ
- Website: occ.edu

Midwest Christian College was a private, Christian college established in 1946 in Oklahoma City, United States. During its first year, it enrolled thirty-three students. After peaking in the 1970s and 1980s, it experienced a period of declining enrollment and financial difficulty.

When it opened in 1946, it was based in two apartment buildings at NW 26 and McKinley. The college opened a new campus in northeast Oklahoma City (at NE 63 and Kelley) in 1955. The enrollment was 90 students in 1962.

It merged in 1985 with Ozark Bible College of Joplin, Missouri, to form Ozark Christian College.

At the time of closure, the school had 83 students on a 35 acre campus located at 3400 Thomas Road in Oklahoma City.
