= Joshua Crockett =

American Baptist pastor and former president of Bob Jones University

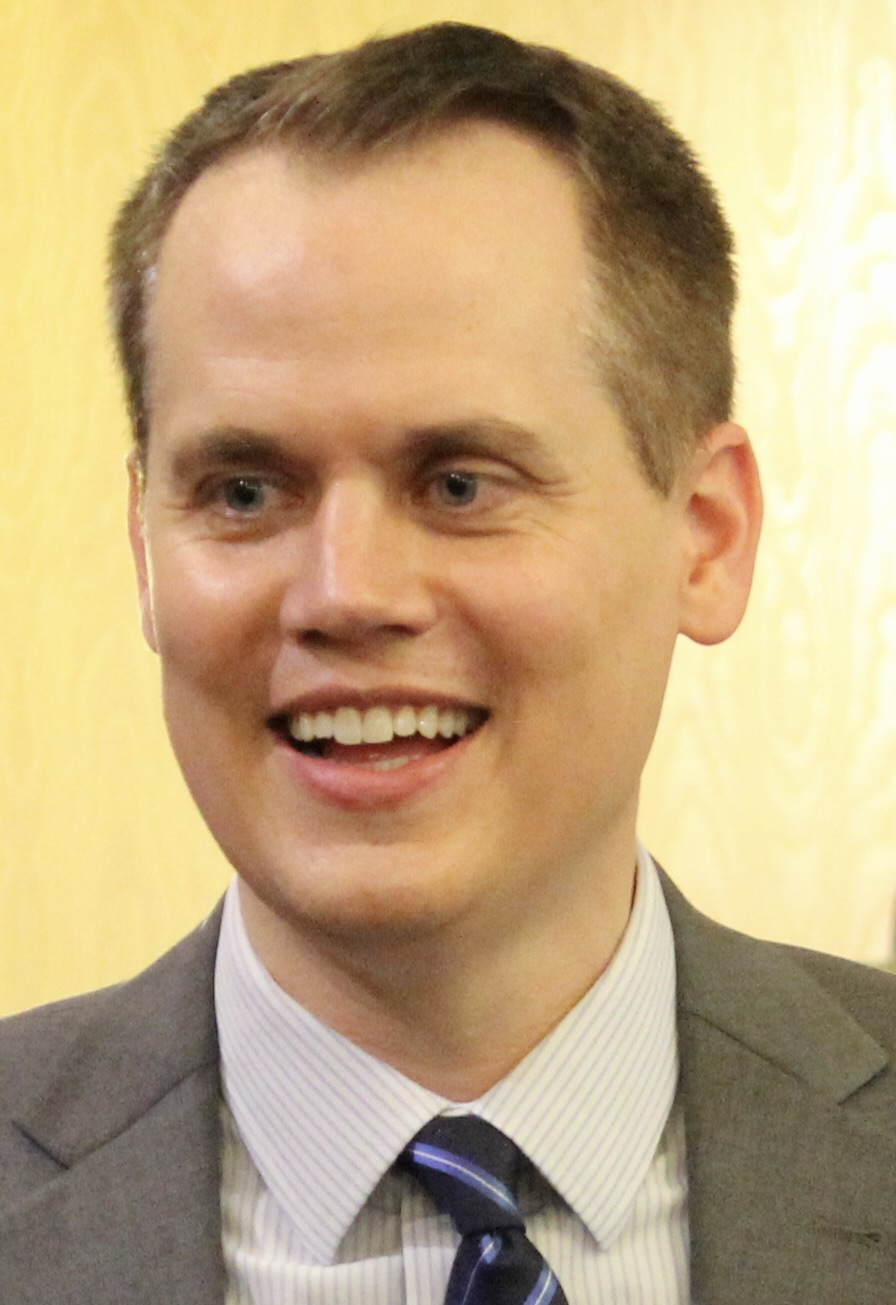
- Josh Crockett on May 7, 2024

6th President of Bob Jones University
- In office 2024–2025
- Preceded by: Steve Pettit
- Succeeded by: Bruce McAllister

Personal details
- Born: January 17, 1979 (age 47)
- Spouse: Karie Therit Crockett
- Children: 4
- Parents: Leigh Allison Crockett, Jr.; Elizabeth Buining Crockett
- Education: Bob Jones University (BA, MA, MDiv); Liberty University (DMin)

Joshua Leigh Crockett (born January 17, 1979) is an American Baptist pastor and was briefly the sixth president of Bob Jones University.

Crockett earned a Bachelor of Arts in rhetoric and public address, a master's degree in counseling, and a Master of Divinity from Bob Jones University. He earned a Doctor of Ministry with an emphasis on expository preaching from Liberty University in 2020.

In 2004, Crockett began ministering in his home church, Grace Baptist, Anderson, Indiana, and led Indiana Christian Academy. He also served as vice president of the Indiana Fundamental Baptist Fellowship and was member of the board of the Indiana Association of Christian Schools.

In 2015, Crockett became pastor of Morningside Baptist Church in Greenville, South Carolina. Crockett serves as chair of Open Door Baptist Missions and also serves on the board of Elijah's Harbor, a Christian retreat center.

On May 7, 2024, the Bob Jones University Board of Trustees named Crockett president after an extensive presidential search that followed the 2023 resignation of the fifth president, Steve Pettit.

In April 2025, Crockett announced plans for BJU to divide its presidency into two offices, a CEO and a campus pastor, of which he would serve in the latter role. Crockett told the student body that he had "not resigned." Nevertheless, in May 2025, the Board named Vice President for Ministry, Bruce McAllister, as the seventh president, and Morningside Baptist Church announced that Crockett would return as senior pastor effective July 1, 2025.

Academic offices
Preceded by Steve Pettit	President of Bob Jones University; 2024–2025	Succeeded by Bruce McAllister
