= Manhattan Christian College =

Private christian college in Manhattan

Coordinates: 39°11′08″N 96°34′44″W

- Established: 1927
- Affiliations: Private college
- Religious affiliation: Christian churches and churches of Christ
- President: Devin Wendt (Interim)
- Undergraduates: 160
- Postgraduates: 0
- Location: Manhattan, Kansas, United States
- Campus: Suburban
- Nickname: Thunder
- Sporting affiliations: NCCAA – Midwest Christian College Conference
- Website: www.mccks.edu

Manhattan Christian College (MCC) is a private Christian college in Manhattan, Kansas, United States. It was founded in 1927 as Christian Workers University. The institution's name was changed to Manhattan Bible College in 1930 and Manhattan Christian College in 1971.

MCC is historically affiliated with nondenominational, independent Christian churches and churches of Christ of the Restoration Movement. While many of the students and professors have a background in Christian Church/Churches of Christ congregations, students from other denominational backgrounds are encouraged to attend and are welcomed into the MCC family.

The college is accredited by the Higher Learning Commission and the Association for Biblical Higher Education.

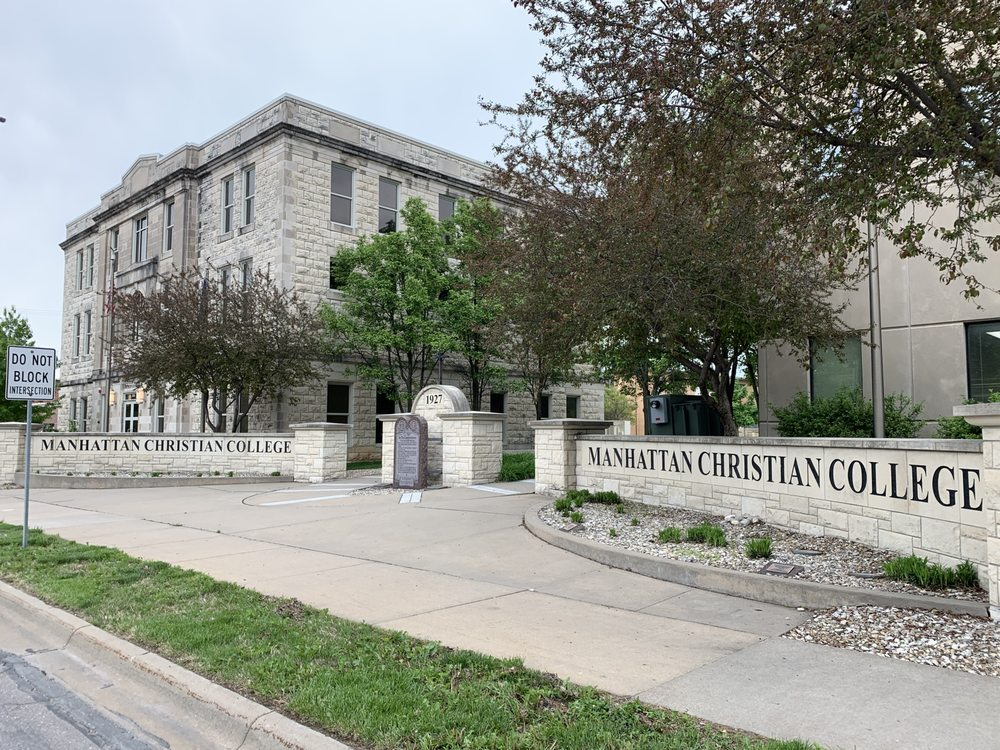

== Academics ==
Programs of study include both single and dual-degrees (in cooperation with Kansas State University, as well as an adult degree completion program both on campus and online.

The college offers bachelor of arts or science degrees in various ministerial fields. The Leadership Education for Adult Development (LEAD) degree completion program assists individuals interested in either Management & Ethics or Biblical Leadership, allowing them to complete a college degree for personal and career development. MCC also offers these two degree-completion programs through online distance education.

MCC programs of study can be taken in conjunction with numerous programs at Kansas State University allowing students to earn two bachelor's degrees in five years. Students may also choose to pursue a two-year associate degree or a one-year certificate.

== Athletics ==
The college offers many sports programs including men's and women's soccer, men's and women's basketball, women's volleyball, and men's and women's cross country which was recently added for the Fall 2025 season. In 2014, the college changed its athletics nickname from "Crusaders" to "Thunder." The program competes in the National Christian College Athletic Association Division II and is a member of the Midwest Christian College Conference. The Thunder Volleyball team won the 2025 NCCAA Division II National Championship.
