= Emmaus University =

US Christian university

- Former names: Emmaus Bible School (1941-1984), Emmaus Bible College (1984-2024)
- Type: Private university
- Established: 1941
- Affiliations: Open Brethren
- Religious affiliation: Plymouth Brethren
- President: Philip Boom
- Students: 198 (as of Fall 2021)
- Location: Dubuque, Iowa, United States; 42.509°N 90.706°W
- Campus: Urban
- Sporting affiliations: NCCAA – Midwest Christian College Conference
- Mascot: Eagle
- Website: www.emmaus.edu

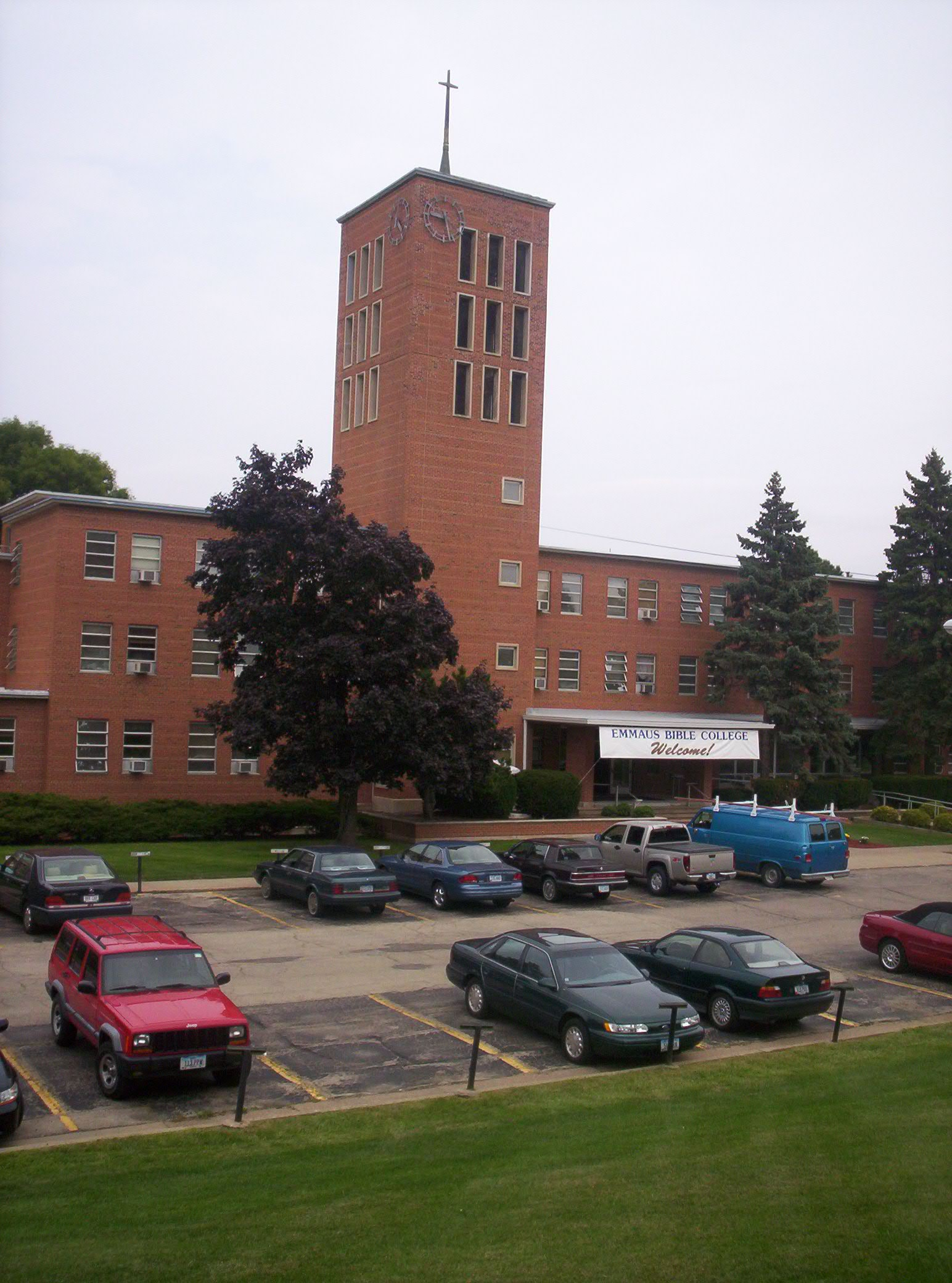
The front of Emmaus University

Emmaus University (formerly Emmaus Bible College) is a private Christian university in Dubuque, Iowa, United States, affiliated with the Plymouth Brethren. In keeping with its background as a Bible college, it offers double majors in both professional and biblical studies.

It was established as Emmaus Bible School in 1941 in Toronto, Ontario, by Ed Harlow, John Smart, and Ernest Tatham. Emmaus began offering correspondence courses a year later, with the target audience being military personnel. The institution relocated to Chicago, Illinois, in 1947. In 1984, it moved to Dubuque, Iowa and was renamed Emmaus Bible College. After launching a master's degree program through its Emmaus Global Campus in late 2024, the institution announced a name change to Emmaus University. The university is in a large facility that was formerly home of Aquinas Institute of Theology, a Roman Catholic institution.

== Accreditation and memberships ==
Emmaus has been a member of the Evangelical Training Association (ETA) since 1956. The university is accredited by the Association for Biblical Higher Education and the Higher Learning Commission. Emmaus is also a member of the Association of Christian Schools International and of the International Assembly for Collegiate Business Education.

One of its sister organizations, Emmaus Worldwide, offers bible-based correspondence courses in 105 countries and in 125 languages. Emmaus has had sister institutions in Israel, Switzerland and Australia.

== Student body ==
Emmaus is a small university, with about 200 students, most of whom are enrolled full-time. Around half of its students come from Brethren backgrounds, while the other half come from other evangelical backgrounds.

== Academics ==
Emmaus offers bachelor's degrees and associate degrees in Biblical and ministry-related fields as well as professional studies. In addition to its campus program, Emmaus offers a distance learning program that provides college credit for courses taken online. In late 2024, Emmaus launched a master's degree program in Bible and ministry, through the accredited, online Emmaus Global Campus.

== Athletics ==
The university offers men's and women's basketball, men's and women's cross country, men's soccer, and women's volleyball on the intercollegiate level. Emmaus competes in the Midwest Region of the National Christian College Athletic Association (NCCAA) division II. They also compete in the Midwest Christian College Conference.

== Transportation ==
The university is located west of downtown Dubuque and served by The Jule transit system. The Grey Route stops on Asbury Road and Chaney Road on the south and west sides of campus.
