= Calvary University =

Christian university in Kansas City, Missouri

- Motto: Biblical Equipping for Excellence in Life and Service
- Type: Private university
- Established: 1932
- Accreditation: ABHE, HLC
- President: Alexander Granados
- Undergraduates: 348 (late 2019)
- Postgraduates: 82 (late 2019)
- Location: Kansas City, Missouri, U.S. 38°50′18″N 94°32′40″W
- Campus: Suburban
- Colors: Crimson, white, gold
- Sporting affiliations: ACCA, MCCC
- Mascot: Nikao Warriors
- Website: www.calvary.edu

Calvary University is a private Christian university in Kansas City, Missouri, United States. In 2019, total enrollment was 430, with undergraduate enrollment of 348 and graduate enrollment of 82.

== History ==
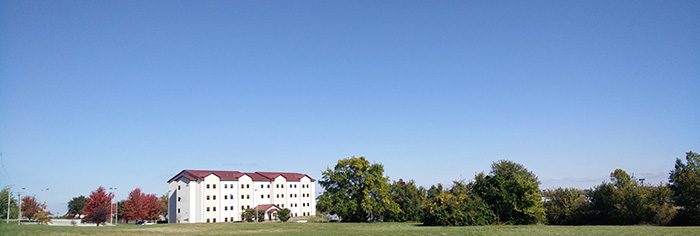
Calvary University campus on the former Richards-Gebaur Air Force Base

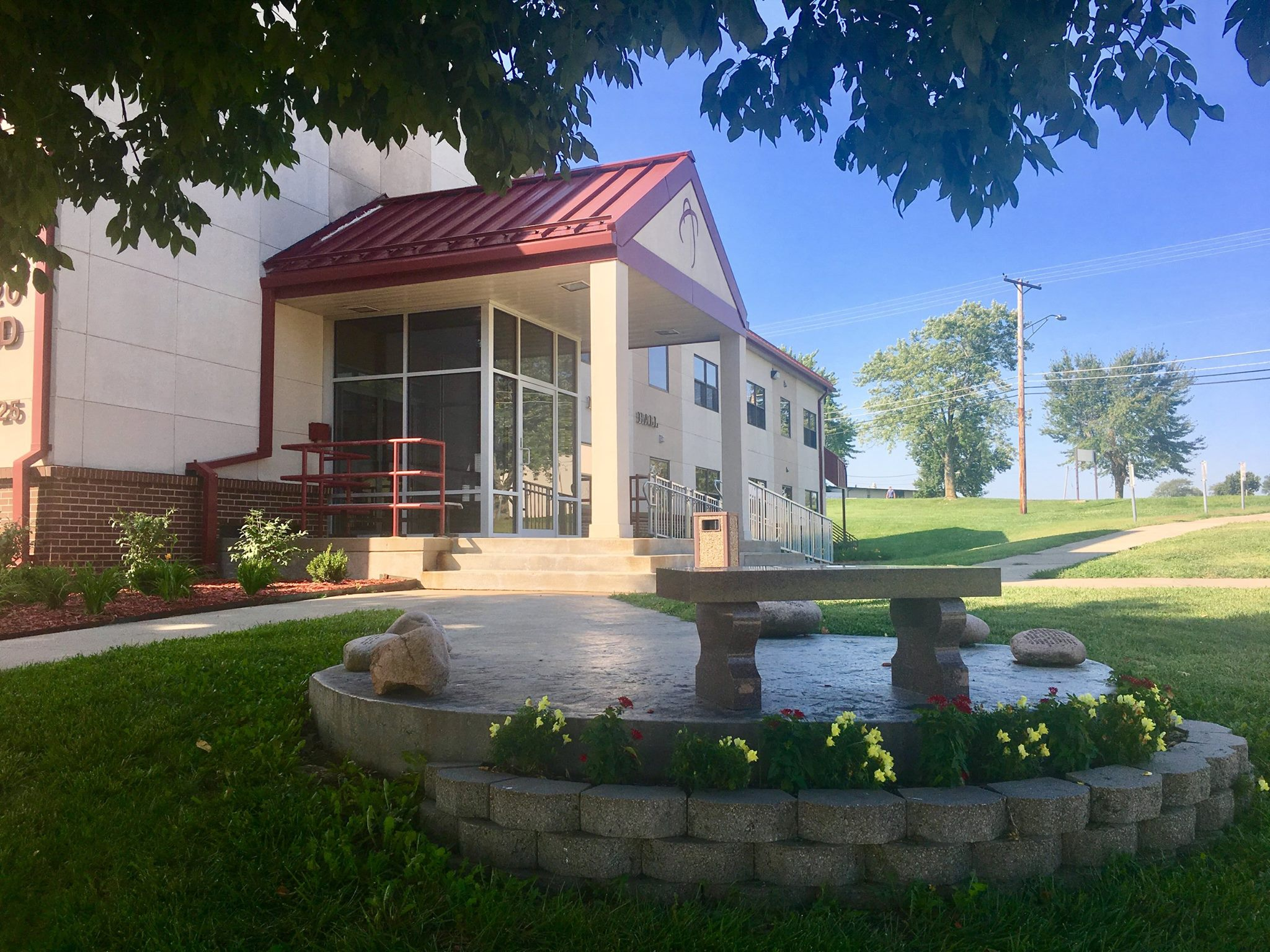
Madison Hall is the main administration building.

The university originally opened in 1932 as Calvary Bible College.

Calvary University is a result of a merger in 1961 between two small Bible colleges—Kansas City Bible College (est. 1932) and Midwest Bible College (est. 1938) in St. Louis. The two schools moved to a campus in the Kansas City suburban community of Prairie Village, Kansas, and became Calvary Bible College. In 1987, Citadel Bible College of Ozark, Arkansas merged in. In 1966, Calvary moved to 1111 West 39th Street in Kansas City, where it remained until 1980. In 1980 it moved to its current campus at the former Richards-Gebaur Air Force Base.

In mid-2016, Calvary re-branded as Calvary University. Reasons for the name change included the difficulty graduates were having with finding employment with a degree from a Bible college, the increased difficulty in accessing some countries for missions with a degree from a Bible college, the perception that a Bible college only prepares people for full-time church ministry, and the perception that a Bible college offers a lesser quality of education. Further, Calvary's mission, degree offerings, accreditation, and undergraduate and graduate divisions are all broader than the traditional Bible college classification.

== Academics ==
Calvary is accredited by the Higher Learning Commission (since 2003) and the Association for Biblical Higher Education (since 1947). In May 2023 the HLC issued a public disclosure notice to warn the public about the university's financial distress. In January 2024, the HLC issued a statement that the university now meets their requirements and does not appear to be in financial distress.

== Athletics ==
The Calvary Warriors offer sports for men's and women's basketball, men's soccer, women's volleyball, and men's baseball. In each of these sports the Warriors compete against other colleges in regular season games and post-season tournaments. The Warriors are members of the Midwest Christian College Conference (MCCC) and the Association of Christian College Athletics (ACCA).

The Warriors' men's soccer team took the ACCA national title in November 2012. The Warriors' men's basketball team won their first NCCAA North Region Championship to advance to the NCCAA DII National Championship tournament.
