= Bruce McAllister (administrator) =

Seventh president of Bob Jones University

M. Bruce McAllister
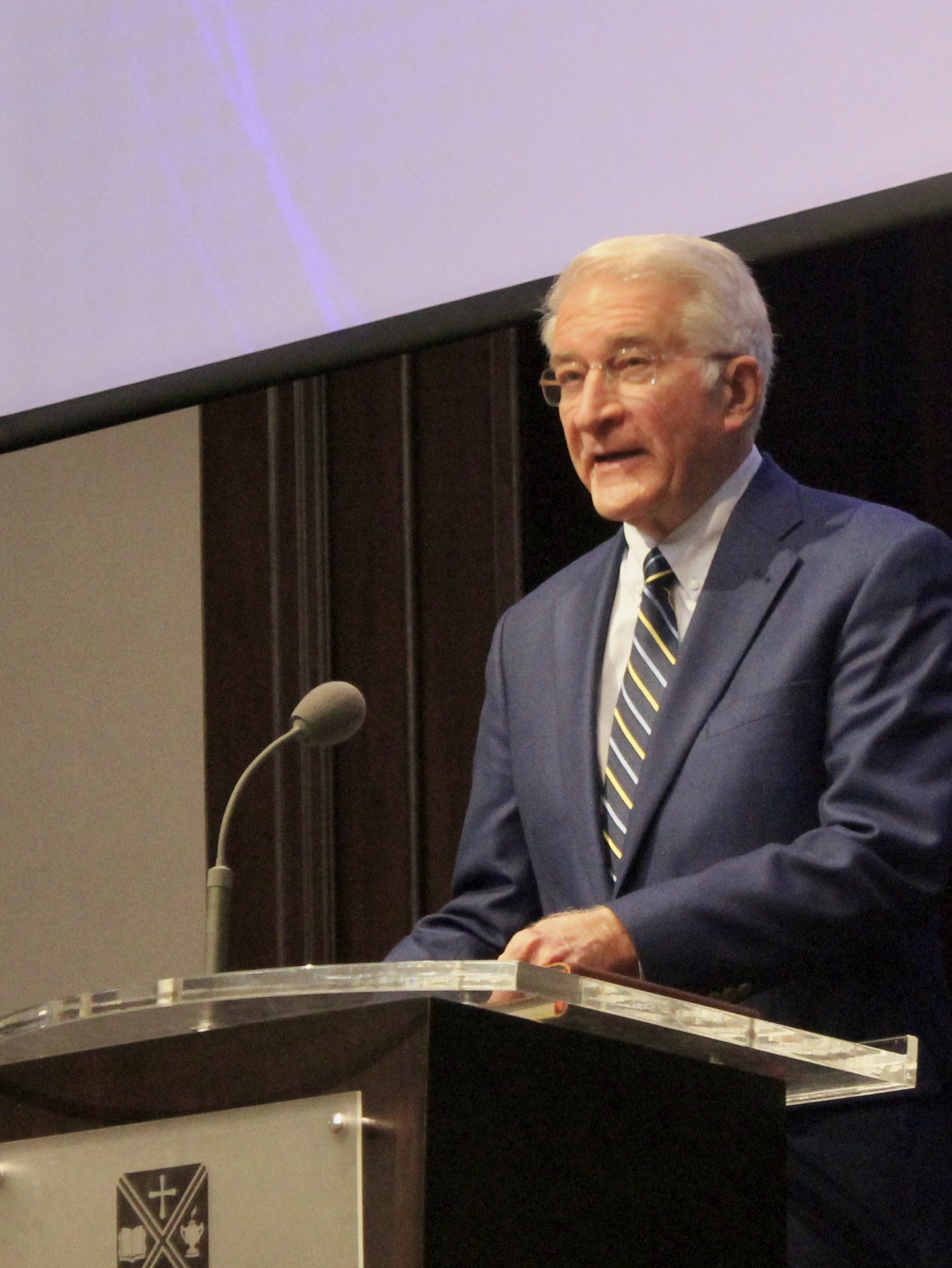
- Bruce McAllister, May 20, 2025

7th President of Bob Jones University
- Incumbent
- Assumed office May 2025
- Preceded by: Joshua Crockett

Personal details
- Born: November 27, 1954 (age 71) Savannah, Georgia
- Spouse: Ellen Gamble McAllister
- Children: 4
- Parent(s): Sybert Maurice McAllister, Jeanette Cheshire McAllister
- Education: Bob Jones University (BA, MA, MDiv, DMin)

Maurice Bruce McAllister (born November 27, 1954) is the seventh president of Bob Jones University.

Bruce McAllister was reared in a middle-class home in Decatur, Huntsville, and Hartselle, Alabama. He earned all his degrees at Bob Jones University: Bachelor of Arts in Bible Education, 1977, Master of Arts in Pastoral Studies, 1979, Master of Divinity, 1988, and Doctor of Ministry, 1995. As an undergraduate student, he was chaplain of the junior class and president of the senior class and of the University Ministerial Association.

McAllister spent most of his career in various roles at BJU, including Bible teacher at Bob Jones Academy, 1978–1983; Assistant to the Director of Ministerial Training and Extension, 1978–1991; Director of Ministerial Training and Outreach, 1991–2014; and Director of Pastor Relations, 2015–2019. As Director of Ministerial Training and Outreach, McAllister oversaw the university's church staff placement and referral service, its ministerial class and core ministry courses, as well as its student outreach ministries. He traveled widely, speaking at pastors' conferences and counseling pastors and Christian workers.

In April 1980, McAllister was ordained into the Christian ministry at Hampton Park Baptist Church, Greenville, South Carolina, and pastored two North Carolina churches during the 1980s and '90s. Since 2011, he has engaged in a preaching ministry to inmates at the Greenville County Detention Center.

From 2019 to 2024, McAllister served as Director of Ministry Relations at Gospel Fellowship Association Missions, where he assisted with church staffing and church planting.

In 2024, McAllister rejoined the BJU Administration, and before his selection as president, he held the title Vice President for Ministry, preaching and representing the University.

McAllister has written curricula on church planting, on high school preaching and leadership, and on successful Christian living. Two of his books were published by BJU Press.

== Personal life ==
McAllister is married to the former Ellen Gamble. They have four adult children and eight grandchildren.

Academic offices
Preceded by Joshua Crockett	President of Bob Jones University; 2025–present	Succeeded by incumbent
