= Ozark Christian College =

Private evangelical Christian college

Ozark Christian College and Lincoln Seminary
- Logo as of March 2024
- Former name: Ozark Bible College
- Motto: Training men and women for Christian service.
- Type: Private college
- Established: June 12, 1942 (Ozark Bible College) in Bentonville, Arkansas; 1946 moved to Joplin, Missouri; 1985 merged with Midwest Christian College
- Accreditation: Association for Biblical Higher Education
- Religious affiliation: Restoration Movement of Christian churches and churches of Christ
- President: Matt Proctor
- Students: 600
- Location: Joplin, Missouri, United States; 37°06′13″N 94°30′40″W
- Colors: Navy and white
- Sporting affiliations: ACCA – Midwest Christian College Conference
- Mascot: Ambassador
- Website: occ.edu

Ozark Christian College and Lincoln Seminary (OCC/LS) is a private evangelical Christian college. Established in 1942 in Bentonville, Arkansas, it moved to Joplin, Missouri in 1946. It is affiliated with the Restoration Movement of Christian Churches and Churches of Christ. It emphasizes vocational preparation for preaching, missionary, worship, youth, and children's ministers.

== Academics ==
As an institution of biblical higher education, Ozark Christian College prepares students to leave and serve in the church and other Christian ministries. A dual degree program with Missouri Southern State University lets students earn two bachelor's degrees—one from each college—to serve in various fields. OCC's hybrid master's program offers Christian ministry training at the graduate level. Ozark also offers an entire undergraduate degree online. Ozark is accredited by the Association for Biblical Higher Education and the Higher Learning Commission.

On June 1, 2024, Lincoln Christian Seminary, the embedded seminary of Lincoln Christian University, became Lincoln Seminary at Ozark Christian College. Lincoln Christian University was founded in 1944 in Lincoln, Illinois. Lincoln Christian Seminary was founded in 1952. After 80 years of training leaders in the church, LCU announced the cessation of all academic operations on May 31, 2024, and the gifting of the seminary to OCC.

Lincoln Seminary at OCC is accredited by The Association of Theological Schools.

== Athletics ==
Ozark's varsity sports teams are known as the Ambassadors, a name taken from the Bible (2 Corinthians 5:20). Athletics include basketball, cross country, men's soccer, and women's volleyball. Varsity teams are members of the Association of Christian College Athletics, the Midwest Christian College Conference, and the National Christian College Athletic Association Division II. Non-varsity, intramural sports include Ultimate Frisbee, soccer, volleyball, and basketball. Ozark's Multi-Purpose Building offers students a full-size basketball/volleyball floor, indoor walking/running area, weight room, cardio room, locker rooms, and theater seating. The campus also includes outdoor basketball goals, tennis and Pickleball courts, a sand volleyball pit, and a soccer field.
