= Faith Baptist Bible College and Theological Seminary =

Religious college in Iowa

- Former names: Omaha Bible Institute; Omaha Baptist Bible Institute; Omaha Baptist Bible College
- Motto: With the Word to the World
- Type: Bible college and seminary
- Established: 1921
- President: Jim Tillotson
- Faculty: 42
- Students: Approximately 500 undergraduate students
- Location: Ankeny, Iowa, United States; 41.737°N 93.625°W
- Campus: Suburban
- Colors: Maroon and Gray
- Sporting affiliations: ACCA – Midwest Christian College Conference
- Website: www.faith.edu

Faith Baptist Bible College and Theological Seminary is a private Christian college and seminary in Ankeny, Iowa, United States.

== History ==
=== Early Omaha years ===
At the 1893 World's Fair in Chicago, William H. Jordan heard Dwight L. Moody speak about the importance of training students for the Christian ministry. Impressed by Moody's vision, Jordan became concerned about establishing schools to carry out such an objective. As pastor of Third Presbyterian Church in Omaha, Nebraska, Jordan founded Omaha Bible Institute (OBI) in 1921 to educate men and women in the Bible, theology, and ministry. OBI was legally incorporated on January 14, 1924. Jordan served the institute for the next thirty-one years, first as president until September 4, 1942, and then as chairman of the board until resigning on May 19, 1952.

From 1942 to 1947, the institute had a series of deans including Harold A. Wilson, Ralph C. Nelson, Paul Sawtell, and Albert Schultz. On March 16, 1947, Paul Sawtell was named the institute's acting president and John L. Patten was named acting dean. Later in March, the board of directors met to answer the question: "Shall we continue to keep the school, or shall we sell the property, clear the debt, and let the students go to other Bible institutes and colleges?"

The next evening, only John L. Patten, pastor of the Grace Baptist Church in Omaha, and the institute's dean of women, H. Nell Malen, expressed the need for the school to continue. Both "contended that the Midwest area needed a school that would teach fundamental, Biblical Christianity and complete separation from and not compromise with modernism in any form."

Since Paul Sawtell expressed his wish not to continue as acting president, John L. Patten, acting dean, was named by the board as president as of June 1, 1947. Patten then served as president for the next eighteen years until his resignation for health reasons, effective May 31, 1965. As president emeritus, he continued to teach at the college until his health forced his full retirement in 1975.

As pastor of the Grace Baptist Church in Omaha, Patten, prior to becoming institute president, had led his church to affiliate with the General Association of Regular Baptist Churches (GARBC). Feeling strongly that the Institute needed a denominational affiliation for continuing support, he succeeded in the institute's becoming affiliated with the GARBC as of April 28, 1952. Accordingly, in board action on August 1, 1953, OBI initiated legal action to change its name to the Omaha Baptist Bible Institute (OBBI).

On April 25, 1960, the institute's board of directors authorized the board's executive committee to take legal steps to change the institute's name again to the Omaha Baptist Bible College (OBBC) in order to reflect its status as a degree granting institution. On November 5, 1964, the college was notified of its accreditation by the Accreditation Association of Bible Colleges.

=== Move to Ankeny, Iowa ===
By 1965, the campus in Omaha had become overcrowded. In addition to the original townhouse located on Park Avenue and a metal, quonset building built at the back of the property, a new building had been built on Park Avenue and a second building built on Pacific Street at the back of the college property. The college's board unanimously voted to move the college to an undeveloped thirty acres located in the northwestern section of Ankeny, Iowa, now a suburb of Des Moines, Iowa's state capital. Later, on June 1, 1965, the board appointed David Nettleton, formerly pastor of the Grand View Baptist Church, Des Moines, as college president.

In moving to Ankeny in the summer of 1967, Comstock Avenue, the street at the front of the new college property, was changed to College Avenue. The first buildings to be built were the college Administration building and a multipurpose building. One of the next buildings added to the new campus was the library, originally built as the college's library and as classrooms. The building has since been totally taken over by the library and named Patten Hall, in honor of FBBC's president of eighteen years, Dr. John L. Patten.

By October 1, 1967, two hundred and sixty-seven students were enrolled at the college's new campus. Faced with the need for a new name for the college that already had two name changes, the name ultimately chosen for the college at its new location was Faith Baptist Bible College.

In 1982, Faith offered its first graduate program, a Master of Arts in pastoral studies. Faith Baptist Theological Seminary began in 1986, merging with Denver Baptist Bible College.

=== Presidents ===
| No. | Name | Term | Ref |
Omaha Baptist Bible Institute/College (Omaha, NE)
| 1 | William H. Jordan | 1921–1931 | |
| 2 | Chester E. Tulga | 1931–1932 | |
| – | William H. Jordan | 1932–1942 | |
| – (Note: Morse was acting head of the institute as dean.) | George Byron Morse | 1942–1943 | |
| 3 | Paul W. Sawtell | 1943–1946 | |
| – (Note: Schultz was acting head of the institute as dean.) | Albert Schultz | 1946–1947 | |
| – (Note: Served as acting president) | Paul W. Sawtell | 1947 | |
| 4 | John L. Patten | 1947–1965 | |
Faith Baptist Bible College (Ankeny, IA)
| 5 | David Nettleton | 1965–1980 | |
| – (Note: Served as interim president) | Donald Brong | 1980 | |
| 6 | Gordon L. Shipp | 1980–1987 | |
| – | Donald Brong | 1987 | |
| 7 | Robert L. Domokos | 1987–1993 | |
| – | David R. Boylan | 1993–1994 | |
| 8 | Richard W. Houg | 1994–2006 | |
| – | John Hartog III | 2005–2007 (Note: Hartog served as interim president when Houg took a leave of absence in 2005 before retiring in 2006.) | |
| 9 | James D. Maxwell III | 2007–2013 | |
| – | Ernest J. Schmidt | 2013–2015 | |
| 10 | Jim Tillotson | 2015–present | |

== Campus ==
Faith's campus is located in Ankeny, a suburb of Des Moines. At the time of its construction, the campus was the westernmost point in Ankeny. Within fifteen years, residential development surrounded the property.

The campus is built around a large center circle. It consists of 24 buildings. Some of them are:

- Jordan Hall (1967) — administrative offices; formerly known as the Administration Building; renamed for the school's founder William H. Jordan, in honor of the school's 90th anniversary on September 28, 2011
- Benson Hall (1967) — dining hall, college classrooms
- Patten Hall (1969) — 60,000-volume library, education resource center, classrooms
- Nettleton Center (1974/2006) — 1,500-seat gymnasium, locker rooms, weight & fitness room, athletic office, student life department, student center, bookstore, music room, health center, classrooms; formerly called the Convocation Building; renamed for Dr. David Nettleton, the president of the college from 1965 to 1980
- Gray Hall (1970)—classrooms, computer lab, science lab, Instructional Media Center
- Maintenance Building
- Brong Hall (2005)—Women's dorm, opened in 1999.
- Taylor Hall (2005)—Men's dorm, opened in 1999.
- 422—Women's dorm
- Crown Park (2014)
- Shipp Hall (2017)—Seminary building, seminary faculty, dedicated in honor of Dr. Gordon Shipp.
- Domokos Hall (2019) —named after Dr. Robert Domokos (known as Dr. Bob) who served the school as a president from 1987 to 1993. The building houses the faculty, the music department, and the IT department.

== Accreditation and affiliations ==
Faith Baptist Bible College and Theological Seminary is accredited by the Higher Learning Commission of the North Central Association of Colleges and Schools and by the Association for Biblical Higher Education. The institution also maintains membership in the American Association of Christian Colleges and Seminaries.

== Athletics ==
Faith Baptist Bible College is a member the National Christian College Athletic Association (NCCAA) Division 2. They are part of the North Central Region with Providence University College and Theological Seminary, North Central University, and Trinity Bible College. The Eagles compete in 7 sports: women's volleyball, men's and women's soccer, men's and women's basketball, track and field, and cross-country. The Eagles also compete in the Midwest Christian College Conference.
