= Midwest Christian College Conference =

College athletics body in the USA

- No. of teams: 7
- Headquarters: Joplin, Missouri
- Region: Iowa, Kansas, Missouri

The Midwest Christian College Conference is a college athletic conference that is a member of the National Christian College Athletic Association (NCCAA) and the Association of Christian College Athletics (ACCA) in the United States.

== Schools ==
| School | Location |
|---|---|
| Barclay College | Haviland, Kansas |
| Calvary University | Kansas City, Missouri |
| Central Bible University | Moberly, Missouri |
| Emmaus University | Dubuque, Iowa |
| Faith Baptist Bible College | Ankeny, Iowa |
| Manhattan Christian College | Manhattan, Kansas |
| Ozark Christian College | Joplin, Missouri |

=== Former members ===
- Saint Louis Christian College
- Central Bible College
- Covenant College
- Grace University
- Nebraska Christian College
- Vennard College

== Sports offered ==
The conference offers two sports for men's competition and two sports for women's competition. Both men's and women's basketball are sponsored in addition to men's soccer and women's volleyball.

=== Men's basketball ===
    Year      Conference Champion              Tournament Champion              Sportsmanship Award
  1962-63         Manhattan                        Calvary
  1963-64         Covenant                         Manhattan
  1964-65         Calvary                          Omaha (Faith)
  1965-66         Calvary                          Calvary
  1966-67         Ozark                            Ozark                               Omaha (Faith)          
  1967-68         Ozark                            Grace                               Faith               
  1968-69         Ozark                            Ozark                               Calvary
  1969-70         Grace                            Grace                               Faith/Grace
  1970-71         Ozark                            Grace                               Central/Faith
  1971-72         Faith/Grace                      Faith                               Faith/Grace
  1972-73         Friends (Barclay)                Friends (Barclay)                   Faith
  1973-74         Faith                            Faith                               Friends (Barclay)          
  1974-75         Faith                            Manhattan                           Grace
  1975-76         Faith/Grace                      Grace                               Faith/Grace
  1976-77         Faith                            Faith                               Central
  1977-78         Grace                            Grace                               Central
  1978-79         Calvary                          Friends (Barclay)                   Friends (Barclay)
  1979-80         Calvary                          Manhattan                           Grace
  1980-81         Calvary                          Calvary                             Grace
  1981-82         Calvary                          Calvary                             Friends (Barclay)
  1982-83         Calvary/Grace                    Grace                               Calvary
  1983-84         Grace                            Grace                               Grace
  1984-85         Grace                            Grace                               Calvary
  1985-86         Calvary                          Calvary                             Calvary
  1986-87         Friends (Barclay)                Friends (Barclay)                   Faith
  1987-88         Calvary                          Nebraska                            Calvary
  1988-89         Calvary                          Calvary                             Grace
  1989-90         Calvary                          Calvary                             Grace
  1990-91         Calvary                          Grace                               Calvary
  1991-92         Grace                            Calvary                             Grace
  1992-93         Grace                            Grace                               Grace                                
  1993-94         Grace                            Grace                               Grace 
  1994-95         Grace/Nebraska                   Grace                               Nebraska
  1995-96         Nebraska                         Nebraska                            Nebraska 
  1996-97         Nebraska                         Manhattan                           Central
  1997-98         Grace                            Faith                               Manhattan/Nebraska
  1998-99         Manhattan                        Manhattan                           Grace
  1999-00         Grace                            Ozark                               Ozark
  2000-01         Manhattan/Ozark                  Ozark                               Grace
  2001-02         Manhattan                        Manhattan                           Grace/Ozark
  2002-03         Manhattan                        Manhattan                           Grace
  2003-04         Manhattan/Grace                  Grace                               Grace
  2004-05         Grace                            Grace                               Grace
  2005-06         Manhattan/Ozark                  Grace                               Vennard
  2006-07         Grace/Manhattan                  Grace                               Ozark
  2007-08         Grace/Manhattan                  Manhattan                           Calvary
  2008-09         Manhattan                        Manhattan                           Ozark
  2009-10         Manhattan                        no tournament                       Calvary
  2010-11         Ozark/Barclay/Manhattan          no tournament                       Manhattan
  2011-12         Manhattan                        no tournament                       Ozark
  2012-13         Manhattan                        Ozark                               Ozark
  2013-14         Manhattan                        Manhattan                           Faith
  2014-15         Faith                            Faith                               Ozark/Faith
  2015-16         Barclay                          Manhattan                           Faith
  2016-17         Manhattan                        Manhattan                           Ozark
  2017-18         Central                          Ozark                               Faith
  2018-19         Ozark                            Ozark                               Faith
  2019-20         Manhattan                        Faith                               Faith
  2020-21         Barclay                          Manhattan                           Faith
  2021-22         Manhattan                        Manhattan                           Faith
  2022-23         Manhattan                        Manhattan                           Faith
  2023-24         Manhattan                        Ozark                               Faith
  2024-25         Manhattan/Ozark                  Ozark                               Faith
  2025-26         Faith                            Manhattan                           
    
       ALL CONFERENCE TEAMS
 1964-65     Rathburn       Omaha (Faith)
             Collins        Omaha (Faith)
             Dewald         Calvary
             Person         Calvary
             Kidd           Manhattan
             Pemberton      Calvary

 1965-66     Lowe   MVP     Calvary
             Hyllberg       Central Bible
             Rathburn       Omaha (Faith)
             Edwards        Manhattan
             Bauerfeld      Calvary
             Stein          Central Christian

 1966-67     Stein   MVP    Central Christian
             Edwards        Manhattan
             Pemberton      Calvary
             Robinson       Ozark
             McPeck         Ozark

 1967–68

 1968-69    Ensz   CO-MVP   Grace
            Sharp  CO-MVP   Ozark

 1969-70    VanDeusen  MVP  Manhattan
            Sharp           Ozark
            Ensz            Grace
            Wilson          Manhattan
            Reimer          Grace

 1970-71    Sharp  MVP      Ozark
            Stauffer        Ozark
            Thompson        Faith
            Wiebe           Grace
            Reimer          Grace

 1971-72   Reimer   MVP     Grace
           Farlow           Faith
           Thompson         Faith
           Hardee           Calvary
           Pratt            Manhattan

 1972-73   Farlow   MVP     Faith
           Theolbald        Manhattan
           Westby           Grace
           Nickel           Grace

 1973-74   Nickel     MVP   Grace
           Smith            Friends (Barclay)
           Lanzen           Faith
           Tucker           Friends (Barclay)
           Westby           Grace

 1974-75   Nickel    MVP    Grace
           Theobald         Manhattan
           Lanzen           Faith
           Boswell          Friends (Barclay)
           Mallette         Central Christian

 1975-76   Theobald   MVP   Manhattan
           Wiens            Grace
           Townsend         Faith
           Lanzen           Faith
           Harder           Grace

 1976–77

 1977-78   Lahm    MVP      Nebraska
           Wymer            Faith
           Sprouls          Manhattan
           Guhr             Grace
           Talyor           Manhattan

 1978-79   Bohall   MVP     Nebraska
           Wymer            Faith  
           Powers           Friends (Barclay)
           Nolen            Friends (Barclay)
           Schneeberger     Calvary

 1979-80   Schneeberger MVP Calvary
           Lahm             Nebraska
           Jefferson        Faith
           S. Dick          Grace
           Entz             Grace

 1980-81   Schneeberger MVP Calvary
           Burton           Central
           Boettcher        Friends (Barclay)
           Ferneau          Central
           Sailer           Calvary

 1981-82   Burton    MVP    Central
           Schneeberger     Calvary
           Painter          Calvary
           Ferneau          Central
           Sperling         Grace

 1982-83   Dalton   MVP     Calvary
           Rucker           Central
           Thiessen         Grace
           Thompson         Faith
           Helten           Faith

 1983-84   Nachtigal  MVP   Grace
           Chitwood         Nebraska
           White            Friends (Barclay)
           Wagner           Grace
           Thompson         Faith

 1984-85   Christenson MVP  Friends (Barclay)
           Nachtigal        Grace
           Davis            Friends (Barclay)
           Wagner           Grace
           Spicer           Calvary

 1985-86   Wagner    MVP    Grace
           Davis            Friends (Barclay)
           Justice          Nebraska
           Betz             Faith'
           Smith            Calvary

 1986-87   Dixon   CO-MVP   Calvary
           Christenson CO-MVP Friends (Barclay)
           Betz              Faith
           Classen           Grace
           Davis             Friends (Barclay)
           Justice           Nebraska

 1987-88   Dixon     MVP     Calvary
           Davis             Friends (Barclay)
           Classen           Grace
           Ballard           Faith
           Miratsky          Grace

 1988-89   Classen  CO-MVP   Grace
           Ballard  CO-MVP   Faith
           Loewer            Calvary
           Ballard           Nebraska
           Miratsky          Grace

 1989-90   Classen   MVP     Grace
           Loewer            Calvary
           Kissack           Nebraska
           Steelman          Manhattan
           Roher             Friends (Barclay)
           Miratsky          Grace

 1990-91   Roher    MVP      Friends (Barclay)
           Millermon         Calvary
           Loewer            Calvary
           Ridpath           Nebraska
           Steelman          Manhattan

 1991-92   Kissack   MVP     Nebraska
           Loewer            Calvary
           Widman            Grace
           Smith             Grace
           Liebenthal        Grace

 1992-93   Smith     MVP     Grace
           Renner            Manhattan
           Liebenthal        Grace
           Widman            Grace
           Head              Calvary

 1993-94   Liebenthal  MVP   Grace
           Eubanks           Manhattan
           Evans             Nebraska
           Terpstra          Faith

 1994-95   Isaacs     MVP    Manhattan
           Evans             Nebraska
           Beckenhauer       Nebraska
           Nanniga           Grace
           Terpstra          Faith

 1995-96   Beckenhauer  MVP  Nebraska
           Isaacs            Manhattan
           Bazil             Manhattan
           Mattox            Grace
           Terpstra          Faith

 1996-97   Bazil     MVP     Manhattan
           Olsen             Nebraska
           Wilson            Grace
           Beckenhauer       Nebraska
           Terpstra          Faith

 1997-98   Wilson   CO-MVP   Grace
           Olsen    CO-MVP   Nebraska
           Easley            Central
           Schmidt           Grace
           Van Donge         Manhattan

 1998-99   Olsen    MVP      Nebraska
           Wilson            Grace
           VAn Donge         Manhattan
           Hahn              Manhattan
           Schmidt           Grace

 1999-00   Tarlton   MVP     Ozark
           Hahn              Manhattan
           Jordon            Grace
           Renfro            Nebraska
           Bredeholf         Nebraska

 2000-01   Jordon     MVP    Grace
           Martens           Manhattan
           Turner            Ozark
           Courter           Manhattan
           Bates             Manhattan
           Busenitz          Calvary

 2001-02   Martens    MVP    Manhattan
           Jordon            Grace
           Kluttz            Manhattan
           Aderson           Ozark
           Stoker            Nebraska

=== Volleyball ===
  Year                     Conference Champion                  Tournament Champion
  1977                                                                Faith
  1978                                                                Faith
  1979                                                                Friends (Barclay)
  1980                                                                Grace
  1981                                                                Friends (Barclay)
  1982                                                                Calvary
  1983                                                                Grace
  1984                        Faith                                   Faith
  1985                        Grace                                   Grace
  1986                        Grace                                   Grace
  1987                        Faith                                   Faith
  1988                        Calvary/Grace                           Calvary
  1989                        Calvary                                 Calvary
  1990                        Calvary                                 Calvary
  1991                        Calvary/Manhattan                       Calvary
  1992                        Faith                                   Manhattan
  1993                        Manhattan                               Manhattan
  1994                        Faith                                   Faith
  1995                        Faith                                   Faith
  1996                        Faith                                   Faith
  1997                        Grace                                   Faith
  1998                        Faith                                   Faith
  1999                        Manhattan                               Manhattan
  2000                        Ozark                                   Ozark
  2001                        Ozark                                   Grace
  2002                        Nebraska                                Nebraska
  2003                        Nebraska/Ozark                          Ozark
  2004                        Grace                                   Ozark
  2005                        Grace                                   Grace
  2006                        Grace                                   Grace
  2007                        Grace                                   Grace
  2008                        Manhattan                               Manhattan
  2009                        Manhattan                               no tournament
  2010                        Ozark                                   no tournament
  2011                        Ozark                                   no tournament
  2012                        Manhattan                               Manhattan
  2013                        Manhattan                               Manhattan
  2014                        Ozark                                   Ozark
  2015                        Manhattan                               Manhattan
  2016                        Manhattan                               Ozark
  2017                        Emmaus                                  Emmaus
  2018                        Emmaus                                  Emmaus
  2019                        Manhattan                               Manhattan
  2020                        Manhattan                               Manhattan
  2021                        Manhattan                               Manhattan
  2022                        Manhattan                               Manhattan
  2023                        Manhattan                               Manhattan
  2024                        Manhattan                               Manhattan
  2025                        Manhattan                               Manhattan

=== Women's basketball ===
  Year                   Conference Champion                  Tournament Champion
  1989                         Calvary
  1990                         Calvary/Faith
  1991                         Faith
  1992                         Grace                                
  1993                         Grace                                  Grace
  1994                         Grace                                  Grace
  1995                         Grace                                  Calvary
  1996                         Grace                                  Grace
  1997                         Faith                                  Faith
  1998                         Faith                                  Grace
  1999                         Faith                                  Nebraska
  2000                         Manhattan                              Ozark
  2001                         Ozark                                  Grace
  2002                         Ozark                                  Manhattan
  2003                         Manhattan                              Ozark
  2004                         Manhattan                              Ozark
  2005                         Manhattan                              Manhattan
  2006                         Manhattan                              Manhattan
  2007                         Manhattan                              Ozark
  2008                         Ozark                                  Ozark
  2009                         Manhattan                              Manhattan
  2010                         Manhattan                              no tournament
  2011                         Manhattan                              no tournament
  2012                         Central                                no tournament
  2013                         Manhattan                              Manhattan
  2014                         Manhattan                              Manhattan
  2015                         Central                                Central
  2016                         Emmaus                                 Emmaus
  2017                         Emmaus                                 Emmaus
  2018                         Manhattan                              Manhattan
  2019                         Emmaus                                 Emmaus
  2020                         Emmaus                                 Emmaus
  2021                         Barclay                                Ozark
  2022                         Ozark                                  Ozark
  2023                         Ozark                                  Ozark
  2024                         Ozark                                  Ozark
  2025                         Ozark                                  Faith
  2026                         Calvary                                Calvary

=== Men's soccer ===
  Year                     Conference Champion                  Tournament Champion
  1990                         Manhattan                             Calvary
  1991                         Manhattan                             Manhattan
  1992                         Manhattan                             Manhattan
  1993                         Manhattan                             Calvary
  1994                         Manhattan                             Manhattan
  1995                         Faith/Manhattan                       Manhattan
  1996                         Faith/Manhattan                       Manhattan
  1997                         Barclay                               Barclay
  1998                         Manhattan                             Manhattan'
  1999                         Manhattan                             Barclay/Manhattan
  2000                         Manhattan                             Barclay
  2001                         Ozark                                 Manhattan
  2002                         Grace                                 Manhattan
  2003                         Manhattan                             Manhattan
  2004
  2005
  2006
  2007
  2008                        Manhattan                              Manhattan
  2009                        Manhattan                              no tournament
  2010                        Manhattan                              no tournament
  2011                        Manhattan                              no tournament
  2012                        Manhattan                              no tournament
  2013                        Barclay/Manhattan/Ozark                Manhattan
  2014                        Barclay                                Barclay
  2015                        Ozark                                  Manhattan
  2016                        Ozark                                  Ozark
  2017                        Manhattan                              Manhattan
  2018                        Emmaus                                 Emmaus
  2019                        Manhattan                              Manhattan
  2020                        Manhattan                              Manhattan
  2021                        Manhattan                              Manhattan
  2022                        Manhattan                              Faith
  2023                        Faith                                  Faith
  2024                        Barclay                                Barclay
  2025                        Central                                Central
