= Alumni Stadium (BJU) =

Athletics stadium in Greenville, South Carolina

Coordinates: 34.871000°N 82.362500°W

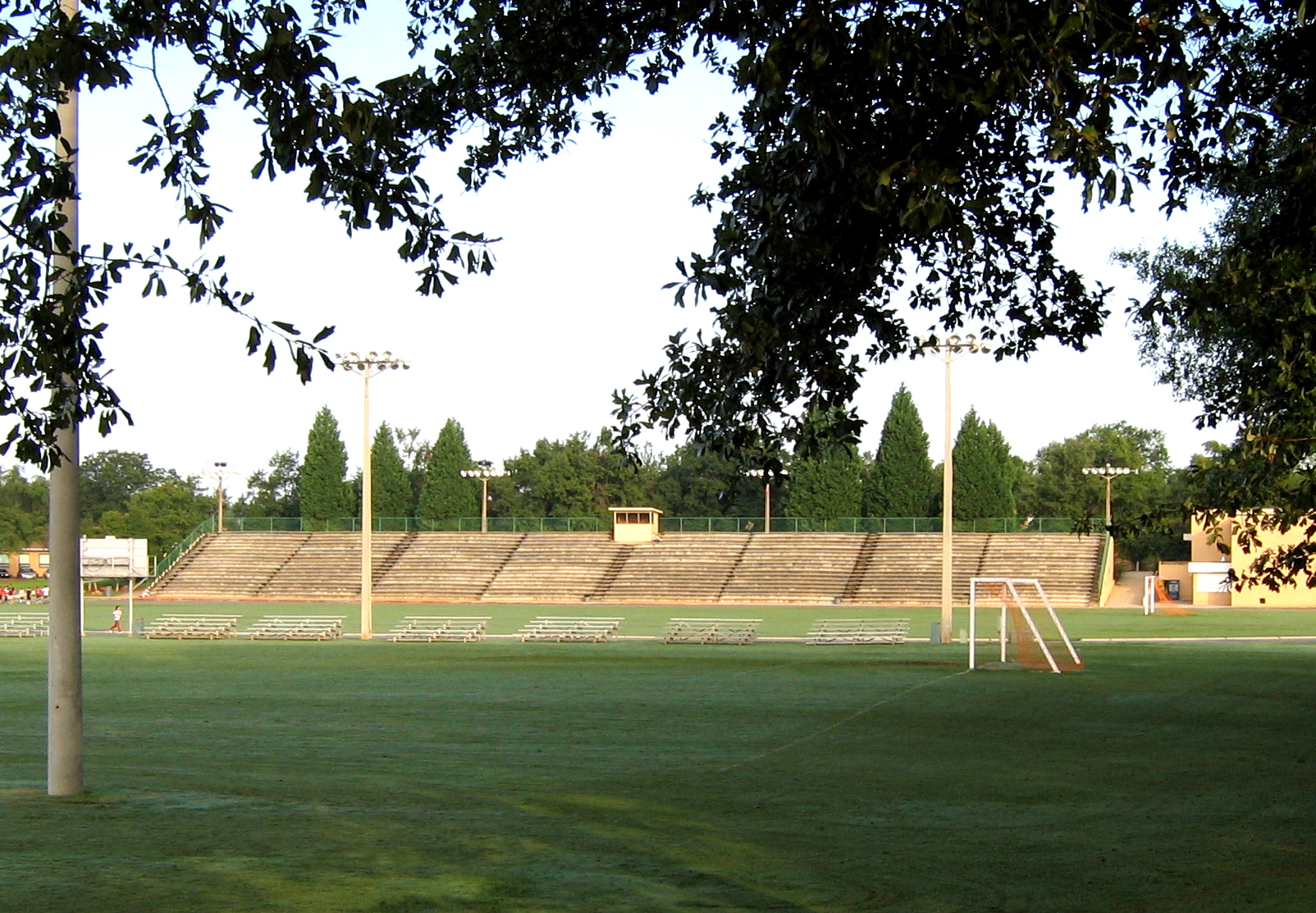
- Interactive map of Alumni Stadium
- Location: Greenville, South Carolina
- Owner: Bob Jones University
- Operator: Bob Jones University
- Capacity: 4,000
- Surface: Grass, Athletic Track

Construction
- Opened: 1968

Tenant
- Bob Jones University (Intramural)

Alumni Stadium is the athletics stadium at Bob Jones University, a Protestant fundamentalist university in Greenville, South Carolina. The stadium, completed in 1968, was a gift of the BJU Alumni Association and seats 4,000 in a single stand situated along the north sideline. Its bleachers are constructed of prestressed concrete beams with seats of anodized aluminum. In 1992, an outdoor concession area was included as part of the adjoining Fremont Fitness Center.

The University abolished intercollegiate athletics in 1933. Except for a few exhibition games, only intramural sports were played in the stadium until the 2012-13 school year when intercollegiate soccer was introduced. The stadium continues to be used for intramural athletics and occasionally for other non-athletic events.
