= Davis Field House =

Gymnasium in Greenville, South Carolina

Coordinates: 34°52′21″N 82°21′43″W

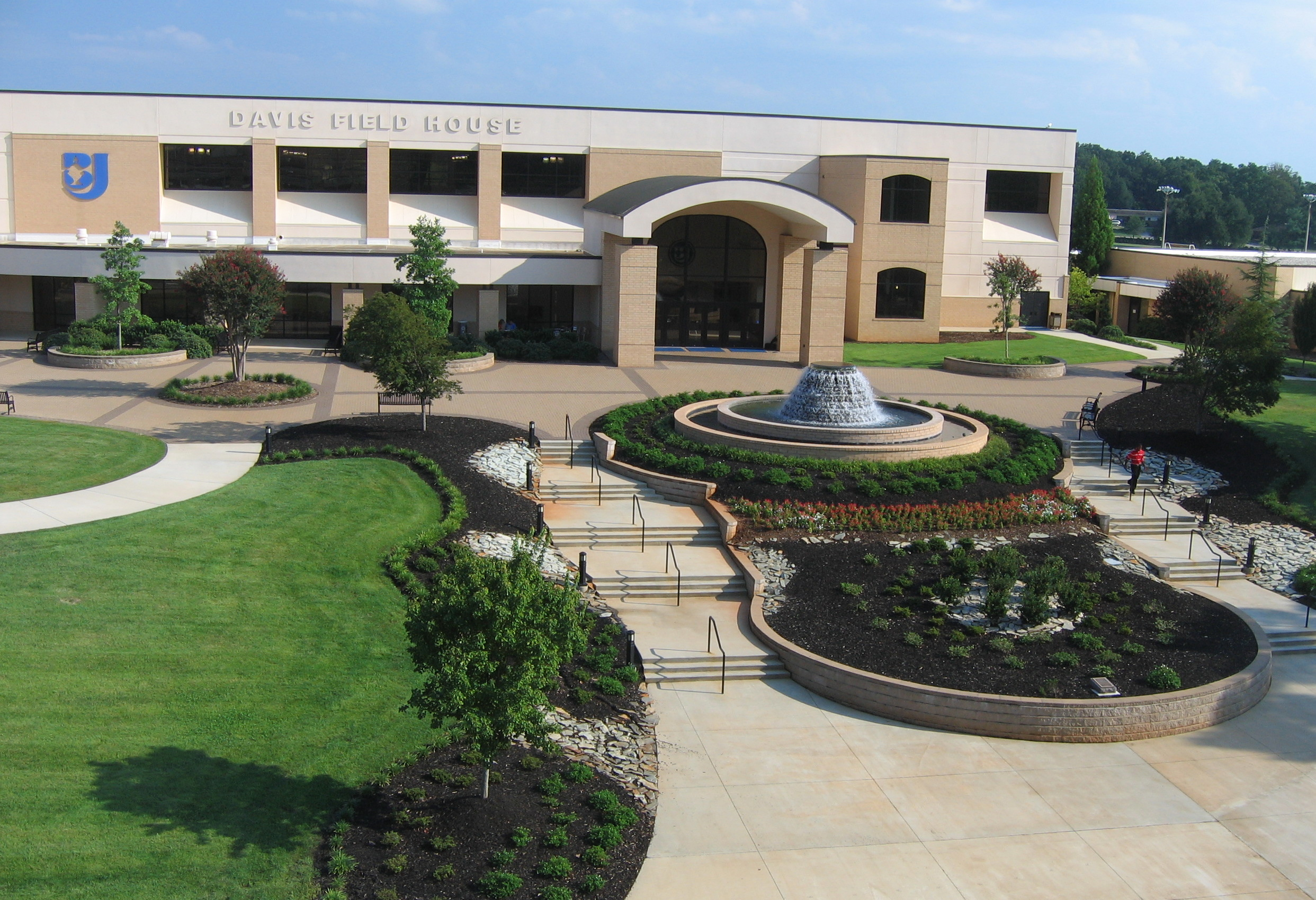
Davis Field House

The Davis Field House is the gymnasium of Bob Jones University, Greenville, South Carolina. The field house is a 90,000-square-foot (8,400 m^{2}) facility with a main court seating 3,000. The gym is used for intramural athletic basketball and volleyball games as well as other activities. The field house features a suspended running track circling the courts and includes a swimming pool and classrooms for the BJU Division of Physical Education and Exercise Science.
