= List of Harvard Extension School alumni =

The following is a list of notable alumni of the Harvard Extension School.

== Business ==
- Rory Cowan, ABE ’79 - CEO, Lionbridge Technologies Inc
- Robert Maginn, ALM ’81 - CEO and Chairman of the Board of Directors, Jenzabar Inc.
- Sal Perisano, ALM ’87 - CEO and Chairman, iParty
- Ekaterina Rybolovleva - Owner of football club AS Monaco FC
- Oreoluwa Lesi - Founder and executive director of Women's Technology Empowerment Centre
- Armando Gutierrez
- Ria Cheruvu, ALB '18, ALM '20 - AI Deep Learning Researcher at Intel Corporation

== Arts and media ==
- Jenny Allard, ALM '99 - sportswoman
- Allan Crite, ABE '68 - artist
- Robelyn Garcia, GC '20 - sportswoman, writer, author, and Arizona State University faculty
- Christine Leunens, ALM '05 - novelist
- Rosy Lamb - sculptor, painter and author
- Tahnee Ahtoneharjo - artist, regalia maker, curator

== Film, theater, and television ==
- Ryan Slattery, ALB ’09 - film and television actor, writer, producer
- Hilary Duff, ALB - film and television actor, singer
- Diane Neal, AA '18 - American actress and U.S. Congressional Candidate

== Academia ==
- Latanya Sweeney, ALB ’95 - Professor of Government and Technology in Residence at Harvard University, Faculty Dean in Currier House at Harvard
- A. Breeze Harper ALM '07 - critical race feminist, diversity strategist, and author
- Paul Reid, ALB ’90 - writer and biographer
- Nemat Sadat, ALM '10 - LGBTI rights activist, former professor of political science at American University of Afghanistan
- Danny Yamashiro, ALM '17 - Chaplain at Massachusetts Institute of Technology (MIT) and researcher on American presidents and childhood trauma

== Government ==
- Chester A. Dolan Jr. - President of the Massachusetts Senate (1949) and Member of the Massachusetts House of Representatives
- George Helmy, ALM - United States Senator from New Jersey
- Francisco Santos Calderón, CSS - Vice President, Republic of Colombia
- Bradley Jones Jr, AA ’87, ALB ’88 - Massachusetts House Minority Leader
- Bruce Ayers - 1st Norfolk District in the Massachusetts House of Representatives
- Joseph R. Paolino, Jr., ALM '89 - Ambassador to Malta
- Mauricio Escanero, ALM - Ambassador and Head of the Mission of Mexico to the European Union
- Scott Taylor, ALB '14, ALM - U.S. Representative for Virginia's 2nd congressional district
- Álvaro Uribe, CSS ’93 - 56th President of Colombia
- Brian Mast, ALB '16 - U.S. Representative for Florida's 18th congressional district
- Chris Wakim - former member of the West Virginia House of Delegates
- Gerald Oriol Jr., ALM - Haiti’s Secretary of State for the Integration of Persons with Disabilities
- Maliz E. Beams, CSS - Counselor of the United States Department of State
- Jamus Lim, ALM ‘18 - Member of the Singapore Parliament

== Non-profits ==
- Mark Plotkin, ALB ’79 - ethnobotanist; President, Amazon Conservation Team
- Evan R. Bernstein, ALM ‘11 - Community Activist/CEO and National Director of The Community Security Service

== Journalism ==
- Chanel Rion, ALB '15 - White House correspondent for One America News Network
- Mikaya Thurmond, ALM '18 - North Carolina television journalist

== Law ==
- Sarah Buel, ALB '87 - attorney

== Writers ==
- A. Breeze Harper, ALM '07 - author of books and studies on veganism and racism
- Harold L. Humes, Adjunct in Arts

== Others ==
- Meryl Davis, ALM '25 - Olympic champion
- Russ Hogue, ALM ’21 - Professional boxer, kickboxer; US Kickboxing Champion
- Logan Kilpatrick, ALB '21, ALM '23 - Software engineer
