= Sports in St. Louis =

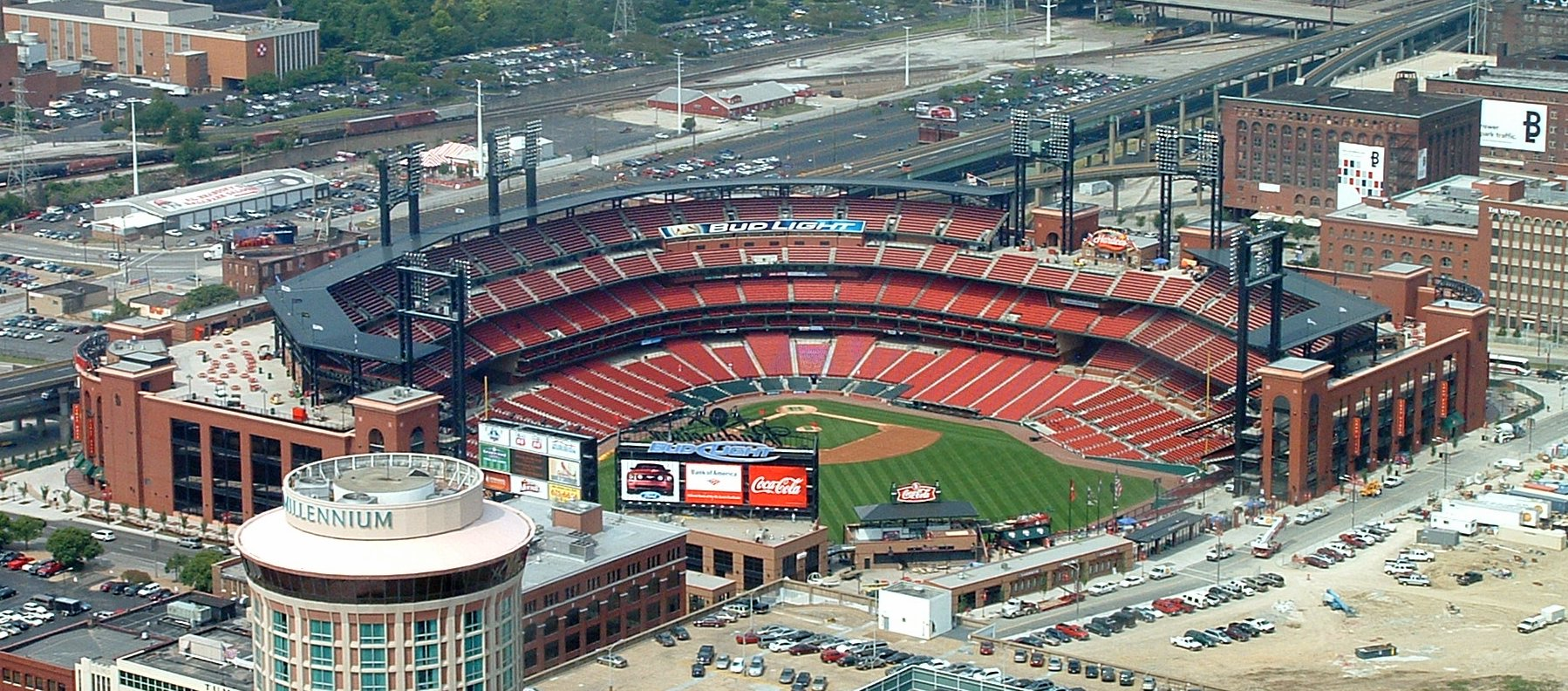
A view of Busch Stadium from the top of the Gateway Arch

The city of St. Louis, Missouri, in the United States is home to more than a dozen professional, semi-professional, and collegiate sports teams. When the St. Louis Rams were in the city, Sporting News rated St. Louis the nation's "Best Sports City" in 2000 and The Wall Street Journal named it the best sports city in 2015.

St. Louis has three major league sports teams. The St. Louis Cardinals, one of the oldest franchises in Major League Baseball (MLB), have won 11 World Series, second only to the New York Yankees' 27. One of their titles was played against the old cross-city rival St. Louis Browns in 1944. The St. Louis Blues of the National Hockey League (NHL) won the 2019 Stanley Cup, appeared in three championship finals from 1968 to 1970, and made 25 consecutive playoff appearances from 1979–80 to 2003–04. St. Louis City SC of Major League Soccer started play in 2023, and the St. Louis Battlehawks of the XFL, which had started play in that league's COVID-abbreviated 2020 season, resumed play along with the league in 2023.

The most recent team to begin play in St. Louis is St. Louis City SC, a Major League Soccer expansion team that started play in 2023. St. Louis has an extensive history in soccer, contributing at least one participant to each FIFA World Cup contested by the United States men's team. The city is the birthplace of corkball.

St. Louis hosted the 1904 Summer Olympics.

== Current teams ==
=== Major league teams ===
Team	Sport	League	Established	Venue	Championships
St. Louis Blues	Ice hockey	National Hockey League	1967	Enterprise Center	1
St. Louis Cardinals	Baseball	Major League Baseball	1882	Busch Stadium	11
St. Louis City SC	Soccer	Major League Soccer	2019	Energizer Park	0

=== Other professional leagues and minor leagues (including Greater St. Louis area) ===
Team	Sport	League	Established	Location	Venue	Champs
St. Louis BattleHawks	Football	United Football League	2018	St. Louis, Missouri	The Dome at America's Center	0
St. Louis Ambush	Indoor soccer	Major Arena Soccer League	2013	St. Charles, Missouri	Family Arena	0
Gateway Grizzlies	Baseball	Frontier League	2001	Sauget, Illinois	GCS Ballpark	1
St. Louis City 2	Soccer	MLS Next Pro	2021	St. Louis, Missouri	Energizer Park	0
St. Louis Jr. Blues	Ice hockey	North American 3 Hockey League	1978	St. Louis, Missouri	Affton Ice Rink	5

== Baseball ==
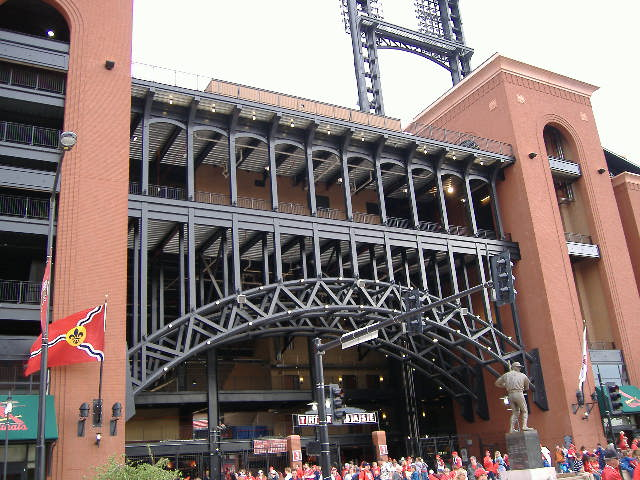
The St. Louis Cardinals' Busch Stadium during its first season in 2006.

See footnote

St. Louis is represented in Major League Baseball by the Cardinals, founded in 1882 and playing in the National League since 1892. The team won its first World Series in 1926 and its 11th and most recent in 2011. The team plays at the 43,795-seat Busch Stadium (the third ground to bear that name), which has a view of the city's Gateway Arch.

The 2009 Major League Baseball All-Star Game between the American League (AL) and the National League (NL) was held on July 14, 2009, at Busch Stadium. It was the first All-Star Game held in St. Louis since 1966.

The St. Louis Browns played in the AL from 1902 to 1953.

The St. Louis Giants were a Negro league baseball team from 1906 to 1921. In 1922, the Giants were renamed the St. Louis Stars and went on to win championships in 1928, 1930, and the club's final season, 1931. National Baseball Hall of Fame inductees James “Cool Papa” Bell, Willie “The Devil” Wells, and George “Mule” Suttles wore the St. Louis Stars uniform.

== Soccer ==
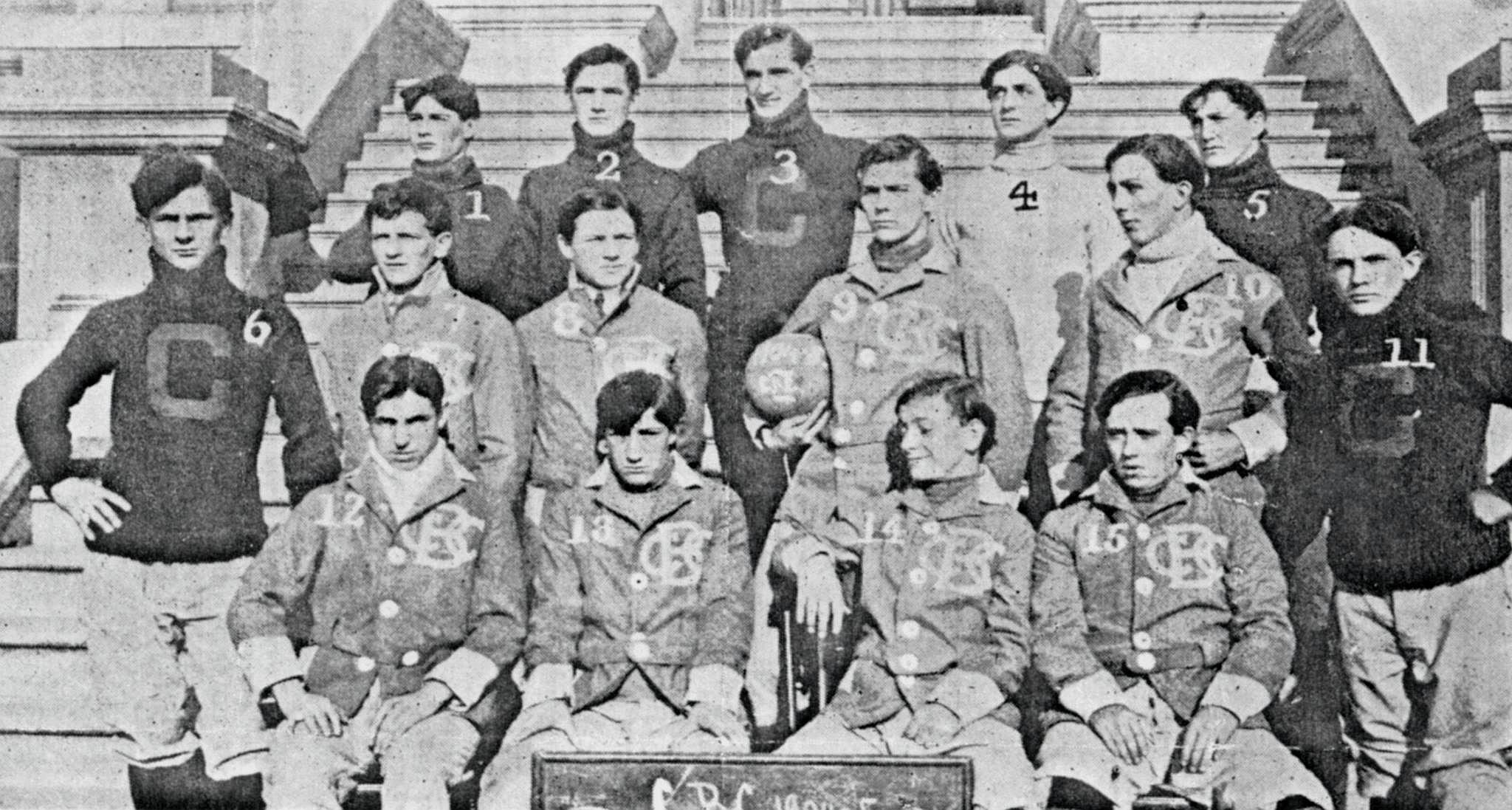
St. Louis team Christian Brothers College won the silver medal at the 1904 Summer Olympics

On August 20, 2019, Major League Soccer announced it had approved St. Louis as the league's 28th franchise. The franchise, St. Louis City SC, was initially expected to join in the 2022 season, but its debut was put off to 2023. It plays home games at Energizer Park, located next to Union Station, which opened in 2023. The stadium will host eight soccer matches during the 2028 Summer Olympics.

City SC's reserve side, St. Louis City 2, began play in 2022 as one of the 21 inaugural members of MLS Next Pro, a third-level league consisting almost entirely of reserve sides of MLS clubs. In its first season, City2 split its home schedule between Hermann Stadium at Saint Louis University and Ralph Korte Stadium at Southern Illinois University Edwardsville, but all home games were moved to Energizer Arena (then CityPark) in 2023.

St. Louis is represented in the IPL by the St. Louis Ambush and in the USL by Saint Louis FC., who played their games at World Wide Technology Soccer Park in Fenton.

The Saint Louis University men's soccer team has won 10 national championships, appeared in 16 NCAA Final Fours.

In 2013, Chelsea and Manchester City played to a sellout crowd of 48,000 at Busch Stadium. On August 10 of that year, the Edward Jones Dome hosted a friendly match between Real Madrid and Inter Milan, drawing 54,184 fans and setting a St. Louis attendance record for a soccer match.

Five St. Louisans, including many from the historically Italian neighborhood of The Hill, played on the U.S. team for the 1950 World Cup, which defeated England 1-0 in one of the most noted upsets in World Cup history. This event was chronicled in the 2005 film The Game of Their Lives (released on DVD as The Miracle Match). Several recent American soccer players are from St. Louis, including Brad Davis, Chris Klein, Pat Noonan, Matt Pickens, Steve Ralston, Mike Sorber, Tim Ream, and Taylor Twellman. Additionally, former Bosnia and Herzegovina player Vedad Ibišević attended high school in the city and played a season for SLU.

St. Louis is the former home of several professional teams, including the St. Louis Stars, which played in St. Louis from 1967 to 1977 in the North American Soccer League. St. Louis also was the home of the St. Louis Steamers, an indoor soccer team that played in St. Louis from 1979 to 1988. The Steamers averaged over 17,000 fans during their peak, outdrawing the St. Louis Blues NHL team. The St. Louis Ambush stole the scene from 1992 to 2000. Featuring mainly local talent, the team won the 1995 NPSL championship, which was and still is the only professional soccer championship in the history of St. Louis.

The Saint Louis Athletica competed in Women's Professional Soccer from 2009 to 2010. Athletica played its home matches on the campus of Southern Illinois University Edwardsville and later moved to Scott Gallagher Soccer Park in west county. The team folded in May 2010 when donors did not continue to fund the team.

Club Atletico Saint Louis, a semi-professional soccer team, began play in 2018 after being founded as a youth clinic two years prior. The team competes within the National Premier Soccer League and plays out of St. Louis University High School Soccer Stadium.

The St. Louis Soccer Hall of Fame, established in 1971, is located at the Midwest Soccer Academy and includes a museum with various exhibits. The first annual dinner was held in 1971. 27 members of the St. Louis Soccer Hall of Fame have been inducted into the National Soccer Hall of Fame.

== Ice hockey ==
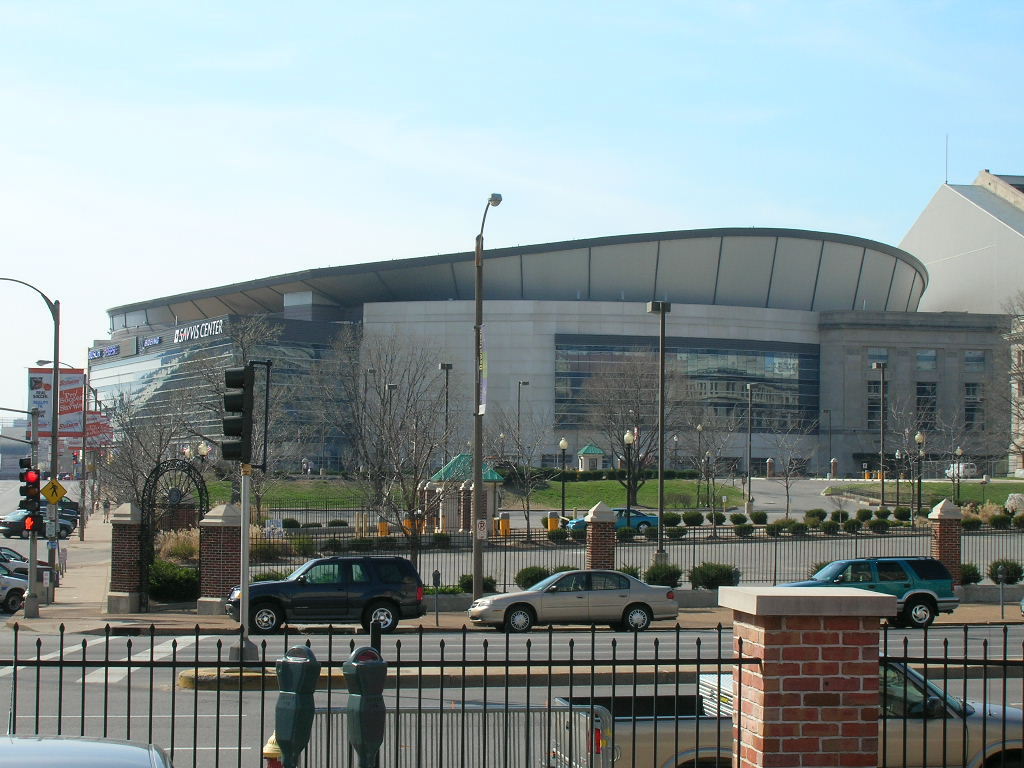
Enterprise Center

The St. Louis Blues are a professional ice hockey team in St. Louis. They are members of the Central Division of the Western Conference of the NHL. The team is named after the famous W. C. Handy song "Saint Louis Blues", and plays in the 19,150-seat Enterprise Center in downtown St. Louis. The franchise was founded in 1967 as one of the expansion teams during the league's original expansion from six to twelve teams. The team won the Stanley Cup in 2019.

The first NHL team to call St. Louis its home was the St. Louis Eagles. The franchise moved from Ottawa in time for the 1934–35 NHL season. The Ottawa Senators had played in the NHL from 1917 to 1934. During that time the team had won the Stanley Cup in 1903, 1904, 1905, 1906, 1909, 1910, 1911, 1920, 1921, 1923, and 1927. Following the Cup win in 1927 the team went on a sharp decline and in December 1933 rumors surfaced that the Senators would merge with the equally strapped New York Americans. This information was denied by Ottawa club president Frank Ahearn, who had sought financial help from the league. The team played the full 1933–34 season, transferring one home game to Detroit. Near the end of the season, reports surfaced that the club had entered into a deal with St. Louis "interests" to move the club. The team lost its last home game by a score of 3–2 to the Americans on March 15, 1934, before a crowd of 6,500. The final game of the season was a 2–2 tie with the Maroons at the Montreal Forum on March 18, 1934.

The Eagles would survive only one season, as the team continued to lose money due to high travel costs. At that time, the league only had nine teams, with St. Louis playing in the Canadian Division. The division consisted of two teams in Montreal (the Canadiens and Maroons), one team in Toronto (Toronto) and the New York Americans. The American Division hosted the Boston Bruins, Detroit Red Wings, Chicago Black Hawks and the New York Rangers. The Eagles would finish with a league-worse record of 11-31-6.

== American football ==
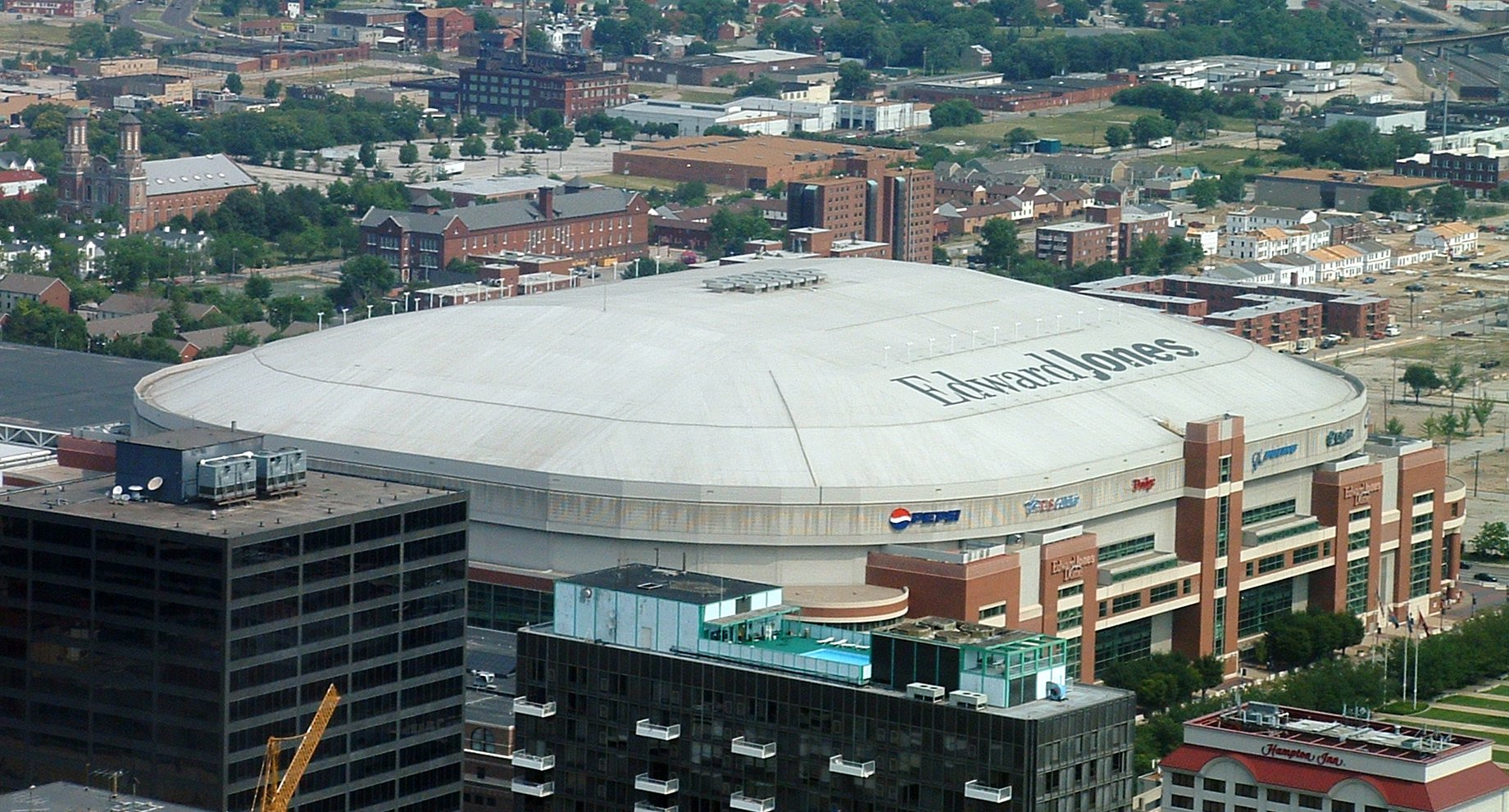
The Edward Jones Dome (now known as The Dome at America's Center), former home of the NFL St. Louis Rams from 1995 until 2015 and current home of the UFL St. Louis BattleHawks since 2020.

St. Louis has been the home of four National Football League (NFL) franchises. Three years after the NFL was founded in 1920, it accepted the St. Louis All-Stars as a franchise for the 1923 NFL season. The team finished 1–4–2 in league play, and a 2–5–2 overall record while finishing fourteenth in the standings. The team's first NFL game was on October 7, 1923, and it ended in a 0–0 tie as they played on the road against the Green Bay Packers. A week later they played to another 0–0 tie in their first home game, against the Hammond Pros, a traveling team from Hammond, Indiana. St. Louis played at Sportsman's Park, a facility that also hosted both of the professional baseball teams in the city: the Cardinals and the Browns. Their sole victory came on November 11, 1923, when they defeated the Oorang Indians (from LaRue, Ohio), 14–7.

The second franchise was the St. Louis Gunners. The Gunners were an independent professional football team that played the last three games of the 1934 National Football League season, replacing the Cincinnati Reds on the league schedule after the Reds' league membership was suspended. They won their first game against the Pittsburgh Pirates (now Steelers) 6–0, but lost the last two to the Detroit Lions (40–7) and the Green Bay Packers (21–14). Six of the Reds players joined the team for the last two games. The team was headquartered at the St. Louis National Guard Armory, which accounts for its nickname the 'Gunners'.

The third franchise was the St. Louis Cardinals and they played in St. Louis from 1960 to 1987. They advanced to the playoffs just three times (1974, 1975 & 1982), never hosting or winning in any appearance. In 1987, the team moved to Phoenix, Arizona and became the Phoenix Cardinals; the team changed its geographic location name to Arizona in 1994. Before moving to St. Louis, the Cardinals were based in Chicago. The Chicago Cardinals played there from their founding in 1898 until their move to Missouri in 1959.

The fourth franchise was the St. Louis Rams who played in the city from 1995 to 2015. Founded in 1936 in Cleveland, Ohio, the Rams won the pre-merger NFL Championship twice, in 1945 and 1951. After playing in Los Angeles from 1946 to 1994, the Rams moved to St. Louis in 1995. The team appeared in 2 Super Bowls while based in St. Louis, defeating the Tennessee Titans 23–16 to win Super Bowl XXXIV in 2000, and losing 20–17 to the New England Patriots in Super Bowl XXXVI in 2002. The team's home in St. Louis, the Edward Jones Dome, hosted 66,965 spectators.

On January 13, 2016, it was announced that NFL owners voted 30–2 to allow Rams ownership to move the team back to Los Angeles for the 2016 season.

In December 2018, it was announced the XFL would place a team in St. Louis. The St. Louis BattleHawks began play in February 2020 and played their home games at the Dome. The XFL season was ended prematurely by the COVID-19 pandemic, and the league soon folded and filed for bankruptcy. After a group led by Dwayne Johnson bought the league out of bankruptcy, the league resumed play in 2023, with the BattleHawks returning.

Saint Louis University football coach Eddie Cochems developed the first modern passing offense in American football history in 1906. Cochems' star halfback, Bradbury Robinson, threw the first legal forward pass on September 5, 1906, in a 22–0 victory over Carroll College at Waukesha, Wisconsin.

== Basketball ==
St. Louis was home to two National Basketball Association (NBA) teams, the St. Louis Bombers (1949–50) and the St. Louis Hawks (1955–1968), who won the NBA Title in 1958, and also to the American Basketball Association (ABA)'s Spirits of St. Louis (1974–76), before the ABA–NBA merger. From 2011 until the league's folding in 2024, St. Louis supported the St. Louis Surge, a women's professional basketball team owned by Khalia Collier, which played in the Women's Blue-Chip Basketball League (WBCBL) through 2018 before moving to the Global Women's Basketball Association (GWBA) for the 2019 season. The Surge won two national championships and five regional.

== Corkball ==
St. Louis has several recreational corkball leagues. A variant of baseball, corkball is played with a 1.6-oz. ball and a bat whose barrel is 1.5" wide. It has many of the features of baseball, yet can be played in a very small area because there is no base-running. Invented on the streets and alleys of St. Louis in the early 1900s, the game has leagues around the country, thanks to servicemen who introduced the game to their buddies during World War II and the Korean War.

== Individual sports ==
St. Louis was home to four prominent twentieth-century boxers: Sonny Liston, Henry Armstrong, and brothers Leon and Michael Spinks. The Spinkses are the first of only two sets of brothers to have captured the heavyweight boxing title. Leon's son Cory Spinks has also held a world title.

The Gateway Cross Cup is an international professional competition in cyclo-cross, a combination of mountain bike racing and road bicycle racing.

World Wide Technology Raceway at Gateway hosts NHRA Drag Racing, IndyCar Series, and NASCAR racing events 5 miles (8 km) east of the city in Madison, Illinois.

== College sports ==
Saint Louis University (SLU) plays NCAA Division I sports as a member of the Atlantic 10 Conference. SLU dropped football as an intercollegiate sport in 1949, but SLU is best known for its men's basketball and men's soccer programs. SLU men's soccer led the NCAA in average attendance in 1999, 2001, and 2003, drawing over 2,700 fans per match each season. In 2006, the College Cup was played at Hermann Stadium on the SLU campus.

The Metro East region, across the Mississippi River in Illinois, is home to Southern Illinois University Edwardsville (SIUE), whose teams play as the SIU Edwardsville Cougars in the Division I Ohio Valley Conference (OVC). Like SLU, SIUE does not sponsor football, but unlike SLU has never had a football program. SIUE is also known for its men's soccer program, and has an active rivalry with the Billikens. The men's soccer team joined the OVC, which previously sponsored soccer only for women, in 2023 when that conference launched a men's soccer league for the first time.

Lindenwood University, located in the suburb of St. Charles, is represented by the Lindenwood Lions. Since the start of the school's transition from Division II to Division I in July 2022, most Lions teams have competed in the OVC. The football team plays in the Big South–OVC Football Association, a football-only alliance between the OVC and the Big South Conference that started play in 2023. Even before the Lions' move to Division I, three Lindenwood programs in sports not sponsored by the OVC competed as effective Division I members in sports that have no Division II national championship, with two still active. The women's ice hockey team competed in College Hockey America before the conference's 2024 merger with the Atlantic Hockey Association that created Atlantic Hockey America. The women's gymnastics team competed in the Midwest Independent Conference until the team was shut down after the 2023–24 season (see below), and the men's volleyball team plays in the Midwestern Intercollegiate Volleyball Association. Five other Lindenwood teams that had competed in the school's former D-II home of the Great Lakes Valley Conference joined other D-I conferences in 2022, all in sports not sponsored by the OVC. Men's and women's lacrosse joined the Atlantic Sun Conference (with men's lacrosse being dropped after the 2023–24 season), while men's soccer and men's and women's swimming & diving joined the Summit League. Men's ice hockey, which was added as a varsity sport in 2022–23, competes as a Division I independent. Men's soccer moved to the OVC when that conference began sponsoring the sport in 2023–24, while both swimming & diving programs were eliminated after that school year. Lindenwood's rugby program, despite having started only in 2011, is one of the top ranked rugby programs in the country.

On December 1, 2023, Lindenwood announced it would eliminate nine NCAA teams and 10 in all at the end of the 2023–24 school year — the coeducational club sport of cycling, women's field hockey, women's gymnastics, men's lacrosse, men's and women's swimming & diving, men's tennis, men's indoor and outdoor track & field, and men's wrestling.

Lindenwood also operated a sister campus on the Illinois side of the river in Belleville from 2009 until that campus was closed in 2020. The Belleville campus had been a dual member of the NAIA and USCAA in its first season of varsity athletics in 2011–12, and then fully aligned with the NAIA, remaining in that organization until the campus' closure.

The University of Missouri–St. Louis, located just outside the city limits in St. Louis County, also has an NCAA Division II athletic program in the UMSL Tritons. All of the school's teams compete in the Great Lakes Valley Conference.

In NCAA Division III, the Washington University Bears, representing Washington University in St. Louis, have won 18 national titles in four different sports.

In March 2005, The Dome at America's Center, then known as Edward Jones Dome, in St. Louis hosted the final two rounds of the NCAA Men's Division I Basketball Championship, also known as the Final Four. In April 2009, the Edward Jones Dome hosted the NCAA Women's Division I Basketball Championship Final Four. The Enterprise Center also hosts the annual "Braggin' Rights" game, a men's college basketball rivalry game between the universities of Illinois and Missouri. St. Louis is roughly equidistant from the two campuses.

The Enterprise Center, then known as Scottrade Center, hosted the 2007 Frozen Four as well as the 2025 Frozen Four.

Since 2000, the Enterprise Center has hosted the NCAA Division I Wrestling Championships nine times, most recently in 2021.

== Former teams ==
Team	Sport	League	Established	Began in St. Louis	Venue	Titles in St. Louis	Left St. Louis
River City Rascals	Baseball	Frontier League	1993	1999	CarShield Field	2	2019
St. Louis Browns	Baseball	American League	1894	1902	Sportsman's Park	0	1954
St. Louis Giants	Baseball	Negro National League (1920–1931)	1906	1906	Giants Park	0	1921
St. Louis Maroons	Baseball	Union Association National League	1884	1884	Union Base Ball Park	1	1886
St. Louis Stars	Baseball	Negro National League	1922	1931	Stars Park	3	1931
St. Louis Stars	Baseball	Negro American League	1937	1939	Stars Park	0	1939
St. Louis Terriers	Baseball	Federal League	1914	1914	Handlan's Park	0	1915
Spirits of St. Louis	Basketball	American Basketball Association	1967	1974	St. Louis Arena	0	1976
St. Louis Bombers	Basketball	Basketball Association of America; National Basketball Association	1946; 1949	1949; 1950	St. Louis Arena	0	1950
St. Louis Hawks	Basketball	National Basketball Association	1946	1955	Kiel Auditorium	1	1968
St. Louis Swarm	Basketball	International Basketball League	1999	2001	Family Arena	2	2001
St. Louis Stampede	Arena football	Arena Football League	1995	1995	Kiel Center	0	1996
St. Louis Renegades RiverCity Rage Show-Me Believers	Arena Football	Indoor Professional Football League National Indoor Football League United Indoor Football Indoor Football League	2001	2001	Family Arena / Scottrade Center	0	2009
Missouri Monsters St. Louis Attack River City Raiders	Arena Football	Ultimate Indoor Football League X-League Indoor Football American Indoor Football Arena Pro Football	2013	2013	Family Arena	0	2017
St. Louis All Stars	Football	National Football League	1923	1923	Sportsman's Park	0	1923
St. Louis Cardinals	Football	National Football League	1898	1960	Busch Stadium I (1960–1965); Busch Stadium II (1966–1987)	0	1988
St. Louis Gunners	Football	National Football League	1931	1931	Sportsman's Park	0	1934
St. Louis Rams	Football	National Football League	1936	1995	Edward Jones Dome	1	2016
St. Louis Saints	Women's Football	Lingerie Football League	2008	2012	Family Arena	0	2012
Missouri River Otters	Ice Hockey	United Hockey League	1991	1999	Family Arena	0	2006
St. Charles Chill	Ice Hockey	Central Hockey League	2013	2013	Family Arena	0	2014
St. Louis Bandits	Ice Hockey	North American Hockey League	2003	2006	Hardee's IcePlex	3	2012
St. Louis Braves	Ice Hockey	Central Professional Hockey League	1963	1963	St. Louis Arena	0	1967
St. Louis Eagles	Ice Hockey	National Hockey League	1934	1934	St. Louis Arena	0	1936
St. Louis Flyers	Ice Hockey	American Hockey Association; American Hockey League	1928; 1944	1942; 1953	St. Louis Arena	5	1953
St. Louis Heartland Eagles	Ice Hockey	United States Hockey League	2001	2003	Hardee's IcePlex	0	2004
St. Louis Vipers	Roller Hockey	Roller Hockey International	1993	1993	St. Louis Arena/Kiel Center	1	1999
St. Louis Ambush	Indoor Soccer	National Professional Soccer League	1984	1992	St. Louis Arena/Kiel Center	1	2000
St. Louis Steamers/ St. Louis Storm	Indoor Soccer	Major Indoor Soccer League	1977	1979	St. Louis Arena	0	1992
St. Louis Steamers	Indoor Soccer	World Indoor Soccer League; Major Indoor Soccer League	1997	2000	Family Arena/Scottrade Center	0	2006
AC St. Louis	Soccer	USSF Division 2 Professional League	2008	2009	Anheuser-Busch Center	0	2011
Saint Louis Athletica	Soccer	Women's Professional Soccer	2007	2009	Soccer Park	0	2010
Saint Louis FC	Soccer	USL Championship	2014	2020	World Wide Technology Soccer Park	0	2020
St. Louis Stars	Soccer	National Professional Soccer League; North American Soccer League	1967	1967	Busch Memorial Stadium/Francis Field	0	1978
Saint Louis Hummers	Softball	International Women's Professional Softball Association	1976	1977	Harrawood Sports Complex	0	1979
St. Louis Aces	Tennis	World TeamTennis	1994	1994	Dwight Davis Tennis Center in Forest Park	1	2011
St. Louis Slims	Tennis	World TeamTennis	1985	1985	St. Louis Arena	0	1985
