= Robelyn Garcia =

American basketball player

Personal information
- Born: September 16, 1965 (age 61) Phoenix, Arizona
- Listed height: 5 ft 9 in (1.75 m)

Career information
- High school: Wichita East High School; Enid High School; Elkhart, Kansas High School
- College: University of Nebraska–Lincoln; Dodge City Community College; Friends University
- Playing career: 1990–1996
- Position: Shooting Guard

Career history
- 1990-91: LBA, Guadalupe, British Columbia
- 1992: WBA All-Star Exhibition Team
- 1993: Kansas Crusaders
- 1994-95: Kansas City Mustangs
- 1996: Tulsa Flames

Career highlights
- WNBA awards: 4X WBA All-Star (1992, 1993, 1994, 1995); WBA Big Six Champion (1993); WBA Championship Game MVP (1993); Career awards: WBCBL Professional Basketball Trailblazer Award (2015); DCCC Athletic Hall of Fame (2015); WBA Gold-Star Vision Award (2017); Black Archives of Mid-America Women's Pro Basketball Association Hall of Fame (2020); WBA 3-Point Shooter Award (2022)
Medals
Senior Olympics Gold Medal (2015, 2017, 2018, 2019)
World Senior Games Gold Medal (2017)

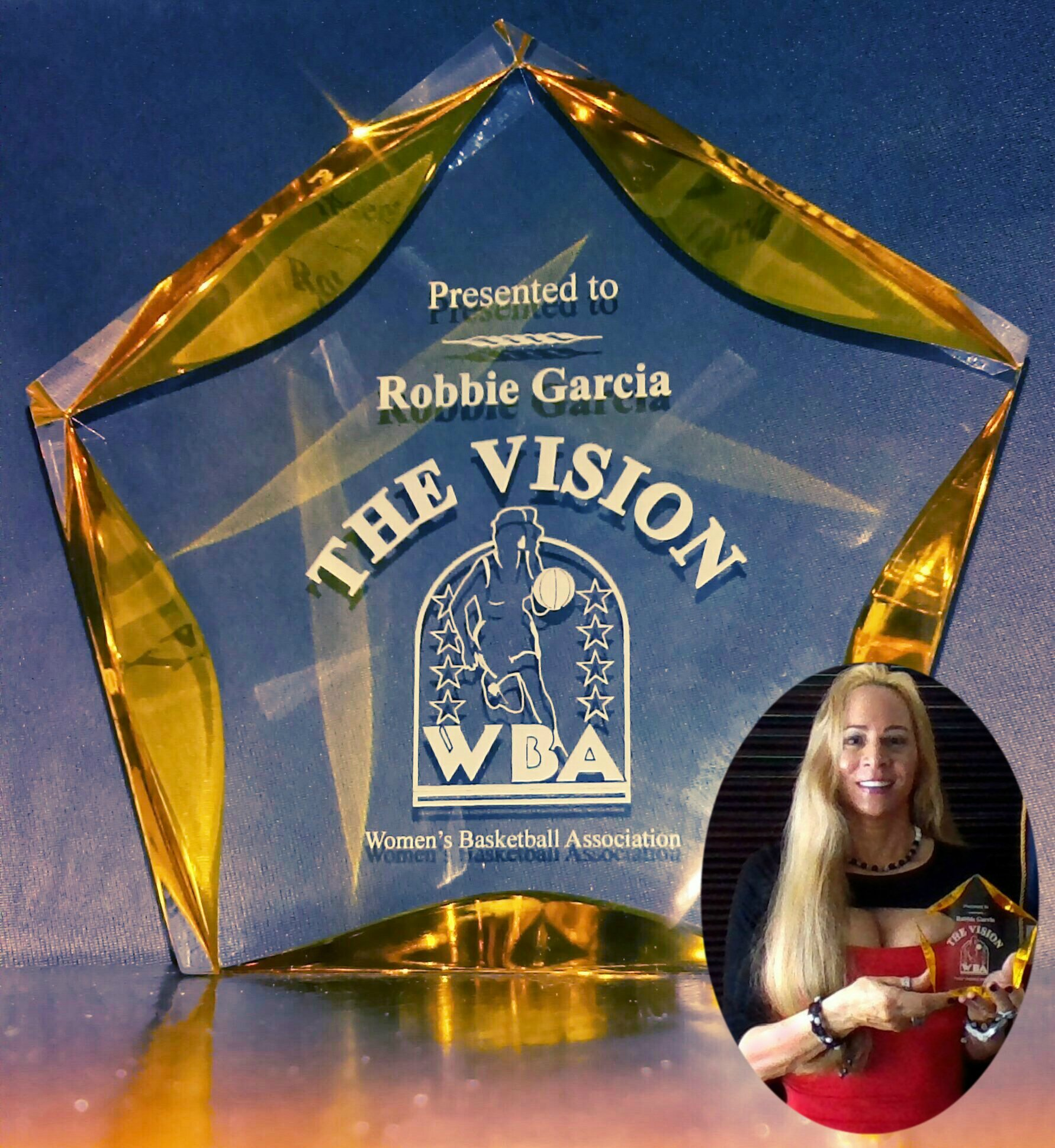
Garcia with her WBA 2017 Gold-Star Vision Award

Robelyn Annette Garcia (born September 16, 1965) is a former collegiate All-American and professional All-Star basketball player. She was the Big Six Championship Game MVP on the Kansas Crusaders of the Women's Basketball Association (WBA). Garcia was inducted into the Black Archives of Mid-America WBA Hall of Fame on February 22, 2020. Robelyn, nicknamed "Robbie" by her junior college coach, also led the nation in scoring while playing at Dodge City Community College where she was inducted into the Athletic Hall of Fame.

== High school ==
Garcia played at five different high schools; she had a high scoring game of 56 points while playing six-on-six basketball in Oklahoma. She also played two years for Wichita East High School and was an all-state player at Elkhart High School in Elkhart, Kansas, where she led her team in scoring. Garcia played on two All-Star teams her senior year including the Kansas vs Texas All-Star Challenge. In addition, she was the leading scorer in the Boot Hill High School All-State game in 1983. Garcia also played softball, soccer, volleyball, ran cross country and track and field in high school.

== College career ==
Garcia's collegiate career began with high-scoring games of 46 and 40 points in her first year as a college player. She was a Region NJCAA All-American and led the nation in scoring as a freshman, averaging 31.5 points per game before the implementation of the three-point line in the college game. Many of her points came from beyond what would have been the three-point arc. She is the career all-time leading scorer at Dodge City College after scoring 1,298 points in just two years and has held this title since 1985. "At Dodge City, Garcia earned All-America honors and was ranked as one of the top junior college swing guards in the country when she averaged 28 points and five rebounds per game as a sophomore in 1984–85. She ranked as the nation's fourth-leading scorer as a sophomore." Garcia played at the University of Nebraska her junior year and Friends University her senior year where she averaged 20 points per game and led her team and league in assists. She was a unanimous KCAC First-Team selection and NAIA Region All-Star her senior year. Friends University Lady Falcons won the KCAC conference and made the NAIA National Tournament. Her Friends University Hall of Fame Coach Jim Littell, former head coach at Oklahoma State University and current assistant at Wichita State University, said "She's the greatest offensive talent I have ever coached. Passing, scoring, handling the ball."

Garcia was a multi-sport athlete in college; she also played softball, soccer, ran cross country and track. She was honored in May 2015 with her induction into the Dodge City College Athletic Hall of Fame.

== Professional career ==
Robelyn Garcia on Kansas WBA Championship Team

Garcia played on several professional basketball teams and leagues, including the 1993 Champion Kansas Crusaders, Kansas City Mustangs and Tulsa Flames of the WBA. She also played in The Pro-Am, AAU Women's League, Guadalupe, Mexico, British Columbia, and was chosen to play in the Liberty Basketball Association (LBA) professional league. Garcia's Kansas Crusaders team won the first WBA Championship in 1993. Her Kansas City Mustangs team won the regular WBA season going undefeated 15–0 in 1994. Garcia was a 4-time WBA All-Star and is featured on the collector WBA All-Star Card Set by Fair Play Sports. She is quoted several times and highlighted with five photos and a three-page spread in the 2017 best-selling book and documentary film The Vision: The Untold Story of the Women's Basketball Association by Lightning Ned Mitchell. In addition, Garcia was awarded the oldest women's sports award of Women's Basketball AAU Athlete of the year in 1992 while playing on her Championship Kansas City Keys AAU Team.

Garcia also received the 2015 WBCBL Women's Professional Basketball "Trailblazer" Award on August 2, 2015. The award recognizes some of the most influential people in professional women's basketball, specifically those who helped blaze the trail, shape the overall landscape and pave the way for women's professional basketball.

Garcia, her Kansas City Mustangs undefeated team, the Kansas Crusaders Championship team and the entire Women's Basketball Association have a permanent display at The Black Archives of Mid-America Women's Pro Basketball Hall of Fame.

== Coaching career ==
Owner/Player/Coach for Christian Basketball Team Garcia

Garcia coached two seasons at Haskell Indian Nations University in Lawrence, Kansas, while she was working on her doctorate at the University of Kansas. She coached the Fighting Indians freshman team to an undefeated 20–0 season in 1992. Garcia also coached several semi-pro, exhibition and club teams including the touring team Christian Basketball.

== Higher education ==
Garcia, a lifelong scholar, has earned the following academic degrees and diplomas:

- Associate of Arts, Dodge City Community College (1985)
- Bachelor of Liberal Arts and General Studies, Wichita State University (1990)
- Master of Science, Central Missouri State University (1992)
- Master of Education, LaSalle University (1993)
- Doctor of Philosophy (PhD) in education administration, LaSalle University (1994)
- Post-Doc Graduate Certificate, Gerontology, Arizona State University (2009)
- Master of Science, Aging and Lifespan Development, Arizona State University (2011)
- Master of Arts, Criminal Justice and Criminology, Arizona State University (2014)
- Bachelor of Metaphysical Science, University of Metaphysics (2018)
- Graduate Certificate, Law Enforcement Administration, Arizona State University (2019)
- Professional Graduate Certificate, Web Technologies, Harvard University Extension School (2020)
- Master of Metaphysical Science, University of Metaphysics (2023)
- Graduate Certificate, Public Health (GCPH), Walden University (2025)

Lastly, Garcia is currently working on the following degrees:

- Master's degree in digital media and museum technology at Harvard University
- Doctor of Education (EdD), Walden University
- Doctorate degree in Metaphysical Science, at The University of Sedona, to add metaphysician to her list of titles

At Arizona State, she was inducted into the Arizona State Chapter of Phi Kappa Phi for her academic and scholarly achievement in May 2014. She is also a post-doc in the Doctor of Behavioral Health program.

In 2018 Garcia became an Arizona State University faculty affiliate in the Biomimicry department. In addition to her post-secondary degrees, research and teaching, she has several publications, including her Guide to Coaching Youth Basketball.

== Other activities ==
Garcia began competition in 2014 for the Senior Olympics, 2015 regional Senior Games and the 2016 World Games. She won her first gold medal in the Senior Games in 2015 and won gold medals in the 2017, 2018 and 2019 Senior Olympics. Robelyn also won a gold medal at the World Senior Games in October 2017. Garcia is the president emeritus of the Jr. NBA-WNBA and the Vice President of American Community Team Sports. She has been a professor in various academic fields for over twenty years. Dr. Garcia began offering Jr. NBA - WNBA scholarships in 2011 in honor of her late Mother and launched her new Dr. Robelyn Garcia Scholarships in 2015. She is the official team sponsor for the new Kansas City Pro WBCBL team and also provides scholarships for Seniors 50+, Jr. NBA-WNBA Players, WBCBL Teams and College Scholar Athletes. Her volunteer work includes work with the City of Scottsdale, Arizona, Bicycle Charities, The Arizona State University Doctor of Behavioral Health Student Forum, Special Olympics, Harvard University DCE Accessibility Services, Beatitudes Healthy Aging Adult Center and Senior University. Garcia was also a radio announcer for the WBA, DCCC, University of Nebraska, Friends University and Kansas City Public radio. Dr. Garcia was featured in and authored the afterword for the 2015 book "It's Your Go Season" by Kandi Conda. She released a Kindle book titled "Consumer Health Awareness: A Guide to Intelligent Decisions for Selecting Integrative Holistic Medicine" in 2018.

== See also ==
- Women's Basketball Association
- Notable Harvard Extension School Alumni
- Dodge City Conquistadors Hall of Fame
