= Boston Bulldogs =

The Boston Bulldogs can refer to the following sports teams:

- Boston Bulldogs (AFL), a professional American football team that was a member of the first American Football League in 1926
- Boston Bulldogs (NFL), a professional American football team that was originally the Pottsville Maroons, playing in Boston in 1929
- Boston Bulldogs (soccer), a professional football (soccer) team that started as the Worcester Wildfire in 1997 and competed in the A-League and the USL Pro Soccer League
- Boston Bulldogs (ice hockey), a former American Tier III Junior A ice hockey team that competed in the Atlantic Junior Hockey League
- Boston Bulldogs (WBCBL), a professional women's basketball team and member of the Women's Blue Chip Basketball League whose name was changed from Boston Bombers after the Boston Marathon bombing
