= Joe C. Meriweather =

American basketball player

Personal information
- Born: October 26, 1953 Phenix City, Alabama, U.S.
- Died: October 13, 2013 (aged 59) Columbus, Georgia, U.S.
- Listed height: 6 ft 10 in (2.08 m)
- Listed weight: 215 lb (98 kg)

Career information
- High school: Central (Phenix City, Alabama)
- College: Southern Illinois (1972–1975)
- NBA draft: 1975: 1st round, 11th overall pick
- Drafted by: Houston Rockets
- Playing career: 1975–1988
- Position: Center / power forward
- Number: 50, 25, 31

Career history
- 1975–1976: Houston Rockets
- 1976–1977: Atlanta Hawks
- 1977–1979: New Orleans Jazz
- 1979–1980: New York Knicks
- 1980–1985: Kansas City Kings
- 1985–1986: Granarolo Bologna
- 1987–1988: Joventut Badalona

Career highlights
- NBA All-Rookie First Team (1976)

Career NBA statistics
- Points: 5,439 (8.1 ppg)
- Rebounds: 3,764 (5.6 rpg)
- Blocks: 810 (1.2 bpg)
- Stats at NBA.com
- Stats at Basketball Reference
Medals
Representing United States
Men's basketball
FIBA World Championship
Bronze medal – third place	1974 Puerto Rico	Team competition

Joe C. Meriweather (October 26, 1953 – October 13, 2013) was an American professional basketball player.

A 6'10" center from Southern Illinois University, Meriweather played ten seasons (1975–1985) in the National Basketball Association (NBA) as a member of the Houston Rockets, Atlanta Hawks, New Orleans Jazz, New York Knicks, and Kansas City Kings. He earned NBA All-Rookie honors in his first season, during which he averaged 10.2 points, 6.4 rebounds, and 1.5 blocks. Over the course of his NBA career, Meriweather averaged 8.1 points, 5.6 rebounds, and 1.2 blocks.

Of note, Meriweather is one of a select few players who have blocked 10 shots in an NBA game more than once. Meriweather accomplished the feat twice during his career, first with the Jazz in 1977 (his only career triple double), and then again later with the Knicks in 1979. Those totals established franchise records for both teams; the Jazz record has since been broken by Mark Eaton numerous times, but Meriweather still holds the record for the Knicks (later tied by Dikembe Mutombo).

He played for the US national team in the 1974 FIBA World Championship, winning the bronze medal.

Meriweather spent the 1985–86 basketball season playing for Granarolo Bologna in Italy. He coached the Kansas City Mustangs of the Women's Basketball Association professional league to an undefeated season in 1994. He also served as the head women's basketball coach at Park University in Parkville, Missouri, from 1997 to 2010 before resigning in March 2010.

Meriweather died on October 13, 2013, in Columbus, Georgia.

== Career statistics ==
Legend
GP	Games played	GS	Games started	MPG	Minutes per game
FG%	Field goal percentage	3P%	3-point field goal percentage	FT%	Free throw percentage
RPG	Rebounds per game	APG	Assists per game	SPG	Steals per game
BPG	Blocks per game	PPG	Points per game	**Bold**	Career high

=== NBA ===
==== Regular season ====
Year	Team	GP	GS	MPG	FG%	3P%	FT%	RPG	APG	SPG	BPG	PPG
1975–76	Houston	**81**		25.2	.494		.644	6.4	1.0	.4	1.5	10.2
1976–77	Atlanta	74		**27.9**	.526		.714	**8.1**	1.1	.6	1.1	**11.1**
1977–78	New Orleans	54		23.6	.472		.654	6.9	1.1	.3	**2.2**	8.8
1978–79	New Orleans	36		17.8	.449		.654	5.1	.9	.5	1.1	6.1
1978–79	New York	41	26	25.7	.505		.688	5.5	**1.2**	.6	1.3	9.5
1979–80	New York	65	30	24.1	.528	.000	.645	5.4	1.0	.6	1.8	9.0
1980–81	Kansas City	74		20.5	.496	–	.695	5.3	1.0	.4	1.1	7.6
1981–82	Kansas City	18	10	21.1	.516	–	**.775**	4.9	.9	**.7**	1.2	6.9
1982–83	Kansas City	78	**74**	21.9	**.570**		.626	5.4	.8	.6	1.1	7.9
1983–84	Kansas City	73	31	20.6	.532		.764	4.8	.7	.5	.8	6.6
1984–85	Kansas City	76	4	14.0	.498	**.500**	.774	3.5	.4	.2	.4	4.5
Career		670	175	22.1	.511	.333	.687	5.6	.9	.5	1.2	8.1

==== Playoffs ====
Year	Team	GP	MPG	FG%	3P%	FT%	RPG	APG	SPG	BPG	PPG
1981	Kansas City	10	19.9	.490	–	.571	3.1	.5	.5	.7	5.6

== See also ==
- List of National Basketball Association players with most blocks in a game
