= Khalia Collier =

American basketball executive

- Education: Missouri Baptist University
- Occupation: Global Women's Basketball Association (GWBA)

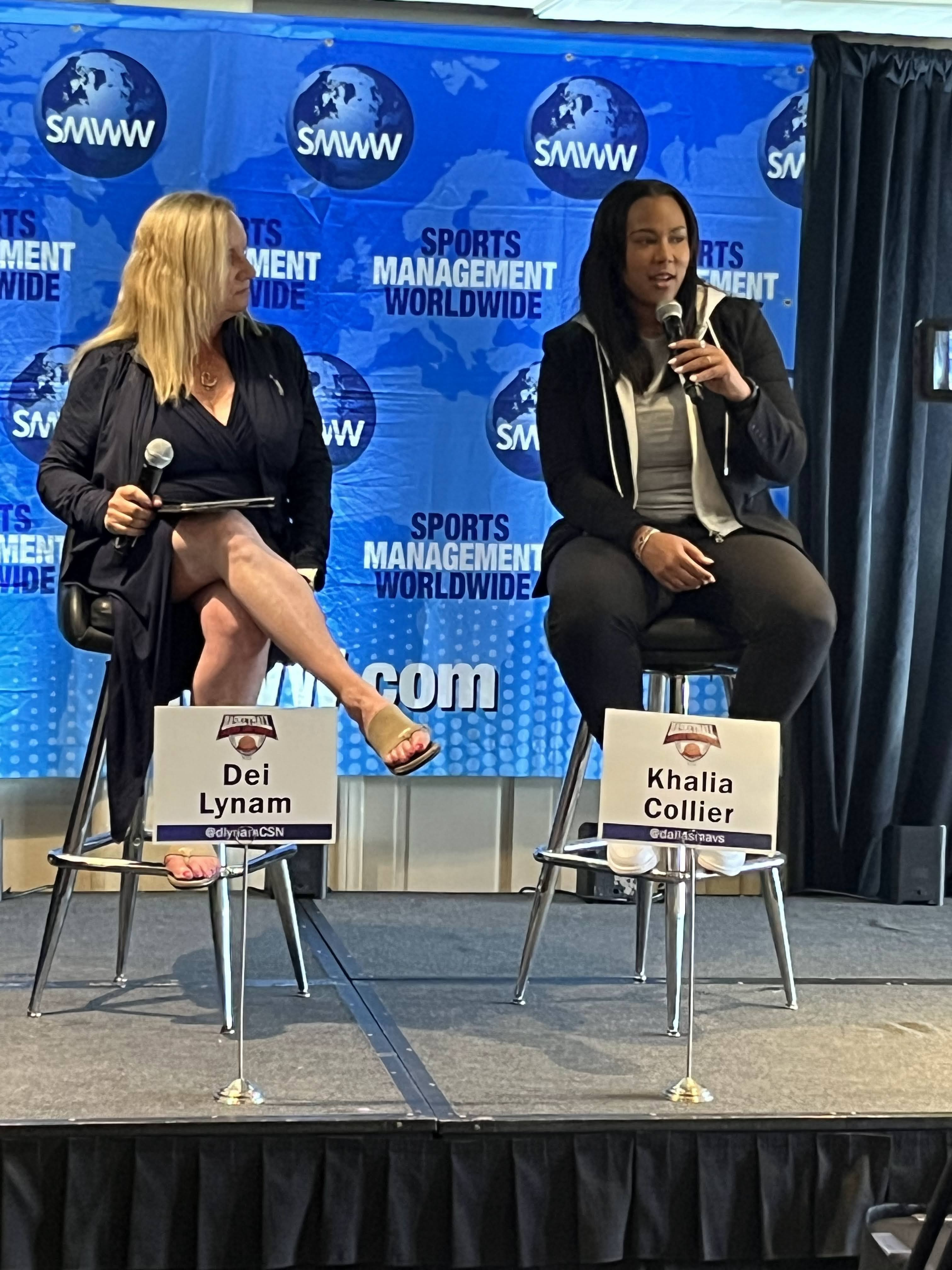
Dei Lynam(left) and Khalia Collier(right) at the 2024 SMWW Basketball Career Conference.

Khalia Collier is the owner of the St. Louis Surge, and commissioner of its league the Global Women's Basketball Association (GWBA). Collier formerly served as the associate director at the Saint Louis University Chaifetz School of Business. In October 2020, she became Vice President of Community Relations for the Saint Louis Soccer Club

== Life and career ==
Collier was born and raised in St. Louis. Collier played for Fort Zumwalt South High School and college basketball at Columbia College and Missouri Baptist University. Graduating with a degree in communications, Collier went on to work for a Fortune 500 company, but quickly returned to basketball, purchasing the Surge in 2011. As a member of the Women's Blue Chip Basketball League, the Surge won two championships under Collier's direction. As of 2019, the Surge have moved to the GWBA, where Collier also serves as the league's commissioner. The Surge play home games at the Washington University in St. Louis Field House.

She is also an annual "SMWW Basketball Career Conference" speaker for the online sports-career training school Sports Management Worldwide, founded and run by Dr. Lynn Lashbrook.
