= Minnesota Black Ice =

- Founded: 2014
- League: WBCBL
- Team history: Minnesota Black Ice (2014–present)
- Based in: Minneapolis, Minnesota
- Arena: North Central University
- Colors: Red, yellow, white
- Owner: Dedric Willis 2014–2015; TBA 2016.
- Head coach: Melissa Young
- Website: official website

The Minnesota Black Ice is a semi-professional women's basketball team of the Women's Blue Chip Basketball League. Founded in 2014, the Black Ice play its home games at North Central University in Minneapolis.

== History ==
Minnesota Black Ice played their first-ever game on May 17, 2014, losing to the visiting Kansas Nuggets, 80–75. Minnesota led 63–60 going into the final quarter of play, but could not hold on for the victory. Former Minnesota Golden Gophers center Ashley Ellis-Milan led all scorers with 21 points and grabbed eight rebounds.

The team picked up the first win in franchise history on May 24, 2014, by defeating St. Louis Surge 48–46. It was the only loss the Surge suffered all season, finishing 14–1 and winning the WBCBL championship. Minnesota ended their inaugural season at 3–5, fifth place in the six-team WBCBL Midwest Division.

== Season-by-season record ==
Season	W	L	Playoffs W-L	Playoffs Result
2014	3	5	0–0	DNQ
2015	TBD	TBD	TBD	TBD
