= Laurie Byrd =

American basketball player and coach

Personal information
- Listed height: 5 ft 7 in (1.70 m)

Career information
- College: Eastern Michigan (1978–1982)

Career highlights
- First-team All-MAC (1982)

Laurie Byrd is a basketball coach and former basketball player from Flint, Michigan. She is sister to the professional boxer Chris Byrd.

== College ==
A graduate of Hamady High School in Flint, Michigan, Byrd joined the Eastern Michigan Hurons women's basketball team, which had just begun play the year before. During her collegiate career from 1978 through 1982, she led the team in both scoring and assists. Her 1,899 points was the EMU basketball scoring record (men and women) until surpassed in December, 2011, by Tavelyn James. In January, 2011, she became the fourth basketball player and the first women's basketball player to have her jersey retired by Eastern Michigan, joining George Gervin, Grant Long, and Kennedy McIntosh.

== Professional ==
From 1984 through 1999, Byrd played professional basketball in Spain, Italy, Switzerland, and Sweden. She also played for the Detroit Dazzlers of the Liberty Basketball Association (leading scoring in the league's first game), the Atlanta Glory (1996–1997) and the San Jose Lasers (1997–1998) of the American Basketball League (ABL) as well as the Kentucky Marauders and the Chicago Spirits of the Women's Basketball Association. In 1998, at age 38, Byrd was the oldest player in the ABL. In 1999 and 2000 she was on the training camp roster for the Detroit Shock of the Women's National Basketball Association.

== Coaching career ==
From 1999 through 2002 she was an assistant coach for the University of Detroit Titans. From 2003 to 2005 she was an assistant coach for the Detroit Shock, who won a WNBA Championship in 2003. In 2007, she was the director of player personnel for the Houston Comets and in 2008 she became an assistant coach for the Comets. In 2009 and 2010 she was an assistant coach with the New York Liberty, and in 2011 she was an assistant coach for the Washington Mystics
