= Rosy Lamb =

- Born: 1973 (age 52–53); Tamworth, New Hampshire, United States
- Education: Pennsylvania Academy of Fine Arts, Philadelphia
- Known for: Painting, Sculpture

Rosy Lamb (born 1973 in Tamworth, New Hampshire) is an expatriate American sculptor, painter and author living in Paris, France. She graduated from the Pennsylvania Academy of the Fine Arts, and became the assistante d'atelier of the sculptor Jean Cardot, before her work gained attention in its own right.

== Life ==
Lamb was homeschooled by her parents, both artists, with her four siblings in New Hampshire. She entered the Pennsylvania Academy of the Fine Arts, from which she graduated with concentrations in sculpture and painting. During her undergraduate years, she also attended the Harvard Extension School intermittently.

She left Philadelphia for France in 2001, where she worked for the sculptor Jean Cardot. That move served as a springboard for Lamb's own work and international career.

== Career ==
Lamb's art traces three axes -- drawings, painting and sculpture—which inevitably intersect. She draws in conté, charcoal and mixed media; she paints on linen or board, mixed media on plaster, or with watercolor; she sculpts in plaster, or bronze, or resin and mixed media on plaster.

In Europe, she has shown in the Luxembourg Garden, sponsored by the Sénat, or the French Senate. She exhibited a painting at the BP Portrait Award 2010 show at London's National Portrait Gallery. In the United States, she has had solo shows in Philadelphia, Boston and New Jersey.

She was awarded the George Coulin prize for sculpture by the Institut de France in 2002, and held an Artist in Residence fellowship at the Cité internationale des arts in Paris from 2001 to 2003.

In December 2013 she published a picture book, Paul Meets Bernadette, a simple story about two fish. This was achieved with the help of her father, Albert Lamb, also a picture book author. Kirkus Reviews described the book as a "lovely, debatably romantic ode in oils".
