= Mauricio Escanero =

Mexican career diplomat

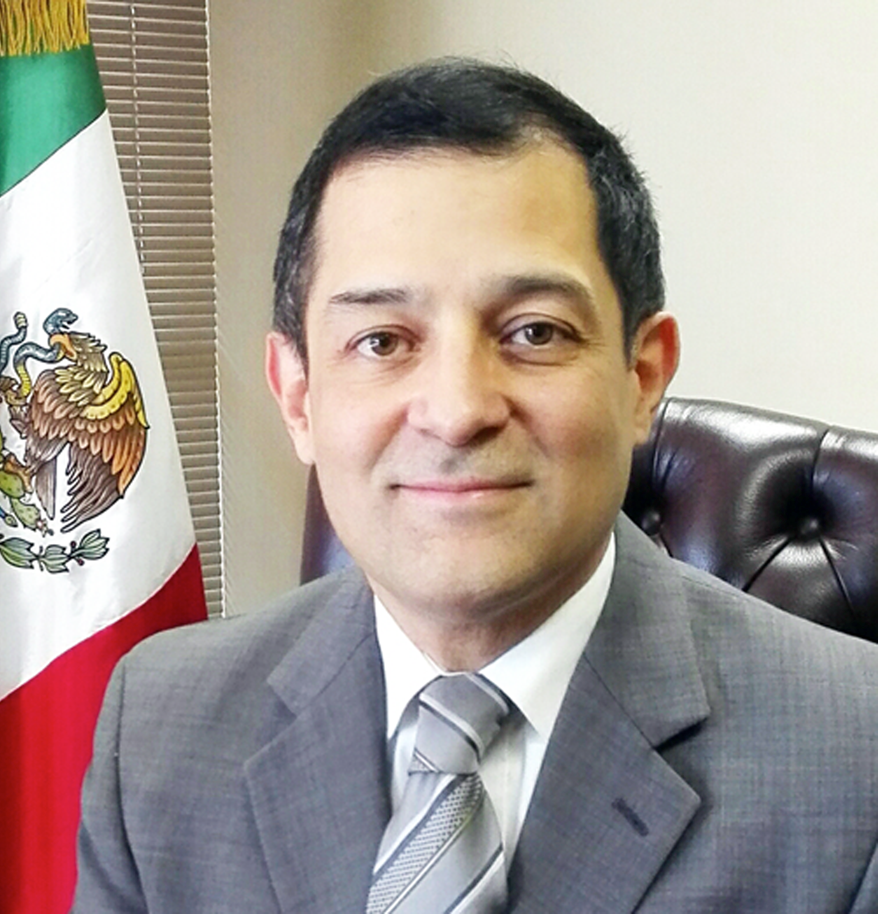

Head of the Mission of Mexico to the European Union and Ambassador to the Kingdom of Belgium and the Grand Duchy of Luxembourg

Ambassador Mauricio Escanero is a Mexican career diplomat, who has experience in bilateral and multilateral diplomacy as well as international responsibilities both at the United Nations (UN) and at the United Nations Educational, Scientific and Cultural Organization(UNESCO).

== International Responsibilities ==
In his personal capacity, elected by the United Nations Member States, he served as Facilitator of the Monterrey Consensus and the International Conference on Financing for Development from 1998 to 2002.

As Mexico's Special Envoy to the First High Level Meeting of the Global Partnership for Effective Development Cooperation (Mexico, 2014), and by agreement of the Steering Committee of the Global Partnership, he served as Facilitator of its final communiqué.

In his personal capacity, elected by the States Parties, he served as the founding Chairperson of the Committee of the 1970 Convention of UNESCO on the Means of Prohibiting and Preventing the Illicit Import, Export and Transfer of Ownership of Cultural Property on 2013–2015. He was also the initiator of the First Meeting of Chairpersons of the Committees of UNESCO's Cultural Conventions, held on 29 June 2015.
