= Black Archives of Mid-America =

The Black Archives of Mid-America also known as BAMA is a learning and research center located in Kansas City, Missouri, focused on the African American experience in the central Midwest.

== History ==
The Black Archives of Mid-America is an archive that collects and preserves materials documenting the political, social and cultural histories of persons of African American descent in the central United States, with a focus on the Kansas City, Missouri region. The Black Archives of Mid-America honors the African-American community heritage of Mid-America, spreading awareness of this history by providing educational resources and sharing its collection to researchers, exhibitions, and publications. The Black Archives of Mid-America holds an oral history collection collected in the mid-1970s comprising 97 audiocassettes, holding interviews of 56 people, mostly from Kansas City's African American community.
