= Sports in the Kansas City metropolitan area =

Overview of sports in Kansas City metropolitan area

The Kansas City metropolitan area has a long history of sports, which has included national championship teams and championship title events.

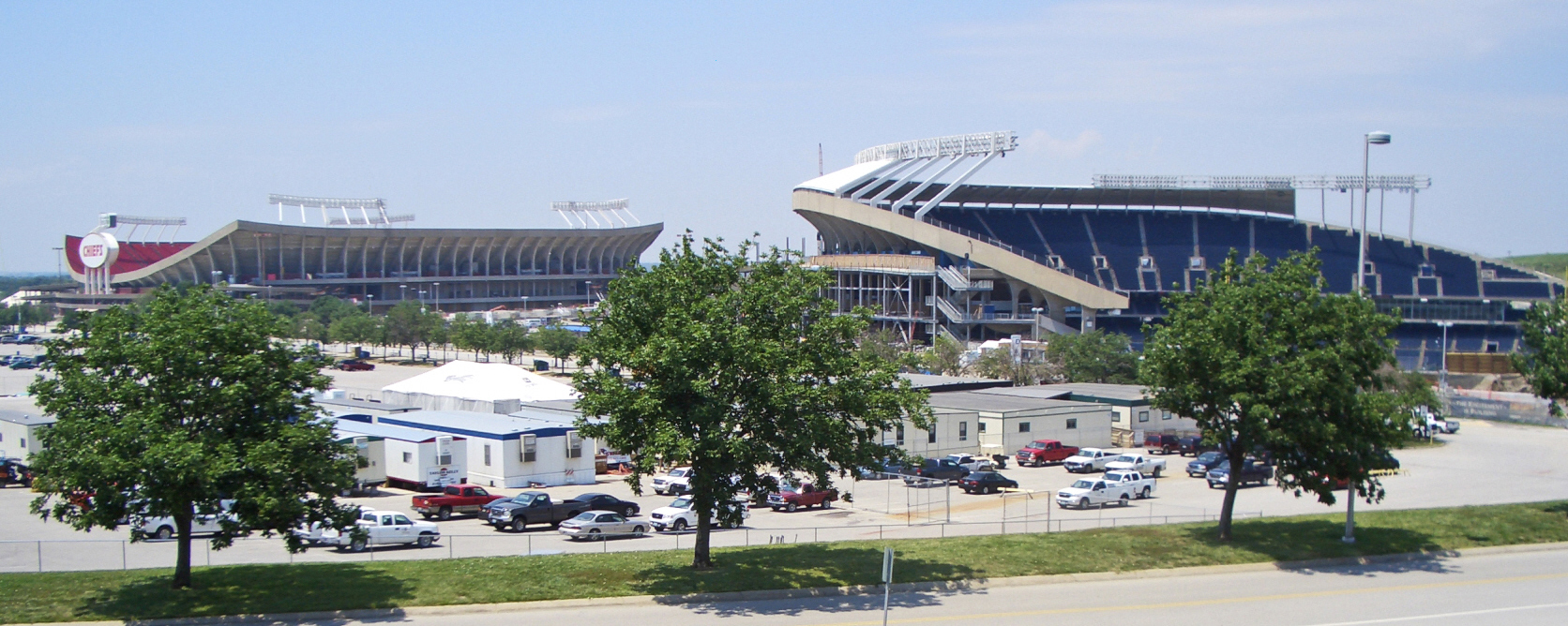
Truman Sports Complex, with Arrowhead and Kaufmann Stadiums, opened in Kansas City, Missouri, in the 1972 and 1973 sports seasons.

== Major professional teams ==
Club	Sport	League	Founded	Venue	Titles
Kansas City Chiefs	American football	National Football League	1963	Arrowhead Stadium	4
Kansas City Royals	Baseball	Major League Baseball	1969	Kauffman Stadium	2
Sporting Kansas City	Soccer	Major League Soccer	1996	Sporting Park	2
Kansas City Current	Soccer	National Women's Soccer League	2020	CPKC Stadium	1

Kansas City has had teams in all five of the major professional sports leagues; three major league teams remain today. The Kansas City Royals of Major League Baseball became the first American League expansion team to reach the playoffs (1976), to reach the World Series (1980), and to win the World Series (1985; against the state-rival St. Louis Cardinals in the "Show-Me Series"). They did not make the playoffs again until 2014, winning the American League pennant before falling in a seven-game World Series to the San Francisco Giants. The Royals would return to the World Series in 2015, defeating the New York Mets in five games, clinching the title with a 7–2 win in 12 innings.

Since moving to the city in 1963, the Kansas City Chiefs won the AFL title in 1966, ultimately losing Super Bowl I to the Green Bay Packers, and again in 1969 as the last ever AFL champion, en route to their first Super Bowl win. They won Super Bowl IV against the Minnesota Vikings, 23–7. 50 years later, they would win Super Bowl LIV 31–20 against the San Francisco 49ers. In 2023, they won Super Bowl LVII over the Philadelphia Eagles with the score of 38-35, marking their second Super Bowl victory over the last four seasons and third Super Bowl title in franchise history.

Sporting Kansas City of Major League Soccer (MLS) plays its home games at Sporting Park, formerly named Children's Mercy Park, and Livestrong Sporting Park. Kansas City has won the MLS Cup twice — first in 2000 by defeating the Chicago Fire 1–0, and next in 2013 by beating Real Salt Lake at Sporting Park. Kansas City has won the Lamar Hunt U.S. Open Cup four times — first in 2004 by beating the Chicago Fire, next in 2012 by beating the Seattle Sounders at Sporting Park, again in 2015 by beating the Philadelphia Union, and most recently in 2017 by beating the New York Red Bulls. Kansas City was previously represented by the Kansas City Spurs in the top-level North American Soccer League (NASL) from 1968 to 1970. The Spurs captured the NASL championship in 1969, but were dissolved shortly after the 1970 NASL season.

The Lamar Hunt U.S. Open Cup is named for Lamar Hunt; while he was best known as the founding owner of the Chiefs, he was also a principal founder of both the original North American Soccer League (NASL) and Major League Soccer (MLS).

In the three most prominent women's professional leagues (the WNBA, the National Women's Soccer League, and the Professional Women's Hockey League), Kansas City has had two teams, both in the NWSL. FC Kansas City was one of the league's eight inaugural teams in 2013, but management issues led to the team being folded after the 2017 season, with its playing-related assets transferred to the first Utah Royals. That team ceased operations after the 2020 season, and its playing-related assets were transferred to a new Kansas City ownership group. The new Kansas City team played its first season in 2021 under the placeholder name Kansas City NWSL before adopting its permanent name of Kansas City Current the next season.

== Major league professional championships ==
=== Kansas City Chiefs (NFL) ===
4 Super Bowl titles

- 1969 (IV)
- 2019 (LIV)
- 2022 (LVII)
- 2023 (LVIII)

2 American Football League (AFL) Championship Titles

- 1966 (AFL 1966)
- 1969 (AFL 1969)

The Franchise has another AFL Title as the Dallas Texans in 1962 before moving to Kansas City.

=== Kansas City Royals (MLB) ===
2 World Series titles

- 1985
- 2015

=== Kansas City Monarchs (NNL / NAL) ===
2 Negro World Series titles

- 1924
- 1942

=== Kansas City Spurs (NASL) ===
1 NASL title

- 1969

=== Sporting Kansas City (MLS) ===
2 MLS Cup titles

- 2000
- 2013

=== FC Kansas City (NWSL) ===
2 NWSL titles

- 2014
- 2015

=== Kansas City Current (NWSL) ===
1 NWSL title

- 2026

== Other current teams ==
Club	Sport	Founded	League	Venue
Kansas City Outlaws	Rodeo	2022	Professional Bull Riders	T-Mobile Center
Kansas City Comets	Indoor soccer	2010	Major Arena Soccer League	Cable Dahmer Arena
Kansas City Mavericks	Ice hockey	2009	ECHL	Cable Dahmer Arena
Kansas City Monarchs	Baseball	2003	American Association	Legends Field
Sporting Kansas City II	Soccer	2016	MLS Next Pro	Rock Chalk Park
Kansas City Grillers	Basketball	2018	American Basketball Association	Hy-Vee Arena
Kansas City Goats	Arena football	2023	The Arena League	Municipal Arena
Sunflower State FC	Soccer	2017	USL League Two, Women's Premier Soccer League	The Pembroke Hill School
Santafé Wanderers FC	Soccer	1998	USL League Two	Stanley H. Durwood Soccer Stadium and Recreational Field
Kansas City Stampede	Quadball	2016	MLQ	Various
Kansas City Diamonds	Softball	2026	Professional Softball League (PSL)	Legends Field

== College sports ==
Program	School	Location	Division	Primary conference
Kansas City Roos	University of Missouri–Kansas City	Kansas City, Missouri	NCAA Division I	Summit League
Rockhurst Hawks	Rockhurst University	Kansas City, Missouri	NCAA Division II	Great Lakes Valley Conference
William Jewell Cardinals	William Jewell College	Liberty, Missouri	NCAA Division II	Great Lakes Valley Conference
Avila Eagles	Avila University	Kansas City, Missouri	NAIA	Kansas Collegiate Athletic Conference
Baker Wildcats	Baker University	Baldwin City, Kansas	NAIA	Heart of America Athletic Conference
MidAmerica Nazarene Pioneers	MidAmerica Nazarene University	Olathe, Kansas	NAIA	Heart of America Athletic Conference
Park Pirates	Park University	Parkville, Missouri	NAIA	Heart of America Athletic Conference
Saint Mary Spires	University of Saint Mary	Leavenworth, Kansas	NAIA	Kansas Collegiate Athletic Conference

== Past teams ==
In 1926, the NFL added the Kansas City Blues and later renamed the club to the Kansas City Cowboys (NFL) in 1926. The club folded in 1927.

In 1972, Kansas City gained an NBA franchise, when the Kansas City-Omaha Kings – which had originated as the Rochester Royals, before becoming the Cincinnati Royals – relocated to the city from Cincinnati; the Kings split their home games between Kansas City and Omaha, Nebraska until 1975, when the team began playing its games exclusively in Kansas City, shortening its name to the Kansas City Kings. In 1985, the Kings relocated to Sacramento, California, becoming the Sacramento Kings.

In 1974, the National Hockey League (NHL) added an expansion team in Kansas City, when the Kansas City Scouts began play. The team would suffer due to an economic downturn in the Midwest. For their second season, the Scouts sold just 2,000 of 8,000 season tickets and were almost $1 million in debt. Due to their various on- and off-ice disappointments, the franchise moved to Denver before settling on the East Coast as the New Jersey Devils.

The Kansas Crusaders won the 1993 Women's Professional Basketball WBA Championship and the Kansas City Mustangs went undefeated in 1994.

Club	Sport	Years of Operation	League	Venue	Fate
FC Kansas City	Women's soccer	2013–2017	National Women's Soccer League	Children's Mercy Victory Field	Folded and roster transferred to Utah Royals FC. The latter team folded after the 2020 season and its roster was transferred to Kansas City NWSL, now known as the Kansas City Current
Kansas City Athletics	Baseball	1955–1967	Major League Baseball	Municipal Stadium	Moved to Oakland
Kansas City Attack/Comets	Indoor soccer	1991–2005	National Professional Soccer League (1991–2001); Major Indoor Soccer League (2001–2005)	Municipal Auditorium, Kemper Arena	Suspended operations for 2005–06 and 2006–07 seasons
Kansas City Blades	Ice hockey	1990–2001	International Hockey League	Kemper Arena	League folded
Kansas City Blue Stockings	Baseball	1902–1903	Western League	Sportsman's Park	Franchise folded
Kansas City Blues	Baseball	1887–1901	Western League/Western Association/American League (1900)	Exposition Park	Became the Washington Senators, now Minnesota Twins
Kansas City Blues	Baseball	1902–1954	American Association (1902–1997)	Blues Stadium	Moved to Colorado, now the Wichita Wind Surge (TL)
Kansas City Blues/Cowboys	Football	1924–1926	National Football League		Team folded
Kansas City Comets	Indoor soccer	1981–1991	Major Indoor Soccer League	Kemper Arena	Team folded
Kansas City Command	Arena football	2006–2012	Arena Football League	Kemper Arena, Sprint Center	Team folded
Kansas City Cowboys	Baseball	1884	Union Association	Association Park	League folded; team moved to the minor league Western League
Kansas City Cowboys	Baseball	1886	National League (1886)	Association Park	Team folded; players sold to the Pittsburgh Alleghenys
Kansas City Cowboys	Baseball	1888–1889	American Association (1888–89)	Exposition Park	Team folded
Kansas City Explorers	Tennis	1993–2012	World TeamTennis	Barney Allis Plaza	Moved to Irving, Texas, and became the Texas Wild
Kansas City Giants	Baseball	1909–1911	Western Independent Clubs	Riverside Park	Team folded
Kansas City Kings	Basketball	1972–1985	National Basketball Association	Municipal Auditorium, Kemper Arena	Moved to Sacramento
Kansas City Knights	Basketball	2000–2005	American Basketball Association	Kemper Arena, Hale Arena	Suspended operations for 2005–06 season
Kansas City Maroons	Baseball	1887–1890	Negro leagues / Barnstorming	Exposition Park	Team folded
Kansas City Monarchs	Baseball	1920–1955	Negro National League (1920–1930), Negro American League (1930–1955)	Blues Stadium	Became full-time barnstorming team until 1965. Not related to the current Kansas City Monarchs, which renamed itself from T-Bones in 2021 in honor of the Negro leagues team.
Kansas City Mustangs	Women's basketball	1992–1996	WBA-Kansas Crusaders (1992–1994), Women's Basketball Association (1995–1996)	Municipal Auditorium	League folded
Kansas City Outlaws	Ice hockey	2004–2005	United Hockey League	Kemper Arena	Team folded
Kansas City Packers	Baseball	1914-1915	Federal League	Gordon and Koppel Field	League folded
Kansas City Phantoms	Indoor football	2017–2018	Champions Indoor Football	Silverstein Eye Centers Arena	Team folded
Kansas City Renegades	Indoor football	2013	Champions Professional Indoor Football League	Kemper Arena	Team folded
Kansas City Royal Giants	Baseball	1910–1912	Western Independent Clubs	Shelley Park	Team folded
Kansas City Scouts	Ice hockey	1974–1976	National Hockey League	Kemper Arena	Moved to Colorado; now the New Jersey Devils
Kansas City Spurs	Soccer	1968–1970	North American Soccer League	Municipal Stadium	Team folded
Kansas City Steers	Basketball	1961–1963	American Basketball League	Municipal Auditorium	League folded
Kansas City Tornadoes	Basketball	2018–2019	The Basketball League	Hy-Vee Arena	Folded

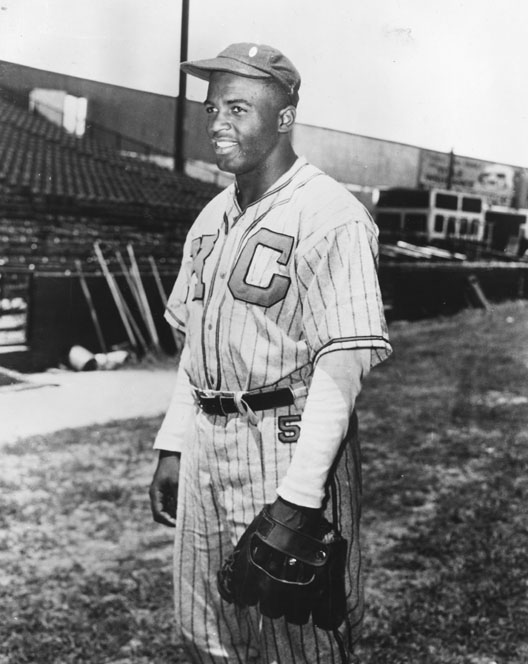
Jackie Robinson during his stint in the Negro leagues with the Kansas City Monarchs

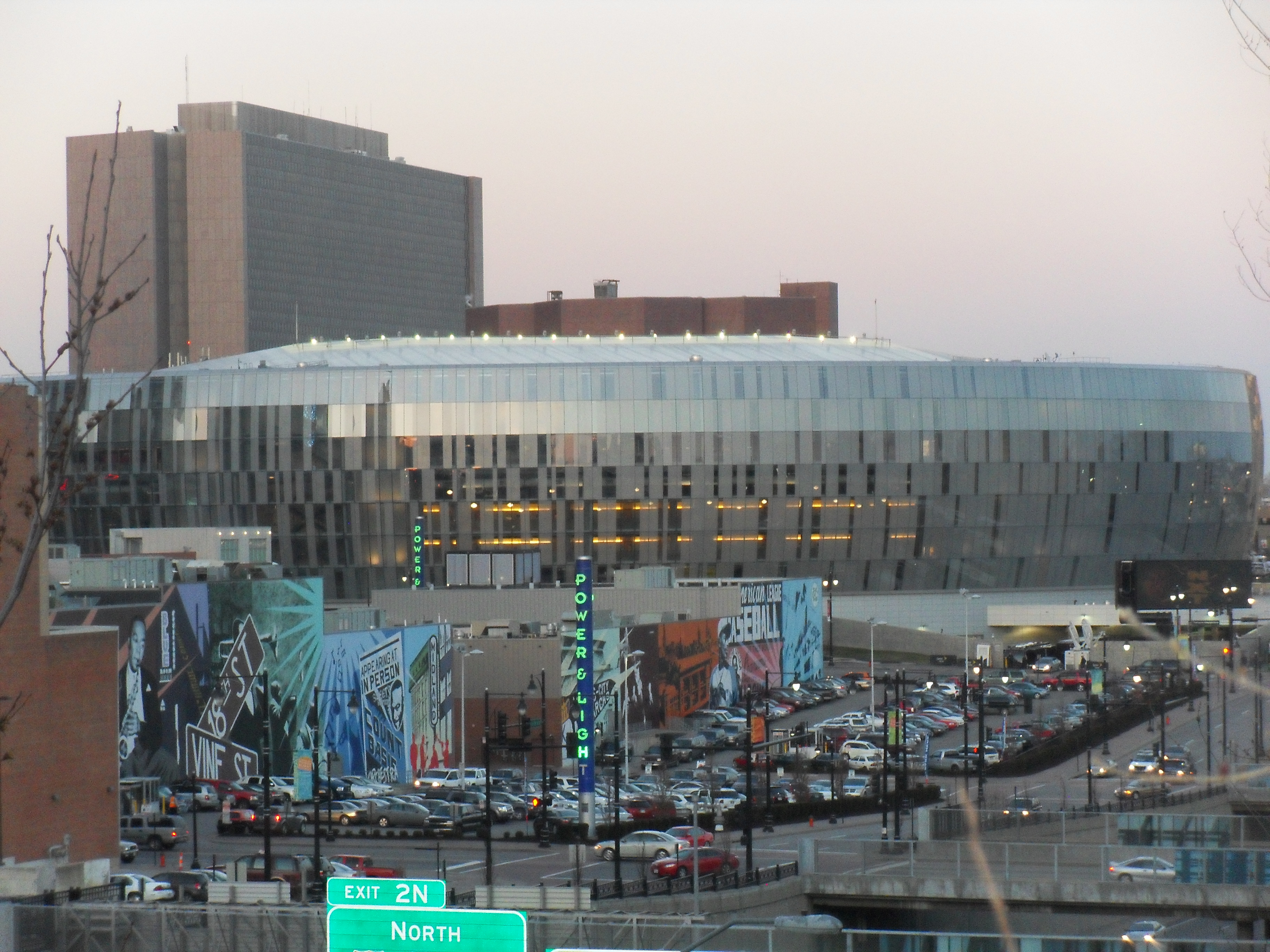
T-Mobile Center in downtown Kansas City

== Sporting events ==
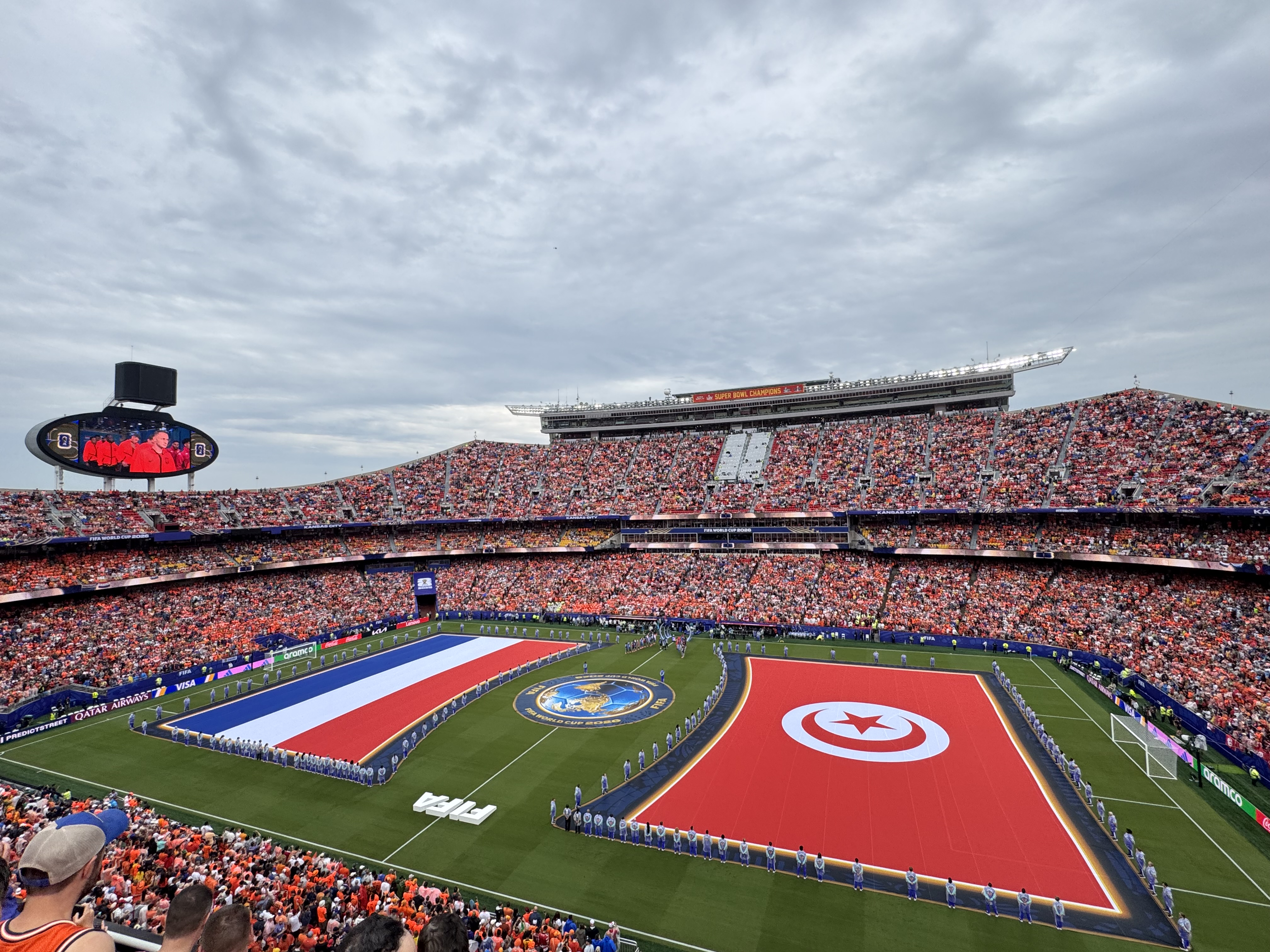
Prior to the Netherlands vs Tunisia match at the 2026 FIFA World Cup at Arrowhead Stadium.

- Kansas City is in Missouri. often the home of the Big 12 Basketball Tournaments. The men's tournament is played at T-Mobile Center, while the women's tournament has often played at Municipal Auditorium. Lately newer arenas in Dallas and Oklahoma City have hosted both tournaments.
- Arrowhead Stadium serves as the venue for various intercollegiate football games. Often it was the host of the Big 12 Football Title Game. On the last weekend in October, the Fall Classic rivalry game between Northwest Missouri State University and Pittsburg State University takes place here. Usually, the Bearcats of Northwest and Gorillas of Pitt State are ranked one-two in the MIAA conference. In 2005, other games at Arrowhead included Arkansas State playing host to Missouri, and Kansas hosting Oklahoma. The stadium was one of eleven venues in the US that hosted matches during the 2026 FIFA World Cup.
- Kansas Speedway, located in Kansas City, Kansas, hosts many auto racing events, including two NASCAR race weekends with the Cup Series and Truck Series in the spring and the Cup Series and Xfinity Series in the fall. The track formerly hosted a race in the IndyCar Series.
- Kansas City has also hosted the 1973 Major League Baseball All-Star Game and the 2012 Major League Baseball All-Star Game at Kauffman Stadium as well as the 2013 MLS All-Star Game at the venue now known as Sporting Park. In 2006, Kansas City was awarded Super Bowl XLIX, but a vote for a rolling roof to be put over Arrowhead and Kauffman Stadiums was voted down, eliminating that possibility.
- Children's Mercy Park hosted the 2013 MLS Cup Final, with Sporting KC defeating Real Salt Lake in penalty kicks
- Kansas City hosted the 2023 NFL draft. The draft was held outside of Kansas City Union Station from April 27 to April 29, 2023. The event site was 3.1 million square feet.

== Sports headquarters ==
Kansas City and nearby Overland Park, Kansas were once the home of the National Collegiate Athletic Association, and has hosted ten men's final fours, more than any other city. However, Kansas City will be unable to host an 11th Final Four due to the NCAA's requirement starting with the 1997 tournament that all Final Four venues have a minimum seating capacity of 30,000.

In recognition of Kansas City's ten final fours, the National Association of Basketball Coaches are based in the city, and operates a full-time museum in the new Sprint Center, which opened in 2007 and is now known as T-Mobile Center.

Kansas City is home to the Mid–America Intercollegiate Athletics Association, an NCAA Division II conference of 14 schools in Kansas, Missouri, Nebraska and Oklahoma. The National Association of Intercollegiate Athletics was formed in Kansas City. The NAIA national men's basketball tournament takes place each year in Kansas City's Municipal Auditorium.

The Negro Leagues Baseball Museum is located in the 18th and Vine district.
