= Internet Party Line =

Defunct internet telephony and conference software

Internet Party Line (or simply iParty) was one of the first Internet telephony and conference software for Microsoft Windows. It was made by Intel and released as an experimental prototype in 1995. It featured a push-to-talk method of sending audio, in which each received audio clip was played in order without mixing, regardless of multiple people talking simultaneously. In this way, it addressed the problem of how to have an understandable group conversation in the face of large Internet latencies or low bandwidth.

Similar applications like iParty include Microsoft NetMeeting and VocalTec Internet Phone. Today, most of these older conference applications have been replaced by VoIP applications such as Skype.

== Sources ==
- Scott Hamilton, Janet Wilson, Andrew Grove's Vision for the Internet, Computer, vol. 30, no. 4, pp. 14–15, Apr., 1997
