= Logan Kilpatrick =

American software engineer

- Education: Harvard University (ALB, ALM)
- Occupation: Product Manager

Logan Kilpatrick is an American product manager who is a product lead for Google AI Studio. Before joining Google in 2024, Kilpatrick led developer relations at OpenAI.

== Career ==
Logan Kilpatrick worked as machine-learning engineer at Apple, advised NASA on open-source policy, and also worked at The Walt Disney Company, before joining OpenAI November 2022, where he led developer relations until March 2024. He joined Google in April 2024, to work on Gemini API through Google AI Studio, where he said would become "the best home for developers".

== Views ==
In December 2024, Kilpatrick said he believes that aiming straight for artificial superintelligence (ASI) without focusing on intermediate milestones was "looking more and more probable by the month." He believes that scaling up test-time compute is a "good indication" of the possibility of reaching ASI directly. He is an advocate for the Julia programming language.
