= St. Louis Surge =

American women's basketball team

The St. Louis Surge was a professional women's basketball team based in St. Louis, Missouri. The Surge was a member of the Global Women's Basketball Association (GWBA) and played home games at Washington University in St. Louis' Field House Complex.

== History ==
Founded in 2011, the Surge played seven seasons and won two national championships and five regional championships in the Women’s Blue-Chip Basketball League (WBCBL) before moving to the GWBA. The GWBA featured five teams, and the Surge's owner, Khalia Collier, served as the league's commissioner. The league aimed to grow women's basketball by featuring teams in locations lacking the sport, and teams play games in university facilities, or in the case of the Wisconsin GLO, in the Wisconsin Herd's NBA G League arena. The Surge's head coach was Duez Henderson, who was a four-year player for The University of Iowa.

=== Folding ===
Despite announcing the upcoming season schedule in June 2024, the season was abruptly canceled without any further word from the league, which did not respond to requests for comment from local news organizations. Other stations connected the cancellation to the documented financial problems affecting the championship venue, the Oshkosh Arena.

== Roster ==
| Player | Position |
|---|---|
| Kelsey McClure | Point Guard |
| Treyvonna Brooks | Forward |
| Nakiah Bell | Point Guard |
| Mikala McGhee | Small Forward |
| Nici Gilday | Guard |
| Rebecca Harris | Guard |
| Kristi Bellock | Forward |
| Sydney Bauman | Center |
| Brittany Carter | Guard |
| Leti Lerma | Forward |
| Jaleesa Butler | Forward |
| Marina Laramie | Forward |
