= Women's Basketball Association =

Women's basketball league running from 1992 to 1995

The Women's Basketball Association (WBA or WWBA) was the first women's professional basketball summer league, operating from 1992 to 1995. The league was called the WWBA and WBA for the first All-Star tour in 1992, before settling on WBA. The pioneer league was formed in 1992 by Lightning N Mitchell and played three full seasons from 1993 to 1995.

The WBA played a 15-game schedule, and games were broadcast on Liberty Sports of Dallas. The All-Star games were also televised on Fox Sports. Kansas Jayhawks All-American Geri "Kay-Kay" Hart and Robelyn "Robbie" Garcia announced the game on Fox Radio and Nancy Lieberman was the TV announcer for the 1995 All-Star game. The team was featured on the cover of the Star Magazine, an arts publication run by the Kansas City Star from 1924 until the late 1990s. USA Today did a story on the Kansas City Mustangs coached by Joe C. Meriweather, and included a full-team picture.

The WBA played three full seasons, with plans to play as a 12-team league in 1997, but disbanded before the season began. When Fox Sports purchased Liberty Sports and the WBA, they dissolved the league shortly after and sold off the franchising rights. The league was the first American professional women's basketball league to be successful as a summer league, like their counterpart WNBA.

Guard Laurie Byrd played for the WWBA, WBA, American Basketball League and WNBA.

== WBA Champions ==
- 1993 – Kansas Crusaders – MVP: Robelyn Garcia
- 1994 – Nebraska Express – MVP: Maurtice Ivy (Tice)
- 1995 – Chicago Twisters – MVP: Diana Vines

== 1993 WBA regular season ==
World Conference

Team	W	L	PCT	GB
Kansas Crusaders	10	5	.667	–
Iowa Unicorns	5	10	.333	5
Illinois Knights	4	11	.267	6

American Conference

Team	W	L	PCT	GB
Nebraska Express	13	2	.867	–
Missouri Mustangs	10	5	.667	3
Oklahoma Cougars	3	12	.200	10

MVP: Sarah Campbell

WBA 1st Round Playoffs
Missouri 2–1 over Iowa
Iowa 119, Missouri 103
Missouri 98, Iowa 93
Missouri 117, Iowa 112 (OT)

Kansas 2–0 over Oklahoma
Kansas 92, Oklahoma 77
Kansas 114, Oklahoma 64

Nebraska 2–0 over Illinois
Nebraska 166, Illinois 129
Nebraska 127, Illinois 115

WBA 2nd Round Playoffs
Kansas 2–0 over Missouri
Kansas 121, Missouri 97
Kansas 109, Missouri 99

1993 WBA Championship (best-of five)
Kansas 3–1 over Nebraska
Kansas 125, Nebraska 119
Nebraska 118, Kansas 100
Kansas 111, Nebraska 96
First WBA Championship: Kansas 100, Nebraska 98
MVP: Robelyn "Robbie" Garcia

== 1994 WBA regular season ==
National Conference

Team	W	L	PCT	GB
y-Kansas City Mustangs	15	0	1.000	–
x-Memphis Blues	10	5	.667	5
x-St. Louis River Queens	9	6	.600	6
Kansas Marauders	4	11	.267	11

American Conference

Team	W	L	PCT	GB
y-Nebraska Express	10	5	.667	–
x-Indiana Stars	8	7	.533	2
x-Oklahoma Cougars	3	12	.200	7
Iowa Twisters	1	14	.067	9

MVP: Evette Ott, Sarah Campbell

WBA 1st Round Playoffs
Memphis 2–0 over St. Louis
Memphis 126, St. Louis 111
Memphis 122, St. Louis 110

Indiana 2–0 over Oklahoma
Indiana 107, Oklahoma 91
Indiana 103, Oklahoma 91

WBA 2nd Round Playoffs (Best out of 2 or the total number of points score in 2 games)
Memphis won series in Points (195–185)
Kansas City 98, Memphis 94
Memphis 101, Kansas City 87

Nebraska won series by winning 2–0 over Indiana
Nebraska 99, Indiana 89
Nebraska 91, Indiana 87

1994 WBA Championship (best-of five)
Nebraska 3–2 over Memphis
Memphis 102, Nebraska 101
Nebraska 123, Memphis 108
Memphis 138, Nebraska 128
Nebraska 111, Memphis 101
Nebraska 103, Memphis 101

MVP: Maurtice (Tice) Ivy

== 1995 WBA regular season ==
National Conference

Team	W	L	PCT	GB
y-St. Louis River Queens	8	7	.533	–
Kansas City Mustangs	7	8	.467	1
Kentucky Marauders	7	8	.467	1
Memphis Blues	7	8	.467	1

American Conference

Team	W	L	PCT	GB
y-Chicago Twisters	14	1	.938	–
Nebraska Express	6	9	.400	8
Minnesota Stars	5	10	.333	9
Oklahoma Flames	5	10	.333	9

MVP: Evette Ott, Sarah Campbell

1995 Last WBA Championship Game
Chicago 107, St. Louis 96
Co-MVP: Diana Vines & Petra Jackson
