= Women's Basketball Development Association =

US basketball league

- Sport: Basketball
- Founded: 2004
- First season: 2005
- President: William Kelly
- No. of teams: 30
- Country: United States
- Continent: FIBA Americas (Americas)
- Most recent champion: Orlando Boom (2019)
- Most titles: Conyers Conquers, Rock County Robins, and St. Louis Surge (2)
- Website: WBDApro.com

The Women's Basketball Development Association (WBDA) was a professional development female basketball league.

The season typically operated from late April until early August and concluded with a league championship hosted by one of the WBDA's member teams.

== History ==
The Women's Blue Chip Basketball League (WBCBL) was originally founded in November 2004 by Willie McCray Jr, with the assistance of co-founders Cortez Bond and Prentiss Broadway. The WBCBL provided former college players with top rate competition and exposure to professional scouts from around the world. The WBCBL also featured FIBA, former NWBL and WNBA players. The WBCBL was the first national women's development basketball league and the largest nationwide women's basketball league in North America, with a peak of 50 teams.

From 2004 to 2018, the WBCBL created hundreds of jobs across the North America and assisted in filling over 400 professional basketball jobs around the world.

In September 2018, WBCBL founder and president Willie McCray retired and handed off the day-to-day operations to William Kelly. The league was rebranded as the Women's Basketball Development Association (WBDA) and continued as a platform in professional development until 2022.

== Teams ==
WBDA teams
Eastern Conference	City
All Army Team	San Antonio, TX
Atlanta Monarchs	Atlanta, GA
Baltimore Lions	Baltimore, MD
Cleveland Crush	Cleveland, OH
Dade County Lady Bulls	Miami, FL
Detroit Dodgers	Detroit, MI
Fort Myers Bobcats	Fort Myers, FL
Greensboro Havoc	Greensboro, NC
Jacksonville Lady Panthers	Jacksonville, FL
Lake Erie Strive	Irving, NY
New Jersey Sting	Cherry Hill, NJ
Orlando Boom	Orlando, FL
Philadelphia Reign	Philadelphia, PA
Riviera Beach Heatwave	Riviera Beach, FL
Toledo Threat	Toledo, OH
Toronto Lady Elite 1s	Toronto, Ontario
Western Conference	City
AS1 Hoops	San Luis Potosí, México
Birmingham Legends	Birmingham, AL
Chicago Lady Rage	Chicago, IL
Dallas Crest	Dallas, TX
Finesse Flight	Tucson, AZ
Grand Rapids Galaxy	Grand Rapids, MI
Kansas City Royal Heirs	Kansas City, MO
Killeen Force	Killeen, TX
Las Vegas Gems	Las Vegas, NV
Milwaukee Aces	Milwaukee, WI
Oakland Rise	Oakland, CA
Phoenix Lady Elite 1s	Phoenix, AZ
Shreveport-Bossier Lady Knights	Bossier, LA
SoCal Splash	Fullerton, CA
TC Queen Elite	Minneapolis, MN

=== Former teams ===
- Arkansas Ballers
- Arkansas Starz
- Asheville Lady Panthers
- Atlanta Battlecats
- Atlanta Diamond
- Atlanta Flames
- Atlanta J.C. Crew
- Atlanta Riverhawks
- Augusta Blaze
- Baltimore Cougars
- Beaufort Bison
- Brevard Flames
- C-Port Lady Hornets
- Calgary Storm
- Capital City Cougars
- Carolina Lady Rush
- Central VA All-Stars
- Charleston Lowcountry Fire
- Charlotte Heat
- Charlotte Invasion
- Chicago Lady Steam
- Cleveland Crush
- College Park Warriors
- Columbia Reign
- Columbus Hidden Gems
- Columbus Lady Warriors
- Conyers Rockets
- Conway Bearcats
- Dallas Angels
- Dallas Crest
- Dallas Diesel
- Dallas Dolphins
- Dallas Sudden Impact
- DC Blue Stars
- DC Blue Streakz
- Delaware Lady Destroyers
- Delta Storm
- Detroit Black Hawks
- Detroit Dodgers
- Detroit Dolphins
- D.M.V. Bucks
- Douglasville Mustangs
- East Texas Drillers
- Elgin Rim Rockers
- Everett Elite
- EYG Plano Eagles
- Fayetteville Lady Rush
- Fayetteville Lady Xpress
- Flint Flames
- Flint Monarchs
- Florida Lady Knighthawks
- Fort Lauderdale Lions
- Georgia Soul
- Georgia Stampede
- Grand Rapids Galaxy
- Greenville Allstars
- Gulf Coast Storm
- Gulf Coast Tropics
- Gwinnett Starz
- Hudson Valley Queens
- Houston Jaguars
- Houston Sparks
- Huntsville Lady Hornets
- Illinois Shooting Stars
- Illinois Starlights
- Iowa Force
- Jacksonville Beach Panthers
- Jacksonville Cougars
- Jacksonville Reign
- Jacksonville Tigers
- Jersey Fusion
- Johnstown Super Stars
- Kansas City Majestics
- Kansas City Queens
- Kansas Nuggets
- Killeen Force
- Jonesboro Flames
- Las Vegas Gems
- Las Vegas Heat
- Lakewood Lady Panthers
- Lexington Lightning
- Long Island Wave
- Louisiana Bayou Angels
- Louisiana Blaze
- Louisiana All-Stars
- Louisville Fillies
- Maryland Queens
- Mass Marvels
- Memphis Express
- Memphis Hoopsters
- Memphis Lady Blazers
- Memphis Tigers
- M.I. Express
- Miami Rain
- Midwest Flyers
- Minnesota Black Ice
- Mississippi Dream
- Mississippi Rockstars
- Mississippi Storm
- Missouri Arch Angels
- Montgomery Dream
- Music City Icons
- Native Dream
- Nebraska Strikers
- New Orleans Riders
- North Whitehall Lasers
- North Texas Flash
- NYC Exodus
- Oakland-Macomb Run
- Oakland Rise
- Ohio Dynasty
- Oklahoma Flash
- Oklahoma Heat
- Olympia Matrix
- Orange Park Crusaders
- Orlando Extreme
- Orlando Splash
- Orlando Stars
- Out West Elite
- Palm Beach Sabers
- Palm Beach Storm
- Phoenix Lady Elite 1's
- Phoenix Rockets
- Portland Energy
- RDU Sting
- Richmond Flames
- Riviera Beach Heatwave
- Rock County Robins
- San Antonio Crusaders
- San Diego Sol
- San Diego Sprint
- Savannah Warriors
- Seattle Express
- Shreveport Ballers
- Shreveport Sting
- Shreveport Sting
- St. Louis Surge
- SoCal Splash
- South Carolina Legends
- South Carolina
- Tacoma Stars
- Tallahassee Thunder
- Tampa Five Star
- Tampa X-Factor
- Tennessee Trapstars
- Texas Storm
- Toledo Threat
- Toronto Elite 1's
- Toronto Stealth
- Tucson Sol
- USA Elite
- Virginia Lady Stallions
- Virginia Lady Supreme
- Virginia Lady Warriors
- West Coast Lioness
- Winston-Salem Lady Warcats

== Champions ==
Season	WBCBL Champion	Runner-up	Result	Host city
2005	Conyers Conquerors	Dallas Diesel	67-59	Dallas, TX
2006	Conyers Conquerors	Atlanta Flames	57-53	Atlanta, GA
2007	Arkansas Ballers	Shreveport Sting	90-50	Memphis, TN
2008	Tampa X Factor	Savannah Lady Warriors	73-71	Mobile, AL
2009	Savannah Lady Warriors	Chicago Lady Steam	74-72	Tampa, FL
2010	Rock County Robins	Gulf Coast Storm	71-67	Miami Gardens, FL
2011	Rock County Robins	Orlando Extreme	85-73	Atlanta, GA
2012	Louisiana Bayou Angels	St. Louis Surge	90-80	Miami Lakes, FL
2013	Auburn Flyers	Louisiana Bayou Angels	95-73	St. Louis, MO
2014	St. Louis Surge	Auburn Flyers	81-69	New Orleans, LA
2015	Charlotte Invasion	St. Louis Surge	98-86	Greenville, SC
2016	St. Louis Surge	Midwest Flyers	77-62	San Antonio, Texas
2017	Georgia Soul	St. Louis Surge	64-63	St. Louis, MO
2018	Atlanta Monarchs	St. Louis Surge	80-79	Charlotte, NC
Season	WBDA Champion	Runner-up	Result	Host city
2019	Orlando Boom	Phoenix Lady Elite 1's	87-82	Kansas City, MO
2020	Not held due to COVID-19			
2021	Southwest Desert Lynx	Denver Dynasty	65-57	Duncanville, Texas
2022	Orlando Boom	Maryland Jewels	72-56	

== WBCBL Professional Basketball Trailblazer Award ==
In honor of the Women's Blue Chip Basketball League's 10th anniversary, the 2015 Women's Professional Basketball "Trailblazer" Award was given on August 2, 2015, to ten female basketball icons, including Cynthia Cooper, Nancy Lieberman, Sarah Campbell, Dr. Robelyn Garcia, Lynette Woodard, Kandi Conda, Lisa Leslie, E.C. Hill, Dr. Geri Kay Hart and Tamika Catchings. The award recognizes some of the most influential people in professional women's basketball, specifically those who helped blaze the trail, shape the overall landscape and pave the way for women's professional basketball.
