= List of evangelical seminaries and theological colleges =

This is a list of evangelical Christian seminaries, bible colleges, and other theological institutions.

== 100% online, non-residential ==
- International College for Christian Studies (Texas, US)
- RTM Academy

== Oceania ==
=== Australia ===
- Adelaide College of Divinity (Adelaide, South Australia and Gold Coast, Queensland)
- Adelaide College of Ministries (Adelaide, South Australia)
- Alliance College of Australia (Canberra)
- Alphacrucis College (Parramatta, New South Wales)
- Bible College of South Australia (Adelaide, South Australia)
- Brisbane School of Theology (Brisbane, Queensland)
- Christ College (Sydney, New South Wales)
- Stirling Theological College (Melbourne and National) (Melbourne, Victoria)
- Emmaus Bible College (Sydney, New South Wales)
- Hillsong International Leadership College (Sydney, New South Wales)
- Internet Bible College (Sydney, New South Wales)
- Kingsley College, Melbourne (Melbourne, Victoria)
- Melbourne School of Theology (Melbourne, Victoria)
- Moore Theological College (Sydney, New South Wales)
- Morling Baptist Theological and Bible College (Sydney, New South Wales)
- Perth Bible College (Perth, Western Australia)
- Presbyterian Theological College (Melbourne, Victoria)
- Queensland Theological College (Brisbane, Queensland)
- Reformed Theological College (Geelong, Victoria)
- Ridley Melbourne - Mission & Ministry College (Melbourne, Victoria)
- St Mark's National Theological Centre (Canberra, ACT)
- Sydney Missionary and Bible College (Sydney, New South Wales)
- Tabor College Australia (Adelaide, Hobart, Melbourne, Perth and Sydney)
- Trinity Theological College, Perth (Perth, Western Australia)
- Vision International College (Minto, New South Wales)
- Vose Seminary (Bentley, Western Australia)
- Wesley Institute (Sydney, New South Wales)

=== New Zealand ===
- Carey Baptist College (Auckland, New Zealand, Online Distance Learning)
- Laidlaw College (formerly Bible College of New Zealand: Auckland, Christchurch, CDL, New Zealand)

=== Other Oceania ===
- Christian Leaders Training College (Banz, Port Moresby and Lae, Papua New Guinea)
- Pacific Islands Bible College (Guam, Tol, Chuuk, Palau and Yap, Federated States of Micronesia)
- Takamoa Theological College, Cook Islands

== North America ==
=== Canada ===
- Acadia Divinity College (Wolfville, Nova Scotia)
- Alberta Bible College (Calgary, Alberta)
- Associated Canadian Theological Schools (Langley, British Columbia)
- Briercrest College and Seminary (Caronport, Saskatchewan)
- Canada Christian College (Whitby, Ontario)
- Canadian Baptist Bible College (Winkler, Manitoba)
- Canadian Baptist Seminary (Langley, British Columbia)
- Canadian Reformed Theological Seminary (Hamilton, Ontario)
- Canadian Baptist Theological Seminary and College (Cochrane, Alberta)
- Carey Theological College (Vancouver, British Columbia)
- Columbia Bible College (Abbotsford, British Columbia)
- Concordia Lutheran Theological Seminary (St. Catharines, Ontario)
- Eston College (Regina, Saskatchewan)
- Emmanuel Bible College (Kitchener, Ontario)
- Farel Reformed Theological Seminary (Montreal, Quebec)
- Heritage College & Seminary (Cambridge, Ontario)
- Horizon College and Seminary (Saskatoon, Saskatchewan)
- Kingswood University (Sussex, New Brunswick)
- Master's College and Seminary (Peterborough, Ontario)
- McMaster Divinity College (Hamilton, Ontario)
- Mennonite Brethren Biblical Seminary Canada (Langley, British Columbia)
- Millar College of the Bible (Pambrun, Saskatchewan)
- New Brunswick Bible Institute (Victoria Corner, New Brunswick)
- Northwest Baptist Seminary (Langley, British Columbia)
- Peace River Bible Institute (Sexsmith, Alberta)
- Prairie College (Three Hills, Alberta)
- Providence College and Theological Seminary (Otterburne, Manitoba)
- Regent College (Vancouver, British Columbia)
- Rocky Mountain College, Calgary (Calgary, Alberta)
- Summit Pacific College (Abbotsford, British Columbia)
- Taylor College and Seminary (Edmonton, Alberta)
- Toronto Baptist Seminary (Toronto, Ontario)
- Tyndale University College and Seminary (Toronto, Ontario)
- Vanguard College (Edmonton, Alberta)
- Wycliffe College (Toronto, Ontario)

=== United States ===
Many of the seminaries listed in this section are affiliated with or have students and faculty from more than one denomination or tradition. The seminaries are listed under the denomination with which they are predominantly associated if there is one.

==== Adventist ====
- Andrews University (Michigan)
- Southern Adventist University (Tennessee)
- La Sierra University, H.M.S. Richards Divinity School (California)
- Loma Linda University School of Religion (California)

==== Baptist ====
- Arlington Baptist University (Texas)
- American Baptist Seminary of the West (California)
- Baptist Bible College & Seminary (Pennsylvania)
- Baptist Missionary Association Theological Seminary (Texas)
- Baptist Theological Seminary at Richmond
- Bethel Seminary (Minnesota)
- Campbell University Divinity School (North Carolina)
- Central Baptist Theological Seminary of Kansas City (Kansas)
- Central Baptist Theological Seminary of Minneapolis (Minnesota)
- Clear Creek Baptist Bible College (Kentucky)
- Criswell College (Texas)
- Cross Theological Seminary (Arkansas)
- Detroit Baptist Theological Seminary (Michigan)
- Faith Baptist Bible College and Theological Seminary (Iowa)
- Gateway Seminary, formerly known as Golden Gate Baptist Theological Seminary (California)
- George W. Truett Theological Seminary (Texas)
- Grace Evangelical Seminary (Maine)
- Immanuel Baptist Theological Seminary (Georgia)
- James and Carolyn McAfee School of Theology (Georgia)
- John Leland Center for Theological Studies (Virginia)
- Liberty Baptist Theological Seminary (Virginia)
- Louisiana Baptist University (Louisiana)
- Mid-America Baptist Theological Seminary (Tennessee)
- Midwestern Baptist Theological Seminary (Missouri)
- Mission University (Missouri)
- New Orleans Baptist Theological Seminary (Louisiana)
- Northern Seminary (Illinois)
- Palmer Theological Seminary (Pennsylvania)
- Salt Lake Baptist College (Utah)
- Sioux Falls Seminary (South Dakota)
- Southeastern Baptist Theological Seminary (North Carolina)
- Southeastern Free Will Baptist College (North Carolina)
- Southern Baptist Theological Seminary (Kentucky)
- Southwestern Baptist Theological Seminary (Texas)
- Stark College and Seminary (Texas)
- Temple Baptist Seminary (Tennessee)
- Texas Baptist Institute & Seminary (Texas)
- Virginia Beach Theological Seminary (Virginia)
- Wayland Baptist Theological Seminary
- Welch College (Tennessee)

==== Brethren ====
- Ashland Theological Seminary (Ohio)
- Bethany Theological Seminary (Indiana)

==== Christian Church (Disciples of Christ) ====
- Christian Theological Seminary (Indiana)
- Brite Divinity School (Texas)
- Lexington Theological Seminary (Kentucky)
- Phillips Theological Seminary (Oklahoma)

Christian Churches/Churches of Christ (Independent)

- Carolina Christian College (North Carolina)
- Emmanuel Christian Seminary (Tennessee)
- Ozark Christian College (Missouri)
- Central Bible University (Missouri)

==== Christian and Missionary Alliance ====
- A.W. Tozer Theological Seminary (California)
- Alliance Theological Seminary (New York)
- Bethel College (Indiana)

==== Churches of Christ ====
- Abilene Christian University Graduate School of Theology (Texas)
- Amridge University Turner School of Theology (Alabama)
- Austin Graduate School of Theology (Texas)
- Harding School of Theology (Tennessee)
- Oklahoma Christian University Graduate School of Theology (Oklahoma)

==== Episcopal ====
- Berkeley Divinity School at Yale (Connecticut) Mid-way between evangelical and Anglo-Catholic
- Bexley Hall (Ohio) Was mid-way between evangelical and Anglo-Catholic
- Bexley Seabury Federation of Bexley Hall and Seabury-Western; offers hybrid program, based on second floor of Chicago Theological Seminary
- Bishop Payne Divinity School (Virginia) Defunct
- The Church Divinity School of the Pacific (California) Mid-way between evangelical and Anglo-Catholic, liberal
- Cranmer Theological House (Texas)
- Cummins Memorial Theological Seminary (South Carolina)
- Episcopal Theological Seminary of the Southwest (Texas) Mid-way between evangelical and Anglo-Catholic
- General Theological Seminary (GTS) (New York) Mid-way between evangelical and Anglo-Catholic but tendency toward Anglo-Catholic liturgically
- Nashotah House (Wisconsin) Anglo-Catholic, conservative
- Reformed Episcopal Seminary (Pennsylvania)
- School of Theology at The University of the South (Tennessee) Mid-way between evangelical and Anglo-Catholic
- Seabury-Western Theological Seminary (Illinois) Was mid-way but similar to GTS, since liturgical tendency is Anglo-Catholic
- Trinity Anglican Seminary (Pennsylvania)
- Virginia Theological Seminary (VTS) (Virginia) Evangelical-leaning

==== Evangelical Covenant ====
- North Park Theological Seminary (Illinois)

==== Evangelical Free ====
- Trinity Evangelical Divinity School (Illinois)

==== Grace Brethren ====
- Grace Theological Seminary (Indiana)

==== Religious Society of Friends (Quakers) ====
- Earlham School of Religion (Indiana)

==== Lutheran ====
- Association Free Lutheran Theological Seminary (Minnesota)
- Bethany Lutheran Theological Seminary (Minnesota)
- Concordia Seminary (Missouri)
- Concordia Theological Seminary (Indiana)
- Faith International University & Seminary (Washington)
- Luther Seminary (Minnesota)
- Lutheran Brethren Seminary (Minnesota)
- Lutheran School of Theology at Chicago (Illinois)
- Lutheran Theological Seminary at Gettysburg (Pennsylvania)
- Lutheran Theological Seminary at Philadelphia (Pennsylvania)
- Lutheran Theological Southern Seminary (South Carolina)
- Pacific Lutheran Theological Seminary (California)
- Trinity Lutheran Seminary (Ohio)
- Wartburg Theological Seminary (Iowa)
- Wisconsin Lutheran Seminary (Wisconsin)

==== Mennonite ====
- Anabaptist Mennonite Biblical Seminary (Indiana)
- Eastern Mennonite Seminary (Virginia)

==== Mennonite Brethren ====
- Fresno Pacific University Biblical Seminary (California )

==== Methodist ====
- Asbury Theological Seminary (Kentucky and Florida)
- Allegheny Wesleyan College (Ohio)
- Anderson School of Theology (Indiana)
- Bible Missionary Institute (Illinois)
- Boulden Seminary (Delaware)
- Breckbill Bible College (Virginia)
- Evangelical Theological Seminary (Pennsylvania)
- Evangelical Wesleyan Bible Institute (Pennsylvania)
- Faith Bible School (South Dakota)
- Gammon Theological Seminary (Georgia)
- God's Bible School (Ohio)
- Hobe Sound Bible College (Florida)
- Hood Theological Seminary (North Carolina)
- Houghton University (New York)
- Kansas Christian College
- Kentucky Mountain Bible College (Kentucky)
- Nazarene Bible College (Colorado)
- Nazarene Theological Seminary (Missouri)
- Northeastern Seminary (New York)
- Northwest Indian Bible Institute (Montana)
- Ohio Christian University (Ohio)
- Oklahoma Wesleyan University (Oklahoma)
- Penn View Bible Institute (Pennsylvania)
- Seattle Pacific University (Washington)
- Southern Methodist College (South Carolina)
- Southern Wesleyan University (South Carolina)
- United Theological Seminary (Ohio/West Virginia)
- Wesley Biblical Seminary (Mississippi)
- Wesley Seminary (Indiana)
- Wesleyan Holiness Bible College/West Virginia Training School (West Virginia)

==== Moravian ====
- Moravian Theological Seminary (Bethlehem, Pennsylvania)

==== Non-denominational and multi-denominational ====
- Andersonville Theological Seminary (Georgia)
- Appalachian Bible College (West Virginia)
- Beeson Divinity School (Alabama)
- Bethlehem College and Seminary (Minnesota)
- Bible College - Christ For The Nations Institute (Dallas, Texas)
- The Bible Seminary (Texas)
- Biblical Theological Seminary (Pennsylvania)
- Blue Ridge Institute for Theological Education (Roanoke, Virginia)
- Brookes Bible College (St. Louis, Missouri)
- Calvary Bible College (Kansas City, Missouri)
- Calvary Theological Seminary (Kansas City, Missouri)
- Capital Bible Seminary (Pennsylvania)
- Carolina Graduate School of Divinity (Greensboro, North Carolina) Defunct as of 2016
- Charlotte Christian College and Theological Seminary (Charlotte, North Carolina)
- Christ for the Nations Institute Dallas (Dallas, Texas)
- Cincinnati Bible Seminary (Ohio)
- Clearwater Christian College (Florida)
- Cornerstone College & Seminary (Virginia)
- Cornerstone Theological Seminary (formerly Grand Rapids Theological Seminary) (Michigan)
- The Cornerstone Seminary (California)
- Covenant Bible Seminary (Lakewood, Washington)
- Dallas Theological Seminary (Texas, Georgia, Florida)
- Denver Seminary (Colorado)
- Emmaus University (Iowa)
- The Expositors Seminary (Multiple Church-Based)
- Evangel Theological Seminary (Harrisonburg, Virginia) ETS
- Evangelical Seminary of Puerto Rico (Puerto Rico)
- Faith Bible Seminary (Indiana)
- Fuller Theological Seminary (California, Arizona, Washington, Colorado, Texas)
- Gordon College (Wenham, Massachusetts)
- Gordon-Conwell Theological Seminary (Massachusetts; North Carolina, Florida)
- Grace Communion Seminary (Charlotte, North Carolina)
- Grace School of Theology (The Woodlands, Texas)
- Grace Theological Seminary (Indiana)
- International Bible College (Texas)
- The Interdenominational Theological Center (Georgia)
- International College for Christian Studies (Texas)
- International Theological Seminary (California)
- Jacksonville Theological Seminary
- Kingsway University and Theological Seminary (Iowa)
- Master's College (California)
- The Master's Seminary (California)
- Moody Bible Institute (Illinois)
- Multnomah Biblical Seminary (Oregon)
- New College Berkeley (California)
- Oral Roberts University College of Theology and Ministry
- Palm Beach Atlantic University (Florida)
- Phoenix Seminary (Arizona)
- Portland Seminary (Oregon)
- Redemption Seminary (Online; Arizona)
- Salt Lake Bible College (Utah)
- Shepherds Theological Seminary (North Carolina)
- Southern California Seminary (California)
- Southern Evangelical Seminary (North Carolina)
- Talbot School of Theology (California)
- Tyndale Theological Seminary (Louisiana; Texas)
- United States Seminary for Theological Studies (California)
- Urbana Theological Seminary (Illinois)
- Vanderbilt University Divinity School (Tennessee)
- Vanguard University of Southern California (California)
- Veritas International University (Santa Ana, California)
- The WEST Institute (Wyoming)
- Western Seminary (Oregon; California)
- Westmont College (California)
- Wheaton College (Illinois)

==== Holiness Pentecotal ====
- Charles H. Mason Theological Seminary (Georgia)
- Church of God School of Ministry (Tennessee)
- Free Gospel Bible Institute (Pennsylvania)
- Heritage Bible College (North Carolina)
- Lee University (Tennessee)
- Pentecostal Theological Seminary (Tennessee)
- Southwestern Christian University (Oklahoma)

==== Finished Work Pentecostal and Charismatic ====
- Assemblies of God Theological Seminary (Missouri)
- Evangel University (Missouri)
- Northpoint Bible College (Massachusetts)
- Oral Roberts University School of Theology (Oklahoma)
- Pentecostal Theological Seminary (Tennessee)
- Regent University School of Divinity (Virginia)
- Nelson University (Texas)
- North Central University (Minnesota)
- Southeastern University (Florida)
- Texas University of Theology (Texas)
- The King's College and Seminary (California)
- Trinity Bible College and Graduate School (North Dakota)
- Vision International University (California)

==== Quaker ====
- Earlham College (Indiana)
- Earlham School of Religion (Indiana)
- Friends University (Kansas)
- George Fox University (Oregon)
- Malone University (Ohio)
- Union Bible College and Seminary (Indiana)
- Wilmington College (Ohio)

==== Presbyterian and Reformed ====
- Austin Presbyterian Theological Seminary (Texas)
- Calvin Theological Seminary (Michigan)
- Canadian Reformed Theological Seminary (Hamilton, Ontario)
- Chesapeake Reformed Theological Seminary (Maryland)
- City Seminary of Sacramento (California)
- Columbia Theological Seminary (Georgia)
- Covenant Theological Seminary (Missouri)
- Dordt Theological Seminary (Minnesota)
- Eden Theological Seminary (Missouri)
- Erskine Theological Seminary (South Carolina)
- Faith Theological Seminary (Maryland)
- Geneva Reformed Seminary (South Carolina)
- Greenville Presbyterian Theological Seminary (South Carolina)
- Heidelberg Theological Seminary (South Dakota)
- International Theological Seminary (California)
- International Reformed Seminary (California)
- Knox Theological Seminary (Florida)
- Louisville Presbyterian Theological Seminary (Kentucky)
- Memphis Theological Seminary (Tennessee)
- Mid-America Reformed Seminary (Indiana)
- MINTS International Seminary (Florida; worldwide) [It has no academic accreditation]
- New Brunswick Theological Seminary (New Jersey)
- New Geneva Academy (Indiana)
- New Geneva Theological Seminary (Colorado; Virginia)
- Northwest Theological Seminary (Washington)
- Pittsburgh Theological Seminary (Pennsylvania)
- Puritan Reformed Theological Seminary (Michigan)
- Princeton Theological Seminary (New Jersey)
- Presbyterian Theological Seminary (California)
- Redeemer Theological Seminary (Texas)
- Reformation International Theological Seminary (Florida and worldwide)
- Reformed Presbyterian Theological Seminary (Pennsylvania)
- Reformed Theological Seminary (Florida; Georgia; Mississippi; North Carolina; New York; Texas; District of Columbia)
- San Francisco Theological Seminary (California)
- Southern Reformed Seminary (Texas)
- Western Reformed Seminary (Washington)
- Western Theological Seminary (Michigan)
- Westminster Seminary California (California)
- Westminster Theological Seminary (Pennsylvania)
- Whitefield Theological Seminary (Florida)

== Europe ==
=== Germany ===
- Akademie für Weltmission (Korntal, Germany)
- Augustana Divinity School, Lutheran (Neuendettelsau, Bavaria)
- Bibel- und Missionsschule Ostfriesland (Ostermoordorf)
- Bibelschule Brake (Lemgo)
- Bibelseminar Bonn (Bornheim)
- Biblisch-Theologische Akademie Wiedenest (Bergneustadt)
- EUSEBIA School of Theology (ESTh) (Stuttgart)
- European Nazarene College
- European Theological Seminary (Freudenstadt)
- Evangelische Hochschule Tabor, Marburg (Marburg)
- Freie Theologische Hochschule Gießen (Gießen)
- Gemeindeakademie (Gelnhausen)
- Institut für Gemeindebau und Weltmission Deutschland (IGW) (Essen)
- Internationale Hochschule Liebenzell, IHL (Bad Liebenzell)
- Lutherische Theologische Hochschule, SELK, Oberursel/Frankfurt am Main
- Marburger Bibelseminar (Marburg)
- Martin Bucer Seminary: Martin Bucer European Theological Seminary and Research Institutes (Bonn)
- School of Christ Deutschland
- Reformatorisch-Theologisches Seminar Heidelberg, Reformed (Heidelberg)
- Theologische Hochschule Elstal (Wustermark bei Berlin)
- Theologische Hochschule Ewersbach (Dietzhölztal)
- Theologisches Seminar Adelshofen (Eppingen)
- Theologisches Seminar Beröa (Erzhausen)
- Theologisches Seminar Rheinland (Wölmersen)
- Werkstatt für Gemeindeaufbau (Ditzingen)

=== Poland ===
==== Adventist ====
- The Polish College of Theology and Humanities in Podkowa Leśna (Podkowa Leśna, Poland)

==== Baptist ====
- Warsaw Baptist Theological Seminary (Warsaw, Poland)

==== Methodist ====
- Jan Laski Methodist Theological Seminary in Warsaw (Warsaw, Poland)

==== Non-denominational and multi-denominational ====
- Evangelical School of Theology in Wroclaw (Wroclaw, Poland)

==== Pentecostal ====
- Higher School of Theology and Social in Warsaw (Warsaw, Poland)

=== Switzerland ===
- Bibelschule Widibühl
- EBTC Zurich
- Haute École de Théologie, St. Legier
- Institut für Gemeindebau und Weltmission (IGW)
- International Seminary of Theology and Leadership
- Martin Bucer Seminar
- Mennonitisches und Täuferisches Bildungszentrum Bienenberg, Liestal
- Seminar für biblische Theologie Beatenberg
- Staatsunabhängigen Theologischen Hochschule Basel
- Theologische Seminar St. Chrischona

=== United Kingdom ===
As of 2024, the Church Times reported that there are "about 30 Bible colleges in the UK, in addition to the Church of England's theological educational institutions", but that factors including financial pressures, difficulty recruiting students, and problems finding universities to validate their qualifications could lead to "mergers and closures", and that one college principal believes the sector is "at crisis point".

- All Nations Christian College (Hertfordshire, England)
- Belfast Bible College (Belfast, Northern Ireland)
- Birmingham Christian College
- Carmel Bible College (Bristol, England)
- Christ the Redeemer Bible College (London, England)
- Cliff College (Calver, England)
- Cranmer Hall, Durham University (Durham, England)
- Crosslands Seminary (Sheffield, England)
- Edinburgh Theological Seminary (Edinburgh, Scotland)
- Irish Baptist College (Lisburn, Northern Ireland)
- Faith Mission Bible College (Edinburgh, Scotland)
- ForMission College (London, Birmingham, Manchester, Intensive Hubs)
- King's Evangelical Divinity School (Broadstairs, Kent)
- London School of Theology (London, England)
- London Theological Seminary (London, England)
- Moorlands College (Christchurch, England)
- Nazarene Theological College (Manchester, England)
- Oak Hill Theological College (London, England)
- Oxford Centre for Mission Studies (Oxford, England)
- Redcliffe College (Gloucester, England)
- Regents Theological College (Worcestershire, England)
- Ridley Hall, Cambridge (Cambridge, England)
- School of Christ International Europe, UK, Northern Ireland,
- South London Christian College (London, England)
- South Wales Baptist College (Cardiff, Wales)
- Spurgeon's College (London, England)
- St John's College, Nottingham (Nottingham, England)
- St Padarn's Institute (Cardiff, Wales)
- Tilsley College, GLO EUROPE Mission, Motherwell (Motherwell, Scotland)
- Trinity College, Bristol (Bristol, England)
- Union School of Theology (Bridgend, Wales)
- Union Theological College (Belfast, Northern Ireland)
- Wales Evangelical School of Theology (Bridgend, Wales)
- Westcott House (Cambridge, England)
- Westminster Presbyterian Theological Seminary (Newcastle upon Tyne, England)
- Westminster Theological Centre (Multiple Locations, England, Channel Islands, Stockholm)
- Whitefield College of the Bible (Banbridge, Northern Ireland)
- Wycliffe Hall Oxford (Oxford, England)

=== Nordic countries ===
- Norwegian School of Leadership and Theology, Pentecostal and Baptist (Oslo, Norway)
- Fjellhaug International University College (Oslo, Norway)
- Johannelund Theological Seminary (Uppsala, Sweden)
- MF Norwegian School of Theology, Lutheran (Oslo, Norway)
- VID Specialized University, formerly the School of Mission and Theology (Stavanger, Norway)
- Iso Kirja Bible College (Keuruu, Finland)
- Suomen Teologinen Opisto (Hanko, Finland)

=== Other European countries ===
- Bucharest Baptist Theological Institute (Bucharest, Romania)
- Continental Theological Seminary, CTS (Sint-Pieters-Leeuw, Belgium)
- Cornerstone Bible College for Mission Training (Beugen, Netherlands)
- Eurasian Theological Seminary (Moscow, Russia)
- Evangel Theological Seminary (now Evangel Theological University), (Kyiv, Ukraine)
- Evangelical Theological Faculty, ETF (Leuven, Belgium)
- Evangelical Theological Seminary (Osijek, Croatia)
- Faculté Libre de Théologie Evangélique, FLTE (Vaux-sur-Seine, France)
- Institut Biblique de Nogent-sur-Marne, IBN, (Nogent-sur-Marne, France)
- Institut de Théologie Protestante et Evangélique, FJC Faculté Jean-Calvin (Aix-en-Provence, France)
- PSALT COLLEGE, Bachelor en théologie, ministère interculturel, louange et arts, enregistré à l'académie de Paris PSALT COLLEGE (Paris, France)
- Institut für Gemeindebau und Weltmission International (IGW) (Zürich, Switzerland)
- Irish Bible Institute (Dublin, Ireland)
- Monte Esperança Instituto Bíblico (Lisbon, Portugal)
- Novi Sad Theological College (Novi Sad, Serbia)
- Protestant Theological Seminary, PTS (Novi Sad, Serbia)
- School of Christ International - Europe, UK, Ireland, Sweden, Germany, France, Norway, Germany etc.
- Staatsunabhängige Theologische Hochschule Basel (Basel, Switzerland); (German Wikipedia article here)
- Theological Biblical Academy (Krapina, Croatia)
- Theological Institute of Nîmes (Montpellier, France)
- Theologisches Seminar St. Chrischona (tsc) (Basel, Switzerland)
- Trinity Video Seminary (Russia, Ukraine, Cyprus)
- Tyndale Theological Seminary (Badhoevedorp, The Netherlands)

== Africa ==
- African Bible College University (Yekepa, Liberia)
- African Christian University (Lusaka, Zambia)
- Africa Nazarene University (Nairobi, Kenya)
- Africa Reformation Theological Seminary (ARTS) (Kampala, Uganda)
- African Bible College (Malawi)
- African Bible University (Kampala, Uganda)
- African Christian Theological Seminary (Monrovia, Liberia)
- Auckland Park Theological Seminary (Johannesburg, South Africa)
- Baptist College of Theology Jos Plateau State Nigeria
- Bible Institute of South Africa (Cape Town, South Africa)
- Bishop Tucker School of Theology and Divinity (Mukono, Uganda)
- Bunia Theological Seminary (Shalom University) (DR Congo)
- Cape Town Baptist Seminary (Cape Town, South Africa)
- Central Africa Baptist University (CABU) (Kitwe, Zambia)
- Christ For Africa University (CFAU) (Douala, Cameroon)
- Christ Apostolic Church Theological Seminary (CACTS, ILE -IFE) Osun, Nigeria
- Ethan College Of Biblical Studies, Akure, Nigeria
- Hugh Goldie Theological Institution, Arochukwu, Abia State, Nigeria (Presbyterian)
- Onderma University Seminary, Ututu, Nigeria (Online only)
- East Africa School of Theology (EAST) (Nairobi, Kenya)
- ECWA Theological Seminary, Igbaja, Kwara State, Nigeria
- ECWA Theological Seminary (Kagoro, Kaduna State, Nigeria)
- Essien Ukpabio Presbyterian Theological College (Itu, Akwa Ibom State, Nigeria)
- Ethiopian Graduate School of Theology (EGST) (Addis Ababa, Ethiopia)
- Evangel Theological Seminary (ETS) (Jos, Nigeria)
- Evangelical Theological College (ETC) (Addis Ababa, Ethiopia)
- [Evangelical Seminary of West Africa] ESWA (Monrovia, Liberia, West Africa)
- Ezekiel College of Theology (Church of Nigeria) (Ekpoma, Edo State, Nigeria)
- George Whitefield College (Cape Town, South Africa)
- Esien Ukpabio Presbyterian Theological Seminary (Itu, Akwa Ibom, Nigeria)
- Instituto Bíblico "Casa de la Palabra" (IBCP) (Bata & Malabo, Equatorial Guinea)
- Jos ECWA Theological Seminary (JETS) (Jos, Nigeria)
- Leaders Bible Institute (LBI) (Abuja, Nigeria)
- Kingdom Global College and Seminary (Addis Ababa, Ethiopia)
- Nairobi International School of Theology (NIST) (Nairobi, Kenya)
- Nazarene Theological College (Honeydew, South Africa)
- Pentecostal Theological College Uganda (Mbale, Uganda)
- Presbyterian Theological Seminary (Kumba, Cameroon)
- Redeemed Christian Bible College (Ogun State, Nigeria)
- Scott Theological College (Machakos, Kenya)
- South African Theological Seminary (Johannesburg, South Africa)
- The Nigerian Baptist Theological Seminary (NBTS) (Ogbomoso, Nigeria)
- Theological College of Central Africa (TCCA) (Ndola, Zambia)
- Theological College of Northern Nigeria (TCNN) (Jos, Nigeria)
- Uganda Baptist Seminary (UBS) (Jinja, Uganda)
- Uganda Bible Institute (UBI) (Mbarara, Uganda)
- Uganda Martyrs Seminary Namugongo
- Valley View University (Oyibi, Ghana)
- West Africa Theological Seminary WATS (Lagos, Nigeria)
- Westminster Christian Institute Uganda (WCIU) (Kampala, Uganda)

== Middle East ==
- Bethlehem Bible College (BBC) (Bethlehem, Palestine)
- Biblical Theological Seminary of Jordan, (Amman, Jordan)
- Jordan Evangelical Theological Seminary (Amman, Jordan)
- Nazareth Evangelical College, (Nazareth, Israel)

== Asia ==
=== East Asia ===
==== Hong Kong ====
- Alliance Bible Seminary (ABS) (Hong Kong)
- Asian Lutheran Seminary (ALS) (Hong Kong)
- Asian Missionary Association Seminary (AMAS) (Hong Kong)
- Bethel Bible Seminary (Hong Kong)
- Bible Seminary of Hong Kong (BSHK) (Hong Kong)
- China Baptist Theological College (CBTC) (Hong Kong)
- China Bible Seminary (CBS) (Hong Kong)
- China Graduate School of Theology (CGST) (Hong Kong)
- Chinese Mission Seminary (CMS) (Hong Kong)
- Christian Ministry Institute (CMI) (Hong Kong)
- Concordia Theological Seminary (CTS) (Hong Kong)
- Divinity School of Chung Chi College, The Chinese University of Hong Kong (Hong Kong)
- Evangel Seminary (Hong Kong)
- Institute of Christian Ministry-Chinese YMCA of Hong Kong (ICM) (Hong Kong)
- Hong Kong Baptist Theological Seminary (HKBTS) (Hong Kong)
- HKSKH Ming Hua Theological College (Hong Kong)
- Lutheran Theological Seminary (Hong Kong) (LTS) (Hong Kong)
- United Wesleyan Graduate Institute (UWGI) (Hong Kong)
- Yan Fook Theological Seminary (YFTS) (Hong Kong)

==== Japan ====
- Central Bible College (Tokyo, Japan)
- Japan Bible Seminary (JBS) (Tokyo, Japan)
- Kobe Lutheran Theological Seminary (Kobe, Japan)
- Tokyo Biblical Seminary (TBS) (Tokyo, Japan)
- Tokyo Christian University (TCU) (Tokyo, Japan)

==== Mongolia ====
- Union Bible Theological College, Библийн Сургалтын Төв (Ulaanbaatar, Mongolia)

==== South Korea ====
- Asia Center for Theological Studies and Missions (Seoul, South Korea)
- ChongShin University and Theological Seminary (Seoul, South Korea)
- Hapdong Presbyterian Theological Seminary (Seoul, South Korea)
- Hyupsung Graduate School of Theology (Hwa Seong City, South Korea)
- Korea Presbyterian Theological Seminary (KPTS) (Seoul, South Korea)
- Koryo Theological Seminary (Paju, South Korea)
- Methodist Theological Seminary (Seoul, South Korea)
- Mokwon Graduate school of Theology (Daejeon, South Korea)
- Presbyterian University and Theological Seminary (Seoul, South Korea)
- Seoul Theological University (Bucheon, South Korea)
- Torch Trinity Graduate University (Seoul, South Korea)

==== Taiwan ====
- Central Taiwan Theological Seminary (CTTS) (Taichung, Taiwan)
- China Evangelical Seminary (CES) (Taipei, Taiwan)
- China Lutheran Seminary (CLS) (Hsinchu, Taiwan)
- China Reformed Theological Seminary (CRTS) (Taipei, Taiwan)
- Christ's Disciples Training Seminary (CDTS) (Keelung, Taiwan)
- Christian Hakka Mission Theological Seminary (HMS) (Taoyuan, Taiwan)
- Holy Light Theological Seminary (Kaohsiung, Taiwan)
- Logos Evangelical Seminary in Taiwan (New Taipei, Taiwan)
- Logos Theological Seminary (Kaohsiung, Taiwan)
- Northern China Theological Seminary (Taipei, Taiwan)
- Tao-Sheng Theological Seminary (Taipei, Taiwan)
- The Methodist Graduate School of Theology (MGST) (Taipei, Taiwan)
- Taiwan Baptist Theological Seminary (Taipei, Taiwan)
- Taiwan Conservative Baptist Seminary (Yunlin, Taiwan)
- Yu-Shan Theological College and Seminary (Hualien County, Taiwan)

=== Southeast Asia ===
==== Indonesia ====
- Jakarta Theological Seminary (Jakarta)
- Institut Injil Indonesia (Batu, East Java)
- Southeast Asia Bible Seminary (Malang, East Java)
- Sekolah Tinggi Teologi Amanat Agung (West Jakarta)
- Sekolah Tinggi Teologi Bethel Pekanbaru (Pekanbaru, Riau)
- Sekolah Tinggi Teologi Cipanas (Cipanas, Cianjur)
- Sekolah Tinggi Teologi HKBP Pematangsiantar (Pematangsiantar, North Sumatra)
- Sekolah Tinggi Teologi Moriah (Tangerang, Banten)
- Sekolah Tinggi Teologi Palembang (Palembang, South Sumatra)
- Sekolah Tinggi Teologi Reformed Indonesia (South Jakarta)
- Sekolah Tinggi Teologi Sabaidah Siborongborong (Tapanuli Utara, North Sumatra)
- Sekolah Tinggi Teologi Satyabhakti (Malang, East Java)
- Sekolah Tinggi Teologi Tenggarong (Kutai Kartanegara, East Kalimantan)
- Sekolah Tinggi Theologia Abdiel (Ungaran, Central Java)
- Sekolah Tinggi Theologia Baptis Indonesia (Semarang, Central Java)

==== Malaysia ====
- Alpha Omega International College (Selangor, Malaysia)
- Bible College of Malaysia (Selangor, Malaysia)
- Malaysia Baptist Theological Seminary (Penang, Malaysia)
- Malaysia Bible Seminary (Selangor, Malaysia)
- Sabah Theological Seminary (Sabah, Malaysia)
- Seminari Theoloji Malaysia (Negeri Sembilan, Malaysia)

==== Myanmar ====
- Kachin Theological College (Nawng Nang, Myanmar)
- Karen Baptist Theological Seminary (Yangoon, Burma)
- Myanmar Institute of Theology (Rangoon, Myanmar)
- Zomi Theological College (Falam, Myanmar)
- Southeast Asia Bible College

==== Philippines ====
- Alliance Graduate School (AGS, formerly Alliance Biblical Seminary) (Quezon City, Philippines)
- Asia Biblical Theological Seminary (Manila, Baguio City, and Cagayan de Oro, Philippines)
- Asia-Pacific Nazarene Theological Seminary (Rizal, Philippines)
- Asian Theological Seminary (Quezon City, Philippines)
- PTS College and Advanced Studies (formerly Presbyterian Theological Seminary) (Dasmarinas City, Philippines)
- Asian Seminary of Christian Ministries (Makati City, Philippines)
- Biblical Seminary of the Philippines (Valenzuela City)
- FEBIAS College of Bible (Valenzuela City, Metro Manila, Philippines)
- International Graduate School of Leadership (IGSL, formerly International School of Theology) (Quezon City, Philippines)

==== Singapore ====
- Asia Biblical Theological Seminary
- Asia Pacific Institute for Theological Research (APITR)
- Baptist Theological Seminary
- Biblical Graduate School of Theology (BGST)
- East Asia School of Theology (EAST)
- Far Eastern Bible College (FEBC)
- Singapore Bible College
- TCA College
- Trinity Theological College

==== Thailand ====
- McGilvary College of Divinity of Payap University (Chiang Mai, Thailand)
- Asia Biblical Theological Seminary (multiple locations; office in Chiang Mai, Thailand)

==== Vietnam ====
List of Theological Seminaries in Vietnam
No.	Religious Organization	Name of Theological Seminary	Notes
1	Evangelical Church of Vietnam (South)	Alliance Evangelical Divinity School	Tổ 15, Khu phố 5, đường Bình Trưng, phường Bình Trưng Đông, thành phố Thủ Đức, thành phố Hồ Chí Minh.
2	Evangelical Church of Vietnam (North)	Hanoi Bible College	Số 02, đường Ngõ Trạm, phường Hàng Bông, quận Hoàn Kiếm, thành phố Hà Nội.
3	Vietnam Christian Mission	(Information not available)	Số 399, đường Mẹ Thứ, phường Hoà Châu, quận Cẩm Lệ, thành phố Đà Nẵng.
4	Baptist Convention of Vietnam	Vietnamese Baptist Theological Seminary	Số 161, đường Nguyễn Văn Trỗi, phường 11, quận Phú Nhuận, thành phố Hồ Chí Minh.
5	Vietnam Baptist Church	Vietnamese Baptist Theological School	Số 49, đường 711B, Lô A11 - Khu dân cư Đại học Bách Khoa, đường Nguyễn Duy Trinh, phường Phú Hữu, Thành phố Thủ Đức, Thành phố Hồ Chí Minh.
6	Presbyterian Church of Vietnam	(Information not available)	Số 542, đường Điện Biên Phủ, phường 10, quận 10, thành phố Hồ Chí Minh.
7	Vietnam Mennonite Church	Vietnam Mennonite Pastoral and Theological Center	Số 14K, đường Hoàng Quốc Việt, phường Phú Mỹ, quận 7, thành phố Hồ Chí Minh.
8	Christian Fellowship Church of Vietnam	(Information not available)	Số 14/6B, đường Trịnh Thị Miếng, ấp Đông, xã Thới Tam Thôn, huyện Hóc Môn, thành phố Hồ Chí Minh.
9	Assemblies of God in Vietnam	(Information not available)	Toà nhà New City Group, số 216 - 218, đường Quốc lộ 13, phường Hiệp Bình Chánh, thành phố Thủ Đức, thành phố Hồ Chí Minh.
10	Vietnam Seventh-Day Adventist Church	Christian Bible College	Số 2, đường Hoàng Văn Thụ, phường 9, quận Phú Nhuận, thành phố Hồ Chí Minh.

=== South Asia ===
==== India ====
- Southern Asia Bible College 1951, accredited by Asia Theological Association (ATA) and Bengaluru North University
- Calvary Bible College, Hyderabad, Telangana, India. Accredited by the National Theological Association (NTA)
- Mennonite Brethren Centenary Bible College 1920, affiliated with the Senate of Serampore College (University)
- India Bible College and Seminary 1930, affiliated with the Senate of Serampore College (University) and ATA (M.Div and D.Min)
- Faith Theological Seminary 1970, affiliated to the Senate of Serampore College (University) (G.Th, C.Th, B.A in theology, B.Miss, B.D, M.Th, D.Th)
- Clark Theological College 1972, affiliated to the Senate of Serampore College (University) (B.D, M.Th, D.Th, Diploma in Church Music - DCMM)
- Evangelical Theological Seminary of ACA 1973, accredited by ATA.
- New Life College, Bangalore 1978, accredited by Asia Theological Association (ATA)
- North India Institute of Post Graduate Theological Studies 1980, affiliated to the Senate of Serampore College (University)
- Filadelfia Bible College 1981, accredited by Asia Theological Association (ATA)
- South Asia Institute of Advanced Christian Studies 1982, accredited by ATA (M.A., M.Div, M.Th, D.Min, Ph.D. [ATA]) and affiliated with University of Mysore (M.A. and Ph.D. [Univ. Mysore])

==== Nepal ====
- Himalayan Graduate School of Theology (established 2008)
- Nepal Theological College (established 1978)
- Nepal Evangelical Holiness Theological Seminary
- Alpha Bible College & Seminary 2018, Accredited by GPTAM, certified member of AICCS (C.Th [Certificate of Theology], B.Th. [Bachelor of theology] BSAS [Bachelor of South Asian Studies], BIMS [Bachelor of Intercultural and Mission Studies], M.Div.)

== Latin America ==
- Instituto Bíblico Epicentro (Monterrey, Mexico) www.institutoepicentro.com
- Charis Instituto Bíblico (Querétaro, Mexico)
- Cristo para las Naciones Monterrey (Monterrey, Mexico)
- Escola Superior de Teologia (Faculdades EST) (São Leopoldo, Rio Grande do Sul, Brazil)
- Escuela de Teologia VIDA (La Cieba, Atlantida, Honduras)
- Faculdade Nazarena do Brasil (Campinas, Brazil)
- Facultad de Teología Reformada de Chile (Santiago, Chile) https://www.facultaddeteologiareformada.cl/
- Faculdade Luterana de Teologia (São Bento do Sul, SC, Brazil)
- Faculdade Teológica Sul Americana (Londrina, Paraná, Brazil)
- Instituto de Estudios Superiores Bíblicos (Sonora, Mexico)
- Seminario Bautista Nogales (Sonora, Mexico)
- Universidad Madero - Seminario Metodista (Puebla, Sonora)
- Seminario Atkinson - Seminario Biblico de Mexico, Igelesia de Dios (Sonora, Mexico)
- Instituto João Calvino (Recife, Pernambuco, Brazil)
- Instituto Teológico Batista Reformado Sola Scriptura (Balneário Camboriú, Santa Catarina, Brasil)
- Seminario Bíblico de Puebla (Puebla, Puebla, México)
- Seminário Bíblico do Nordeste (Carpina, Pernambuco, Brazil)
- Instituto Teológico Boa Terra (Curitiba, Paraná, Brazil)
- Seminario Bíblico Guatemalteco (Chimaltenango, Guatemala)
- Seminario Internacional Teológico Bautista (Buenos Aires, Argentina)
- Seminario para la Predicacion Expositiva (Siguatepeque, Comayagua, Honduras)
- Seminario Teológico Do Brasil (São Paulo, Brazil)
- Seminario Teológico Centroamericano (Guatemala, Guatemala)
- SETECEB - Seminário Teológico Cristão Evangélico do Brasil (Anápolis-GO, Brazil)
- Instituto de Teologia Logos (ITL) (Brazil)
- Instituto Teológico Jeová Rafá (Brazil)
- Seminario Teológico Presbiteriano de México (Ciudad de México)

== See also ==
- The Evangelical Training Directory (which lists training institutions which are members of Evangelical Alliances and other bodies related to the World Evangelical Alliance) is endorsed by the World Evangelical Alliance as a central directory of evangelical training worldwide
- List of members of the Association of Theological Schools in the United States and Canada
