= SLCC =

SLCC is an initialism that may refer to:

- St. Louis Car Co.
- Saint Louis Chess Club
- St. Louis Community College
- Salt Lake Community College
- Salt Lake Comic Con
- Scottish Legal Complaints Commission
- Society of Local Council Clerks
- South London Christian College
- South Louisiana Community College
