= Yan Fook Theological Seminary =

- (Chinese: 恩福神學院)
- Former name: Yan Fook Bible Institute (until 2019)
- Motto: 聖言裝備 承傳使命 敬虔事主 牧養群羊 (Translated: Equipped by the Word, Inheriting the Mission, Serving God Devoutly, Shepherding the Flock)
- Type: Seminary
- Established: 2001
- President: Patrick So (Chinese: 蘇穎智)
- Location: Floor 16, Yan Fook Centre, 789 Cheung Sha Wan Road, Cheung Sha Wan, Kowloon, Hong Kong
- Website: https://www.yfts.org/ (in Chinese)

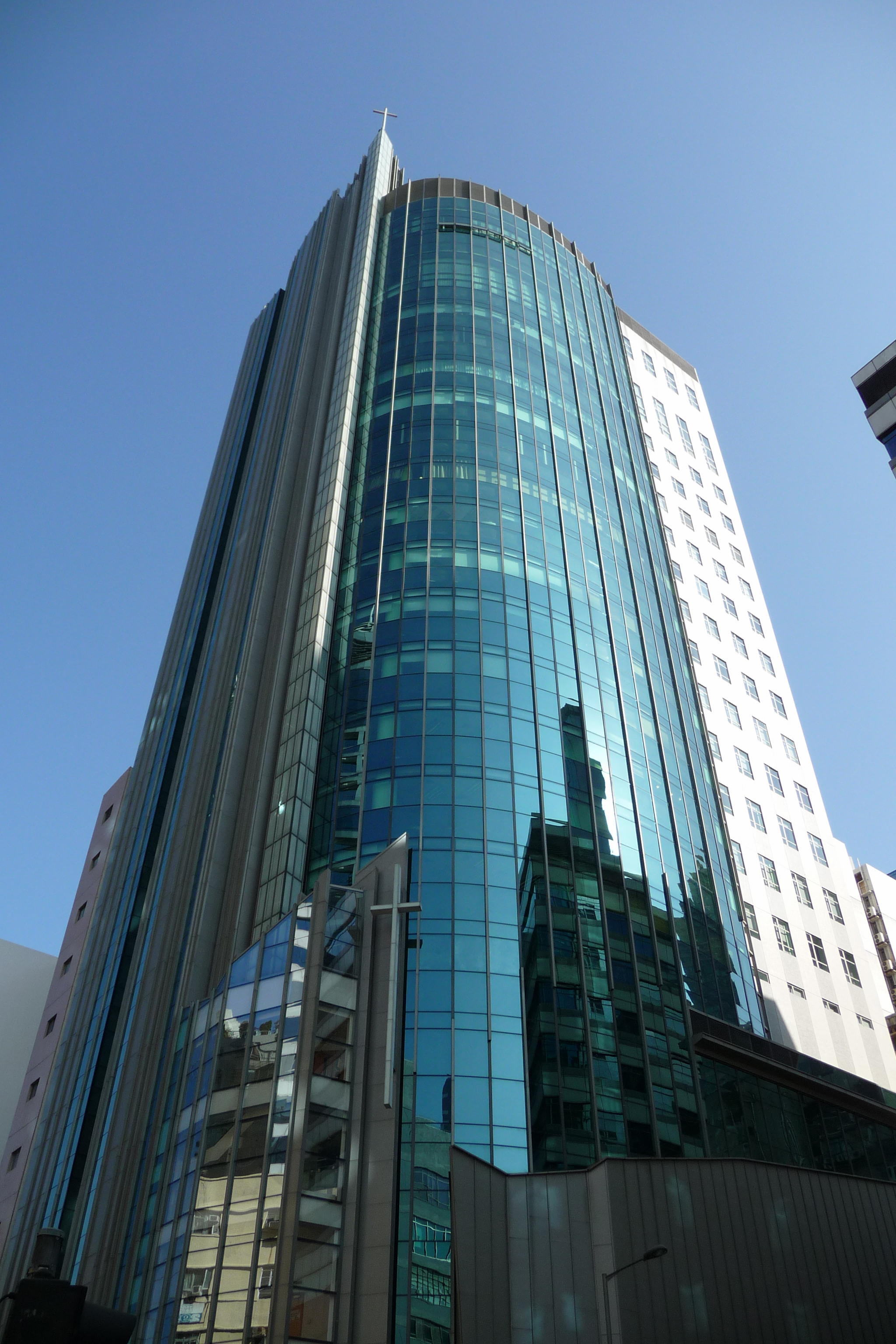
Yan Fook Centre, Lai Chi Kok

The Yan Fook Theological Seminary (known as "Yan Fook Bible Institute" before 2019) is a Christian theological college established in 2001 by the Yan Fook Church of the Evangelical Free Church of China. The school is located on the 16th floor of the Yan Fook Centre, 789 Cheung Sha Wan Road, Cheung Sha Wan, Kowloon, Hong Kong. Yan Fook Theological Seminary is an accredited member of the Asia Theological Association.

== History ==
Since the establishment of the Yan Fook Church in 1987, the number of congregants continued to grow. By 1999, the number reached 2,000. In order to equip and build church leaders, the Yan Fook Church established the "Yan Fook Bible Institute" in 2001. The school's mission was to train lay leaders so that believers who are willing to serve in the church can obtain biblical and theological training and share the work of pastoral care and teaching. The programs of Master of Biblical Studies and Associate of Theology were offered.

In 2004, the school moved into the newly-built Yan Fook Center together with the Church.

In 2008, the full-time Master of Divinity program was introduced. In the same year, the Master of Biblical Studies and Associate of Theology programs were accredited by the Asia Theological Association.

In 2010, the full-time Bachelor of Theology program was launched.

In 2013, both the Master of Divinity and Bachelor of Theology programs were also accredited by the Asia Theological Association.

In 2019, the school was officially renamed "Yan Fook Theological Seminary". At the same time, both the Master of Arts and Associate of Arts programs in Cross-Cultural Missions were accredited by the Asia Theological Association.

== Courses ==
Yan Fook Theological Institute offers Christian courses of varying levels in a credit system, and accepts Yan Fook Church members and other church believers. The courses include:

- Associate of Arts in Biblical Studies
- Bachelor of Theology
- Associate of Arts in Cross-Cultural Missions
- Master of Arts in Cross-Cultural Missions
- Master of Arts in Biblical Studies
- Master of Divinity
- Bachelor of Arts in Biblical Studies
- Master of Arts in Expository Preaching

They are all accredited by the Asia Theological Association.

== Library ==
Located on the 16th floor of the Yan Fook Center, the library's purpose is to provide the resources and services needed for teaching and research at the seminary. It also serves the spiritual growth of the church members, such as Bible study sessions with group leaders and spiritual nourishment for believers.

In addition to its collection of books and periodicals on theology, church history, Christian doctrine, the Old and New Testaments, and missionary work, the library also houses practical books on counseling, parenting, and Christian life.

== Other information ==
The school is located in the Yan Fook Centre and has several halls, classrooms, meeting rooms, multi-purpose rooms and prayer rooms, as well as recreation and exercise facilities.

The current president is Patrick So Wing-chi.

Yan Fook Theological Seminary is an accredited member of the Asia Theological Association.

== Events ==
=== So's false statements and apology ===
In June 2013, So Wing-chi, president of the Yan Fook Theological Seminary, while referring to the Divinity School of Chung Chi College in a sermon, implied that non-believers could be admitted to theology programs, even implying that non-believers could become preachers. In October of the same year, a group of Chung Chi Divinity School students and alumni issued a joint statement titled "Response to Rev. So Wing-chi's Criticism of Chung Chi Divinity School", stating that So's remarks were false and that it was extremely unfair to criticize without proper research, and demanded an apology. Later, So Wing-chi made an apology.

== See also ==
- Evangel Seminary
- List of evangelical seminaries and theological colleges
- Evangelical Free Church of China
