= Haruna Kuje Ayuba =

Vice Chancellor of Bingham University

- Occupations: Academic; Researcher; Geographer; Environmentalist

Academic background
- Education: Bayero University Kano; University of Ibadan

Academic work
- Discipline: Environmental Science
- Institutions: Bingham University

Haruna Kuje Ayuba is a Nigerian professor of environmental science and the current Vice Chancellor of Bingham University.

== Education ==
Haruna obtained his first degree in geography from Bayero University Kano in 1989. In 1992 and 1998, he obtained his master's degree and PhD degree from the University of Ibadan.

== Career ==
He started his academic journey as a graduate assistant at the University of Maiduguri.

== Memberships and fellowships ==
Haruna is a member of Association of Nigerian Geographers, the Nigerian Environmental Society (NES) and the American Association for the Advancement of Science (AAAS)

== Administrative appointment ==
Haruna became the Deputy Vice Chancellor of Nasarawa State University, Keffi in 2021 and he became the Vice Chancellor of Bingham University in 2023
