= River School =

Coordinates: 52.225519°N 2.20992°W

The River School

Location
- Droitwich Road; Worcester, Worcestershire, WR3 7ST; England

Information
- Type: Independent Christian School
- Motto: "Shaping Character, Pursuing Excellence"
- Religious affiliation: Christian (Evangelical base)
- Established: 1985
- Local authority: Worcestershire
- Chair: Mrs K Badger
- Head teacher: Mrs Ellin
- Staff: Approximately 40
- Gender: Co-educational
- Age: 2 to 16
- Enrolment: 100 full time pupils
- Houses: Severn, Avon & Wye
- Latest ISI Inspection: January 2024
- DSCF Number: 885/6030
- Proprietor: Worcester Christian Education Trust
- Website: http://www.riverschool.co.uk/

The River School is an independent Christian School, affiliated with the Christian Schools Trust. The school is located in Worcester, England, in a large, late Georgian, Grade II listed building, with many outbuildings, set in 8.5 acres (34,000 m^{2}) of wooded and open grassed areas, near the A38 road in the Fernhill Heath suburb of Worcester, England.

The school has about 140 full-time day pupils, aged from 2 to 16, who are drawn from the city of Worcester, and surrounding towns The school is non-denominational.

A report in February 2013, by the Bridge Schools Inspectorate, rated the overall quality of teaching as good, with outstanding elements.

== History ==
The school was founded in the autumn of 1985, by parents who felt that the secular education found in the local schools did not fit with their beliefs. The school had been planned for several years by the parents, many of whom were members of churches in and around Worcester. Oakfield House, where the school is sited, was purchased by the Worcester Christian Education Trust, which oversees the running of the school to this day.

Oakfield House was constructed in the early 19th century, as a private house, and has since been used as: military billets, a residential girls' school and an Agricultural Training College under the control of Worcester LEA. In 1987, the Trust purchased another building close to central Worcester for use as the Brook Nursery School, for pupils aged 2–7.

The school continued to expand, aided by a low-fee philosophy and generous discounts for less well-off students. However, the River School, like many a small enterprise, has suffered setbacks over the years due to a lack of funds. For this reason, it was decided in 2006 to sell off the Brook School, and use the money to service the trust's debt and improve the school's resources base. Since then, the nursery has been reopened as part of The River School, which has since been greatly expanded.

== Alumni ==
- Ted Hill (rugby union)
