= Christ's Disciples Training Seminary =

Christ's Disciples Training Seminary (Chinese: 基督門徒訓練神學院)
- Motto: "It is no longer I who live, but Christ lives in me;" (Chinese: "不再是我，乃是基督。"Galatians 2:20）
- Type: Private, seminary
- Established: 1981
- President: Rev. Jung-Hua Tu (杜榮華)
- Location: No. 100, Lane 297, Yuanyuan Road, Nuannuan District, Keelung City, Republic of China (Taiwan)
- Campus: Suburban
- Website: www.cdts.org.tw

The Christ's Disciples Training Seminary is a cross-denominational and cross-church theological institution in Taiwan. Founded by Elder Wu Yong in 1981, the school has developed into a Christian seminary offering programs for certificates, bachelor and master degrees. Its campus is located in Nuannuan District, Keelung City, Taiwan.

== History ==
In 1981, the "Christ Disciple Training Center" was founded by Elder Wu Yong. It was on Zhonghe Road, Yonghe District, Taipei County (formerly the Shuanghe Presbyterian Church in Taiwan).

In 1998, the school moved to Nuannuan District, Keelung City, and was renamed "Christ's Disciple Training College".

Initially, no degree certificates were awarded upon graduation or completion of studies. In 2001, the board of directors resolved to expand the academic system, offering master's, bachelor's, certificate, and continuing education programs, with degrees and certificates awarded upon graduation or completion of studies.

In 2006, a Master's program in Biblical Studies was added.

In 2011, the school was renamed "Christ's Disciples Training Seminary".

In 2013, a "Master of Divinity" program was added.

In 2019, the Christ's Disciples Training Seminary held its graduation ceremony and presidential handover ceremony. Both the new president, Elder Jung-Hua Tu, and the outgoing president, Wang Liangyu, had served in the Church for over thirty years.

In 2021, Christ's Disciples Training Seminary celebrated its 40th anniversary.

== Academic Programs and Courses ==
The programs offered by Christ's Disciples Training Seminary include:

- Master of Divinity (M.Div.)
- Master of Pastoral Ministry
- Master of Bible Studies
- Bachelor of Pastoral Ministry
- Certificate in Pastoral Ministry
- Continuing Pastoral Education

== Presents ==
The former and present presidents of the seminary are:

Name	Term of Office
Wu Yong	1981-1984
Shao Zunlan	1984-1986
Wang Chuansheng	1988-2007
Wang Liangyu	2007-2019
Du Ronghua	2019-Present

== Campus ==
Christ's Disciples Training Seminary is located in Nuannuan District, Keelung City, nestled beside Yuemei Mountain and bordering the Keelung River. The campus is also adjacent to a community park and activity center.

The school building covers an area of 1000-ping (approximately 333 square meters), within which are an auditorium, offices, a library, classrooms, a cafeteria, an activity center, and dormitories for students and staff.

== See also ==
- Holy Light Theological Seminary,
- China Evangelical Seminary,
- Central Taiwan Theological Seminary,
- List of evangelical seminaries and theological colleges
