= Bernard Doro =

Nigerian Minister

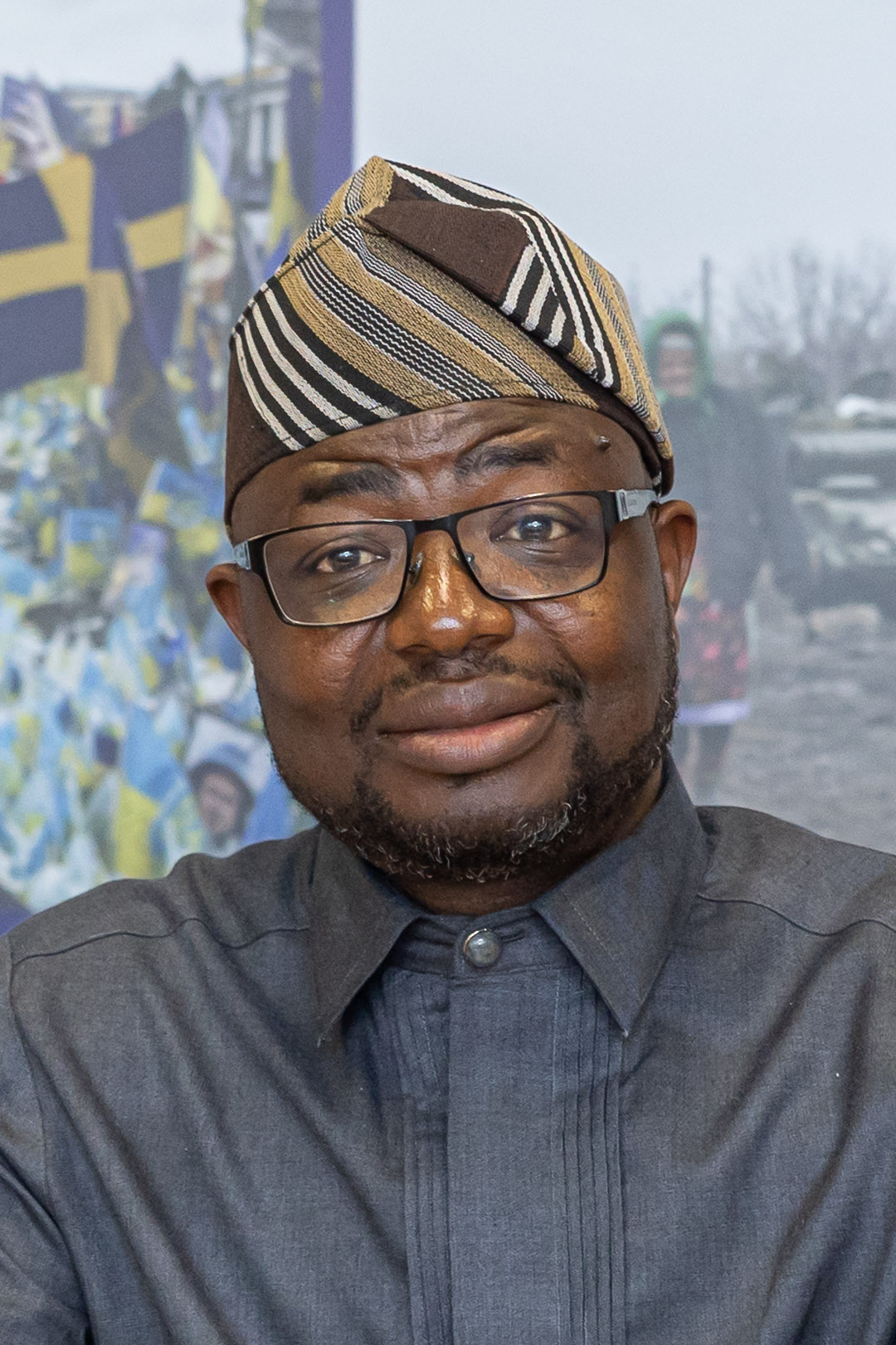
- Doro in 2026

Minister of Humanitarian Affairs and Poverty Alleviation
- Incumbent
- Assumed office 6 November 2025
- President: Bola Tinubu
- Preceded by: Nentawe Yilwatda

Personal details
- Born: January 23, 1969 (age 57) Kwall, Bassa, Plateau State, Nigeria
- Party: All Progressives Congress
- Education: University of Jos (BPharm)University of London (LLB) (MBA) (MSc)
- Occupation: Pharmacist, lawyer, administrator

Bernard Mohammed Doro (born 23 January 1969) is a Nigerian pharmacist, lawyer, and politician who has served as the Minister of Humanitarian Affairs and Poverty Alleviation since November 2025.He was nominated by President Bola Tinubu and confirmed by the Nigerian Senate on 30 October 2025 to replace Nentawe Yilwatda, who had been appointed as the national chairman of the All Progressives Congress.

== Early life and education ==
Doro was born on 23 January 1969 in Kwall, a town in the Bassa Local Government Area of Plateau State, Nigeria. He holds a Bachelor of Pharmacy degree from the University of Jos in Nigeria, a Bachelor of Laws from the University of London, a Master of Business Administration (MBA) with a focus on IT-driven business strategy, and a Master of Science in Advanced Clinical Practice.

== Career ==
Doro began his professional career as a senior pharmacist at Bingham University Teaching Hospital in Jos, Plateau State. He later relocated to the United Kingdom, where he worked for over two decades in the National Health Service (NHS) as an Advanced Clinical Practitioner and Independent Prescriber. His roles included frontline experience in urgent care, walk-in centres, general practitioner practices, and hospital settings.

=== Political career ===
Doro is a member of the All Progressives Congress (APC) and serves as the Financial Secretary of the APC UK Chapter. In October 2025, President Tinubu nominated him for the position of Minister of Humanitarian Affairs and Poverty Alleviation to fill the vacancy left by Nentawe Yilwatda's appointment as APC national chairman. His nomination was screened and confirmed by the Senate on 30 October 2025 after a brief session lasting less than 30 minutes. He was sworn in by President Tinubu on 6 November 2025 alongside Kingsley Udeh.
