= ECWA =

ECWA may refer to:

- Evangelical Church Winning All, a Protestant Christian denomination in Nigeria
- East Coast Wrestling Association, an American professional wrestling promotion
