= United Wesleyan Graduate Institute =

- 衛道神學研究院

Location
- 8/F., No. 5 Tong Yam Street, Tai Hang Tung, Kowloon; Hong Kong; 22°19′46″N 114°10′14″E

Information
- School type: Religious training institution
- Established: September 2001
- president: Professor Jeremiah Chu (Acting)
- Website: https://uwgi-hk.org/ (in Chinese)

The United Wesleyan Graduate Institute (UWI) is a Methodist seminary founded in 2001 by seven Methodist groups: OMS International, the Hong Kong Evangelical Church, the Free Methodist Church of Hong Kong, the Church of the Nazarene, Hong Kong District, the Church of United Brethren in Christ, the Salvation Army, Hong Kong and Macau Command, and the Wesleyan Church, North America. It is an interdenominational seminary located at 5 Tong Yam Street, Tai Hang Tung, Kowloon.

== History ==
In September, 2001, the United Wesleyan Graduate Institute was jointly established by seven Methodist groups: the OMS International, the Hong Kong Evangelical Church, the Free Methodist Church of Hong Kong, the Church of the Nazarene (Hong Kong District), the Church of United Brethren in Christ, the Salvation Army (Hong Kong and Macau Command), and the Wesleyan Church (North America). Rev. Yi Qinian (Chinese: 易啟年) was president of the special committee.

In 2006, Rev. Paul Lee took office as the first president of the institute starting from September. Before that, he was professor of the Bible Department, Vice President and Acting President of the Evangel Theological Seminary.

In February 2007, the school became a member of the Hong Kong Theological Education Association (HKTEA).

Since its establishment, the institute has been located at 5 Tong Yam Street, Tai Hang Tung, Kowloon, Hong Kong.

== Academic Programs ==
United Wesleyan Graduate Institute offers a range of degree programs across three main tracks:

- Pastoral Leadership Track:
  - Bachelor of Theology
  - Master of Divinity
  - Master of Theology
- Lay Leadership Track:
  - Associate of Christian Studies
  - Bachelor of Christian Studies
  - Master of Christian Studies
  - Master of Church Ministry
- Ministry Training Track:
  - Master of Youth Ministry

== Other information ==
United Wesleyan Graduate Institute has a faculty of five full-time teachers, with Professor Jeremiah Chu as the current president. In addition, there are adjunct and guest professors.

The United Wesleyan Graduate Institute Library has a collection of 9,227 volumes.

The United Wesleyan Graduate Institute is a non-denominational seminary and pays attention to the relationship between Christianity, Chinese culture and China's modernization.

Address: No. 5 Tong Yam Street, Tai Hang Tung, Kowloon, Hong Kong.

== See also ==
- List of evangelical seminaries and theological colleges
