= China Baptist Theological College =

The China Baptist Theological College (CBTC; Chinese: 中國浸信會神學院), also called China Baptist Theological Seminary, is an educational institution located in Sha Tin, Hong Kong. Established by the Baptist World Alliance in 1966, the school is now an accredited member of the Asia Theological Association, and one of the first overseas theological schools recognized by the China Christian Council.

== History ==
In 1966, the "Hong Kong Baptist Bible College" was founded by the Baptist World Alliance at 309 Prince Edward Road, Kowloon City, Kowloon, Hong Kong. In the following years, the Bible College only offered courses for three-year diploma and Christian Living Certificate.

In 1972, the college relocated to its own premises at 17 Fuk Tsun Street, Tai Kok Tsui, Kowloon.

In 1980s, the college established a four-year bachelor's degree program. Meanwhiles, in order to incorporate elements of ministry in China, the school was officially renamed "China Baptist Theological College", with the emblem modified to feature a map of China.

In 1996, the college purchased a 6,000-square-foot plot of land in Ha Wo Che, Sha Tin. In the same year, the school appointed its first Chinese president.

In 1999 and 2001 respectively, the college launched the programs of Pastoral Studies and Full-time Master of Divinity. In 2001, the college established a sister school partnership with the Cornerstone University's Asia-based Asia Biblical Theological Seminary. Consequently, the degrees offered by China Baptist Theological College were recognized by both Cornerstone University and Cornerstone University's Grand Rapids Theological Seminary.

After nearly a decade of application and planning, the campus expansion was finally completed in July 2006. The new premises consist of three independent, three-story buildings, each 700 square feet, for a total floor area of 6,300 square feet. There is also a garden and the environment is quiet.

In 2007, the programs of Master of Ministry and one-year Advanced Certificate in Biblical Studies were launched.

In 2023, Rev. Shen Zhixiong was appointed president of the college.

== Courses ==
The Full-time Programs offered by China Baptist Theological College in 2025 include:

- Master of Divinity (three years)
- Bachelor of Theology (four years)
- Diploma in Theology (four years)
- Advanced Certificate in Biblical Studies (one year)

In addition, there are Counseling courses, pastoral training courses and lay leadership training courses. They are mostly accredited by the Asia Theological Association.

== Other information ==
- The college has seven teachers, including President Pastor Shen Zhixiong (Chinese: 沈志雄).
- The college is an accredited member of the Asia Theological Association, and one of the first overseas theological schools recognized by the China Christian Council.
- The college implements small class education, ensuring that students can gain a deeper understanding and appreciation of their subjects through questioning and discussion, and strengthening their relationships with teachers.
- Students of Bachelor of Divinity and Master of Divinity must study Greek and Hebrew to gain a deeper understanding of the original meaning of the Bible.
- Each student is assigned an alumnus who regularly monitors their needs, shares their experiences, and offers encouragement and support.
- Every three years, the college organizes a Holy Land trip to Israel, Jordan, Egypt, etc. to experience firsthand the places visited by biblical characters and the footsteps of Jesus. The college also maintains a Holy Land Fund to cover half of students' travel expenses.
- Campus address: 95 Ha Wo Che, Shatin, New Territories, Hong Kong.

== See also ==
- Asia Theological Association
- List of evangelical seminaries and theological colleges
