= Yan Fook Church =

Church in Hong Kong

Coordinates: 22°20′16″N 114°08′59″E

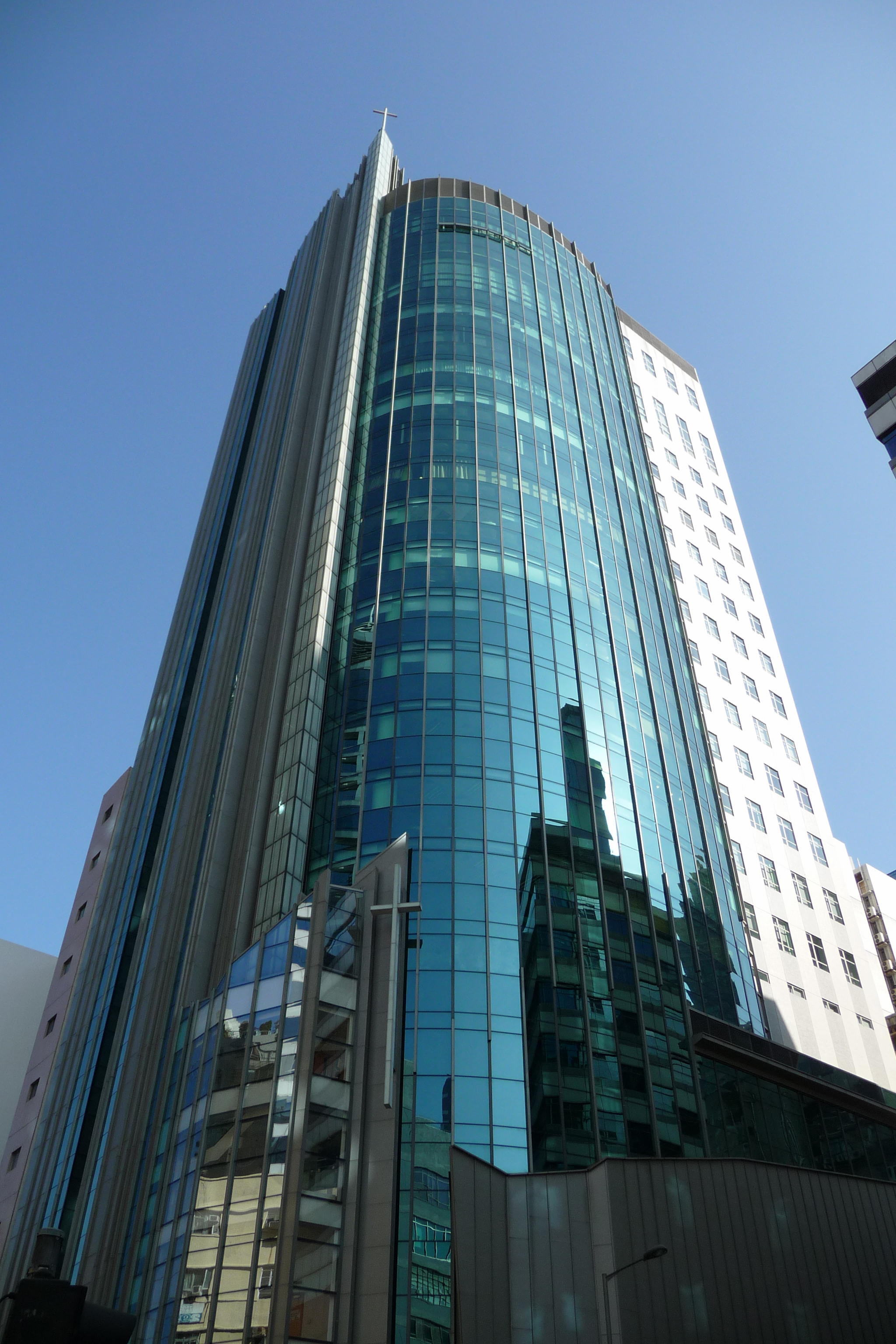
Yan Fook Church is located in the Yan Fuk Centre in Cheung Sha Wan.

Yan Fook Church (Chinese: 恩福堂), full name "Evangelical Free Church of China – Yan Fook Church" (EFCC Yan Fook Church), is one of the largest Christian churches in Hong Kong. The church was founded in 1984 with about 100 congregants. By the end of 2008, the number of worshippers increased to more than 10,000.

== History ==
Yan Fook Church was originally a branch of the Evangelical Free Church of China - Waterloo Road Hill Gospel Church. In 1984, in order to solve the crowded worship situation, about 100 congregants of the Waterloo Road Hill Gospel Church moved to the school building of Fang Fang Primary School in Kowloon Tong, Hong Kong to hold worship meetings without a dedicated pastor.

In April 1986, Pastor So Wing-chi and his family returned to Hong Kong from the United States and was hired to pastor this group.

In September 1987, Yan Fook Church was officially established based on the group.

From 1987 to April 2004, the new Church held meetings in ten different locations, moving every two years on average.

In May 2004, Yan Fook Church moved to its own property, Yan Fook Centre, in Cheung Sha Wan. The centre is a 20-storey building, built by the Church after purchasing land. In the same year, the number of worshippers exceeded 5,000.

At the end of 2008, the number of worshippers increased to more than 10,000. To date, the number of worshippers at Yan Fook Church remains around 10,000.

== Beliefs ==
Yan Fook Church holds the following belief positions based on the Bible:

- The Trinity: God the Father, Son, and Holy Spirit
- The divinity and humanity of Jesus Christ
- Salvation through Jesus’ sacrificial death and resurrection
- The authority and inerrancy of the Bible
- The second coming of Christ and final judgment
- Eternal life for believers and eternal separation for non-believers

== Ministries and Structure ==
In addition to the establishment of the Deacon Council, the organizational structure of Yan Fook Church can be divided into eight Pastoral areas with several departments:

- Worship and Prayer: Worship and Prayer Ministries
- Evangelism and Missions: Evangelism, Missions, and China Ministries
- Discipleship and Education: Adult Christian Education, Small Group Leader Training, Library
- Care and Fellowship: Counseling, Social Concern, Family, Youth, Children, Men's Ministry
- Support Services: Media, IT, Hospitality, Membership

Yan Fook Church employs both fellowship-based and small group pastoral models. Fellowships are categorized by age and life stage, including groups for seniors, adults, couples, young professionals, university students, single parents, and mothers.

== Yan Fook Theological Seminary ==
In order to cultivate believer leaders and spiritual life of believers, Yan Fook Church established Yan Fook Bible College in 2001 and changed its name to "Yan Fook Theological Seminary" in 2019. The school offers theological courses of different levels, from certificates to master's degrees, for Yan Fook Church members and other church believers to study.

== Library ==
Located on the 16th floor of the Yan Fook Center, the library's purpose is to provide the resources and services needed for teaching and research at the seminary. It also serves the spiritual growth of the church members, such as Bible study sessions with group leaders and spiritual nourishment for believers.

In addition to its collection of books and periodicals on theology, church history, Christian doctrine, the Old and New Testaments, and missionary work, the library also houses practical books on counseling, parenting, and Christian life.

== Other information ==
- Yan Fook Church is located at: 789 Cheung Sha Wan Road, Cheung Sha Wan, Kowloon, Hong Kong.
- The Church is affiliated to the Evangelical Free Church of China (EFCC)
- In addition to Cantonese worship, there are worship in English and Mandarin.

== Controversy ==
=== Domestic Violence Ordinance ===
Pastor So Wing-chi of Yan Fook Church made some controversial remarks on the "Domestic Violence Ordinance", including publicly calling on believers to gather to protest the amendment of the Domestic Violence Ordinance, and pointed out that homosexuals should not be protected by the violence ordinance, and that same-sex cohabitation would cause many social problems.

=== Pastor So Wing-chi is accused of publicly recommending three pro-establishment lawmakers ===
Some church members claimed that in his sermon at a church service in 2008, Pastor So Wing-chi asked church members to support the church members of accounting candidate Paul Chan Mo-po and medical candidate Ho Pak-leung, violating the spirit of fair and open elections and the separation of church and state, and that religious forces were interfering in politics. If this is true, the relevant persons may have violated the law. However, both Ho Pak-leung and Chan Mo-po attended the church sermon that day and said that Pastor So did not ask church members to vote for them but only to pray for the three. Another candidate, Priscilla Leung, who was not a member of the church, said she was unaware of the situation.

== See also ==
- Evangelical Free Church of China
- Yan Fook Theological Seminary
