= Evangelical Church Winning All =

Christian denomination in Nigeria

Evangelical Church Winning All (ECWA)
- Logo of the Evangelical Church Winning All
- Classification: Protestant
- Orientation: Evangelical
- Theology: Evangelical Protestant
- President: Rev. Dr. Job Ayuba Bagat Mallam
- Founder: Sudan Interior Mission
- Origin: 1954; Nigeria
- Separated from: Sudan Interior Mission (SIM)
- Congregations: 6,000+
- Members: 8,000,000 (estimated)
- Official website: ecwaglobal.org

The Evangelical Church Winning All (ECWA), formerly known as the Evangelical Church of West Africa, is a major Protestant Christian denomination in Nigeria with an estimated membership of over 8 million and more than 6,000 local churches across Nigeria and 18 other countries. Headquartered in Jos, Plateau State, ECWA is a partner of the international Christian mission organization Serving In Mission (SIM), formerly known as Sudan Interior Mission. The denomination is known for its extensive network of churches, educational institutions, healthcare facilities, and missionary activities, particularly in Nigeria's central and northern regions, where it has significantly influenced spiritual, social, and economic life.

== History ==
ECWA traces its origins to the missionary work of the Sudan Interior Mission (SIM), established in 1893 by North American missionaries Walter Gowans, Roland Bingham, and Thomas Kent, who aimed to spread Christianity in West Africa. The first evangelical church in the region was founded around 1908, primarily in northern Nigeria. In 1954, SIM-related churches in Nigeria united to form an independent indigenous body, initially named the Evangelical Church of West Africa, which was renamed the Evangelical Church Winning All in 2011 to reflect its evangelistic mission and global outreach.

ECWA grew rapidly in the mid-20th century, particularly in Nigeria's Middle Belt, establishing a significant presence through church planting, education, and healthcare initiatives. By the late 20th century, it had expanded internationally, establishing congregations in countries such as the United States, Canada, the United Kingdom, and Israel.

=== Key milestones ===
ECWA's development includes several significant milestones:

- 1918: Establishment of the School of Prophets in Igbaja, which became ECWA Theological Seminary, Igbaja, the denomination's first degree-awarding institution.

- 1954: Formation of ECWA as an indigenous body, marking the transition from SIM oversight to Nigerian leadership under figures like Rev. Dr. Panya Baba.

- 2005: Founding of Bingham University in Karu, Nasarawa State, expanding ECWA's educational outreach.

- 2011: Renaming to Evangelical Church Winning All, reflecting its global mission.

=== Notable leaders ===
Notable leaders include Rev. Dr. Panya Baba, who spearheaded indigenization, and his son Rev. Dr. Stephen Panya Baba, president until 2024, known for advocating interfaith peace. The current president, Rev. Dr. Job Ayuba Bagat Mallam, elected in 2024, also serves as Chairman of Bingham University's Board of Trustees.

== Doctrine and beliefs ==
ECWA adheres to evangelical Protestant theology, emphasizing salvation through faith in Jesus Christ, the authority of the Bible, and the call to evangelism.

Its statement of faith affirms belief in one God existing in three persons (Father, Son, and Holy Spirit), the deity and humanity of Jesus Christ, the Holy Spirit's role in empowering believers, and the inerrancy of the sixty-six books of the Old and New Testaments.

ECWA's worship services often incorporate Hausa-language hymns and sermons, reflecting its strong presence in northern Nigeria. The denomination opposes the expansion of Sharia in northern Nigeria, advocating for religious freedom and Christian values in public life.

Annual themes, set by the General Church Council, guide spiritual focus and are integrated into sermons, conferences, and outreach efforts, addressing contemporary challenges like unity and perseverance.

== Governance and structure ==
ECWA operates a four-tiered hierarchical structure, with its headquarters in Jos, Plateau State, led by a president, currently Rev. Dr. Job Ayuba Bagat Mallam.

The governance structure comprises the General Church Council (GCC), District Church Councils (DCCs), Local Church Councils (LCCs), and Local Church Boards (LCBs), ensuring effective administration across its vast network.

- General Church Council (GCC): The GCC is the highest decision-making body, comprising the ECWA Executive, Incorporated Trustees, three delegates from each of the approximately 91 DCCs, and heads of ECWA institutions. It meets annually in Jos to set policies, approve new DCCs, and address denominational issues. In 2019, the GCC approved Yamel-East DCC but rejected Gwantu DCC due to insufficient qualifications.

- District Church Councils (DCCs): Approximately 91 DCCs oversee LCCs within geographic areas, managing church planting and regional evangelism. Examples include Ilorin DCC and Kano DCC, which faced a leadership dispute in 2018.

- Local Church Councils (LCCs): Approximately 650 LCCs manage clusters of local churches, overseeing pastoral activities and community outreach, led by senior pastors and elders.

- Local Church Boards (LCBs): LCBs oversee individual congregations' daily operations, including worship and community programs, reporting to LCCs. Ilorin DCC's LCBs grew from serving 7,000 to 21,000 worshippers between 1995 and 2019.

- International Structure: International DCCs in countries like the US and UK adapt the structure for diaspora communities, maintaining ties with Jos.

== Membership and demographics ==
ECWA's estimated 8 million members are predominantly in Nigeria's Middle Belt and northern regions, with significant Hausa, Yoruba, and other ethnic groups, including Gbagyi, Nupe and Southern Kaduna such as Atyap, Jju, Jaba etc. . The denomination's use of Hausa as a primary language reflects its strong presence among Hausa-speaking communities, though English is used in urban areas. Membership has grown significantly, with some churches, like those in Ilorin DCC, reporting 400% growth in recent decades. Internationally, ECWA serves diaspora communities in 18 countries, including the US, Canada, and UK, though precise membership figures abroad are unavailable. The denomination appeals to diverse age groups, with youth and women's ministries playing a significant role in community engagement.

== Annual themes ==
Since 1997, ECWA has adopted annual themes to guide its spiritual and evangelistic activities, set by the General Church Council to address contemporary challenges and unify congregations. These themes, drawn from biblical verses, shape sermons, conferences, and outreach programs. For instance, the 2020 theme, “Not by Might nor by Power, but by My Spirit” (Zechariah 4:6), guided ECWA's response to the COVID-19 pandemic, emphasizing faith-based community support through food distribution and virtual services. Recent themes include:

| Year | Theme | Biblical Reference |
|---|---|---|
| 2027 | Press On Towards the Goal | Philippians 3:14 |
| 2026 | Keep your Lamps Burning | Luke 12:35 |
| 2025 | Seek Me and You Will Find Me | Jeremiah 29:13 |
| 2024 | For the Vision is Yet for an Appointed Time | Habakkuk 2:3 |
| 2023 | Occupy till I Come | Luke 19:13 |
| 2022 | Look, He is Coming with the Clouds | Revelation 1:7 |
| 2021 | Christ in You, the Hope of Glory | Colossians 1:27 |
| 2020 | Not by Might nor by Power, but by My Spirit | Zechariah 4:6 |

== Controversies and challenges ==
ECWA has faced significant challenges, particularly in northern Nigeria, where members have been targeted by violence. In April 2024, Rev. Manasseh Ibrahim was killed by bandits along the Birnin Gwari-Kaduna Highway. In July 2025, Rev. Anthony Lamba and two others were abducted in Kajuru, Kaduna State. Internally, a 2018 leadership dispute in Kano DCC led to protests in 2025 over a council split, reflecting governance tensions. ECWA's opposition to Sharia expansion since 1999 has drawn criticism from some Muslim groups, who view it as confrontational, though ECWA maintains it advocates for religious freedom. The denomination has responded by engaging in interfaith dialogue, notably through the Interfaith Code of Conduct, to promote peace.

== Major institutions ==
| Institution | Type | Location | Founded |
|---|---|---|---|
| Bingham University | University | Karu, Nasarawa State | 2005 |
| ECWA Theological Seminary, Igbaja | Seminary | Igbaja, Kwara State | 1918 |
| ECWA Theological Seminary, Kagoro | Seminary | Kagoro, Kaduna State | 1931 |
| Jos ECWA Theological Seminary | Seminary | Jos, Plateau State | 1980 |
| Bingham University Teaching Hospital (formally ECWA Evangel Hospital) | Hospital | Jos, Plateau State | 1959 |
| ECWA College of Health Technology Kagoro | School | Kagoro, Kaduna State | 1959 |
| ECWA Hospital Egbe | Hospital | Egbe, Kogi State | 1952 |

== See also ==
- Serving In Mission
- Bingham University
- ECWA Evangel Hospital, Jos
- ECWA Hospital Egbe, Kogi State
- ECWA Theological Seminary
- Evangelicalism § Africa
