= Bible Seminary of Hong Kong =

- 香港神學院
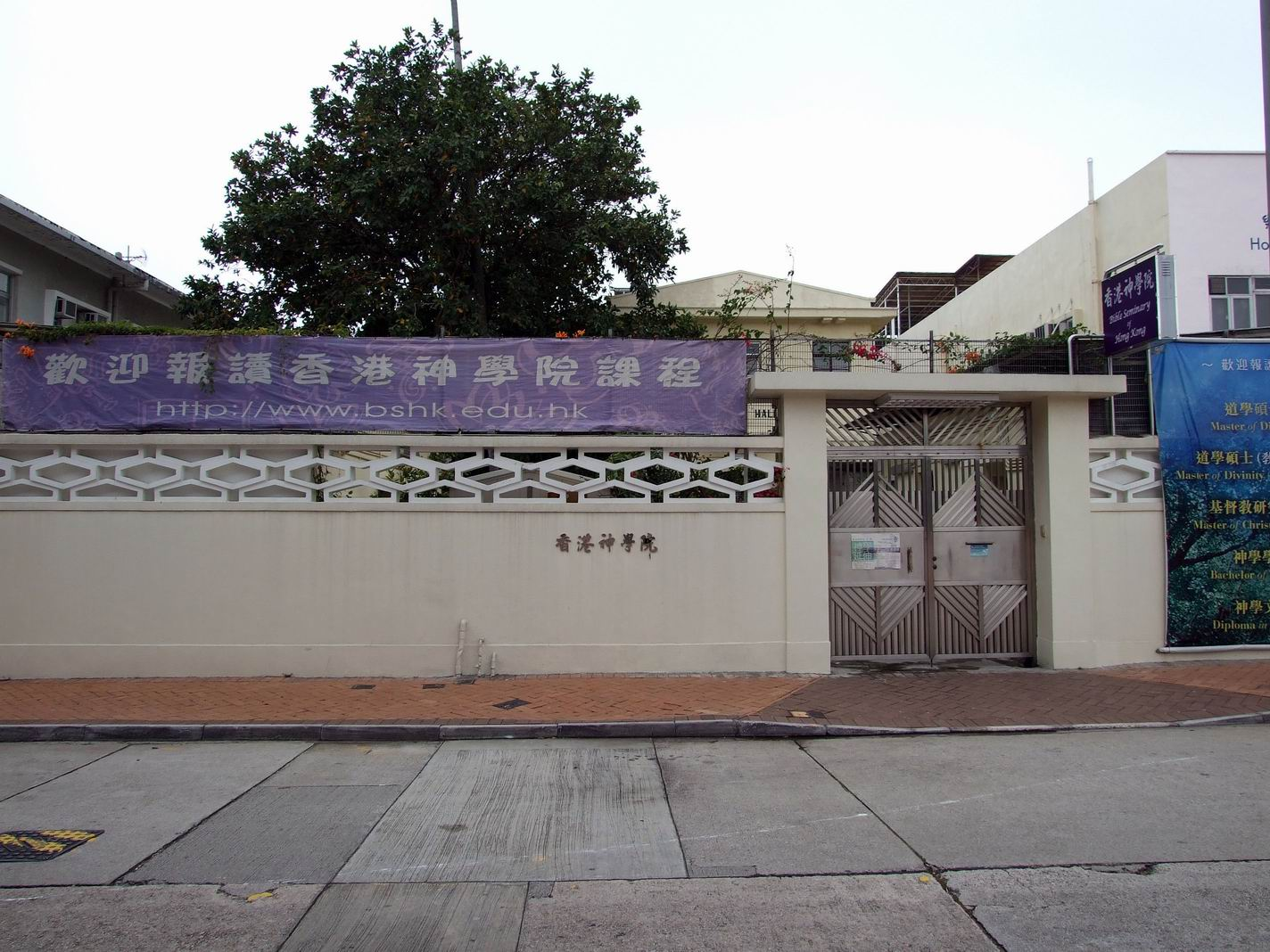
- Bible Seminary of Hong Kong
- 15&17 Cumberland Road, Kowloon Tong, Kowloon; Hong Kong

Information
- Former name: 香港聖經學院 (Hong Kong Bible College)
- School type: Religious education
- Established: 1952
- Founder: Yu Luzhen, Ngan Dongmei, Hui Zhenzhen, and Rong Yuqin, etc
- Principal: Richard Tin-Wo Cheung
- Affiliation: China Native Evangelistic Crusade
- Website: https://www.bshk.edu.hk/ (in Chinese)

The Bible Seminary of Hong Kong (BSHK) is a Protestant theological institution in Hong Kong. Founded by several fellow members of the China Native Evangelistic Crusade (CNEC) in 1952, BSHK is now an accredited member of the Asia Theological Association. It is a non-denominational school committed to providing theological education focused on evangelism, discipleship and church growth. Since 2003, BSHK has held a large public lecture series every April.

== History ==
In 1952, the "Hong Kong Bible College" (Chinese: 香港聖經學院) was founded by several fellow members of the China Native Evangelistic Crusade (CNEC). Its early sponsor and advisor was Rev. Song Decheng, head of the CNEC. Its first president was Rev. Zhou Zhiyu, a former overseer of the mission. The college was located on Ma Tau Wai Road, Hung Hom, Kowloon, Hong Kong.

In 1960, the school moved to its current location at 17 Cumberland Road, Kowloon Tong, Kowloon.

In 1970, Hong Kong Bible College was renamed "Bible Seminary of Hong Kong" (Chinese: 香港神學院). And degree programs in theology were developed.

In 1990, the Believer Theology Diploma Program was established.

In 1998, the school established the Bible Extension Certificate Program. In 1999, it launched the new programs of Bachelor of Theology and Diploma in Theology.

Since 2003, the school has held a large public lecture series on a theme each April, and also published a book series titled "Contemporary Church Issues."

In 2006, three new master's programs were established: the Master of Divinity, the Master of Divinity (Pastoral Studies), and the Master of Christian Studies.

Starting in 2019, the school added the programs of Higher Diploma in Theology and Bachelor of Christian Studies. In 2020, the school launched the dual degree program BCS & M.Div. in Christian Studies.

In late 2022, the school started expansion. The renovated campus opened in September 2023, providing upgraded facilities and a comfortable and family-friendly learning environment for the students. It covers an area of approximately 34,000 square feet.

== Teachers and students ==
In year 2025, the teaching team of the Bible Seminary of Hong Kong includes 9 full-time teachers, 4 visiting professors and 8 guest lecturers. The president of the seminary is Rev. Dr. Richard Tin-Wo Cheung.

There are over sixty full-time students in the seminary, with an annual admission of over 10.

== Course Information ==
The main programs offered in 2025 include

- Master of Divinity (Full-time)
- Master of Divinity (Pastoral Studies, Part-time)
- Dual Degree Program (BCS/MDiv) (Full-time)
- Master of Arts (Full-time)
- Master of Christian Studies (Full-time/Part-time)
- Bachelor of Christian Studies (Full-time/Part-time)
- Bachelor of Theology (Full-time)
- Higher Diploma in Theology (Full-time/Part-time)
- Diploma in Theology (Full-time/Part-time)

In addition, there are extended certificate programs. The Bible Seminary of Hong Kong is an accredited member of the Asia Theological Association (ATA), and all its bachelor's and master's programs are accredited by ATA.

== See also ==
- Asia Theological Association
- List of evangelical seminaries and theological colleges
