= Southern Methodist Church =

Methodist denomination of Protestant Christianity

- Classification: Methodist
- Orientation: Holiness movement
- Theology: Wesleyan
- Origin: 1940
- Separated from: Methodist Episcopal Church, South (1940)
- Congregations: 73
- Members: 3,200
- Official website: thesmc.org

The Southern Methodist Church is a Methodist denomination of Protestant Christianity. The church maintains headquarters in Orangeburg, South Carolina.

The church was formed in 1940 by conservative members of the former Methodist Episcopal Church, South, which in 1939 had reunited with the Methodist Episcopal Church to form the Methodist Church.

In 2017, the Southern Methodist Church had approximately 85 churches and 3,200 members. Over 50% of the churches (47) are located in South Carolina. The denomination describes itself as seeking "to continue the doctrinal heritage of the Methodist Episcopal Church, South and to spread the message of salvation and Biblical holiness that John Wesley preached."

The denomination maintains Southern Methodist College, a four-year Bible college with a Christian liberal arts and ministerial program, in Orangeburg, South Carolina, near the church's headquarters. The denomination also supports foreign missionaries. The Woman's Missionary Society (WMS), the Epworth League children and youth program, and the Cartwright Men's Fellowship serve as specialized ministry and training efforts within the local churches and on the district and conference levels.

== See also ==
- Southern Congregational Methodist Church
- List of Methodist denominations
