= ECWA Theological Seminary =

Seminaries in Nigeria

- Type: Seminary
- Established: first in 1931
- Religious affiliation: Evangelical Church Winning All
- Location: Kagoro, Jos, Aba Nigeria Igbaja, Nigeria
- Website: https://www.jets.edu.ng/

ECWA Theological Seminary is an institution founded by ECWA for the training of its pastors and ministers. It is located in three different parts of Nigeria ( two in the north, one in the south).

The four ECWA Theological Seminaries are located in Kagoro, Igbaja Aba Nigeria, and Jos.

ECWA also have eight Bible colleges and fifteen theological training institutes.

== ECWA Theological Seminary, Kagoro ==
The ECWA Theological Seminary Kagoro, is a graduate school and seminary, located in Kagoro, Kaduna State, Nigeria.

The Seminary was founded in 1931 by the Evangelical Church Winning All (ECWA), previously known as the Evangelical Church of West Africa. It was not a Seminary when it was established in 1931. It was a Bible College. This college metamorphized in to Seminary later. The first Seminary of ECWA, and the First ECWA degree awarding Institution, is ECWA Theological Seminary, Igbaja, Kwara State, Nigeria

It is the oldest ECWA theological training institution.

=== Academics ===
ECWA Theological Seminary, Kagoro, offers a number of certificates, undergraduate degrees, and graduate degrees. The Seminary's degree programmes are accredited by, the University of Jos.

=== Facilities ===
The Seminary has a number of onsite facilities. Its Research Centre was founded to serve the Seminary and the wider academic community, with a particular focus on theological responses to conflict, reconciliation, and peace. The Seminary is also equipped with a library and a day care centre for the children of staff and students who study, teach, or work at the institution. Although the Seminary is the proprietor of the Seminary Staff School, the school has its own board of governors, and is developing its own site for classrooms.

=== Affiliations ===
ECWA Theological Seminary, Kagoro, offers an annual award for excellence in preaching named after the American theologian and author, Frederick Buechner. The Seminary is also a recognised partner of the United World Mission Overseas Council.

=== Kagoro Journal of Theology ===
The Kagoro Journal of Theology (KAJOT) is a bi-annual, multi-disciplinary journal, that is published by the ECWA Theological Seminary, Kagoro. First published in 2016, the journal has also hosted annual conferences at the Seminary.

== ECWA Theological Seminary, Igbaja, Kwara State, Nigeria ==
ECWA Theological Seminary, Igbaja started as a School of Prophets in 1918.

It was finally established a theological seminary on 12 February 1941, with eighteen students. The seminary trains men and women in biblical interpretation, with the goal of equipping them to become preachers.

It is located in Kwara State of Nigeria a Yoruba dominated area.

ECWA Theological Seminary Igbaja, located in Igbaja, Kwara State, Nigeria, the first ECWA Seminary in Nigeria and the first degree awarding Institutions of ECWA. ETSI is the only Seminary of ECWA that secure National University Commission (NUC) Accreditation for her Bachelor of Arts in Christian Religious Studies and the School is affiliated with the Premier University, the University of Ibadan. ECWA Theological Seminary is also accredited by Association of Christian Theological Education in Africa.

== Jos ECWA Theological Seminary ==
Jos ECWA Theological Seminary the most recent was established in 1980.

It is located in Plateau State in Nigeria, where ECWA headquarters is located.
