= China Bible Seminary =

- 中華神學院

Location
- Hong Kong Ngau Tam Mei, Yuen Long; HK
- Coordinates: 22°28′45″N 114°03′51″E

Information
- Type: Seminary
- Religious affiliation: Protestant
- Established: 1930-9-17
- President: Julie Lee Wu (李寶珠)
- Campus: Suburban
- Website: China Bible Seminary

The China Bible Seminary (CBS) is a Protestant school which trains pastors and leaders for the churches in Hong Kong and China, and missionaries for Asia and around the world. There are three campuses: the Main Campus in Yuen Long, New Territories, Hong Kong; the Tsim Sha Tsui Education Centre in Tsim Sha Tsui, Kowloon, Hong Kong; and the campus in North America.

== Programs ==
China Bible Seminary offers courses in full-time ministry, pastoral training and lay leader preparation. It trains pastors and lay leaders for the Church in Hong Kong and China, and missionaries who serve in Asia and around the world.

=== Full-time Ministry Courses (Full-time) ===
These courses include:

- Master of Divinity
- Bachelor of Theology
- Diploma of Theology
- Bachelor of Ministry

=== Pastoral Studies Courses (Part-time) ===
These courses include:

- Master of Divinity
- Master of Christian Ministry

=== Believers' Preparation Courses (Part-time) ===
These courses include:

- Bachelor of Biblical Studies
- Associate of Arts Degree in Biblical Studies
- Advanced Diploma of Biblical Studies
- Diploma of Biblical Studies

== School Logo ==
In 2014, forty years after reopening in Hong Kong, China Bible Seminary adopted a new logo. The Chinese character "中" in the name of the seminary is depicted with an upright cross and an open Bible, expressing the spirit of the seminary to "Exalt Christ and Preach the Word!". The colors used are dark brown and gray. The former represents wood and the latter represents stone, which are the main building materials used in the new temple revealed in Ezekiel 40-43. This expresses the school's wish to "become holy and useful to the Lord".

== Other information ==
- As of 2025, there are six core teachers and ten guest teachers in Hong Kong. The president is Rev. Dr. Julie Lee Wu, winner of the 2012 Scholar Leader of the Year Award.
- There are two campuses in Hong Kong: the Main Campus at 33 Ngau Tam Mei Road, Ngau Tam Mei, Yuen Long, N.T., Hong Kong; the Tsim Sha Tsui Education Centre at 3/F, Ashley Mansion, 10-14 Ashley Road, TST, Kowloon, Hong Kong.

== North America campus ==
The China Bible Seminary North America Ministries has offices in USA (Seattle) and Canada (Vancouver). It offers the Equipping Believers Certificate Program, and over ten courses. The faculty include 4 seminary lecturers and 3 guest lecturers.

== See also ==
- List of evangelical seminaries and theological colleges
