= Evangel Seminary =

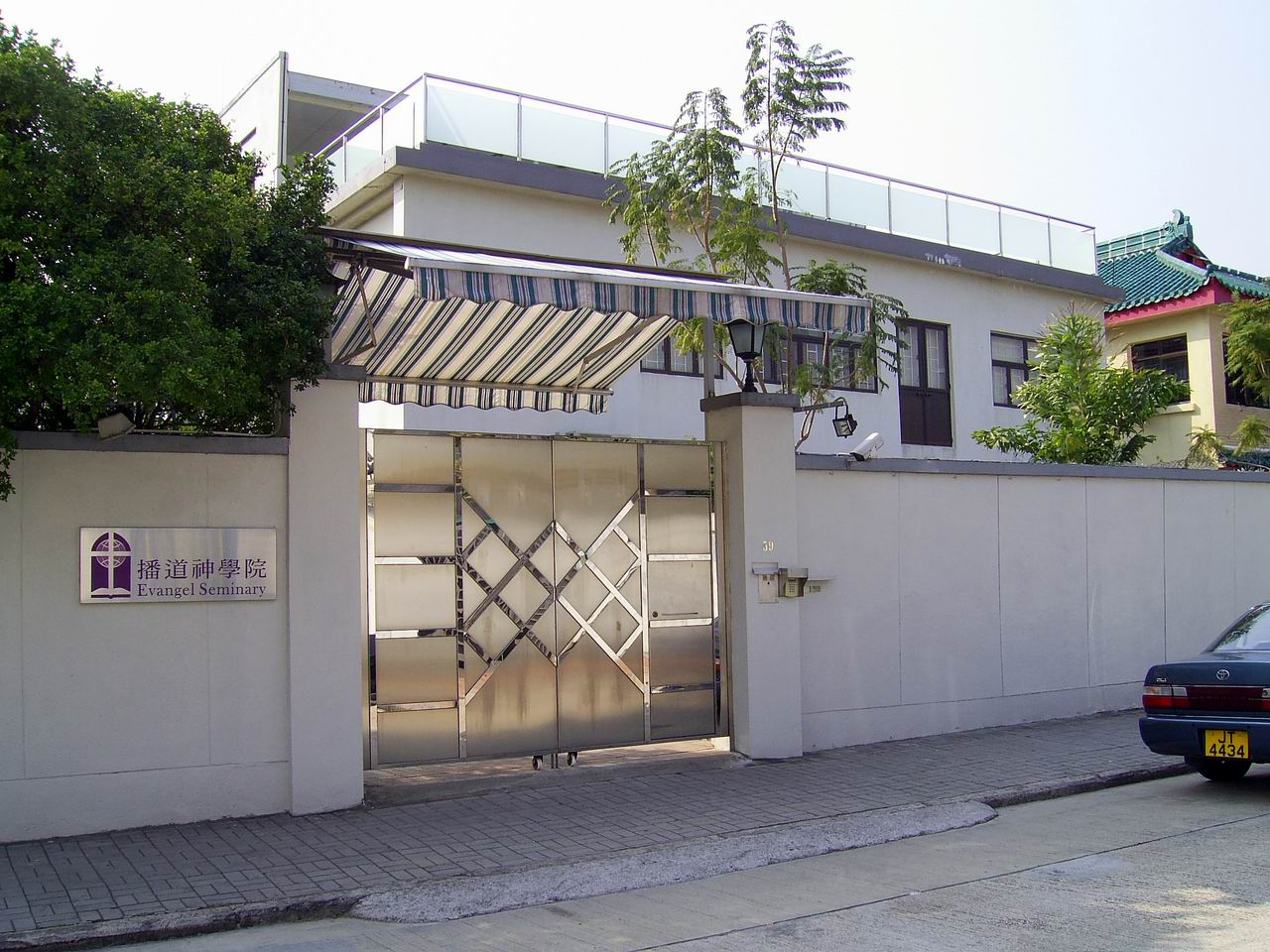
Evangel Seminary

Evangel Seminary (simplified Chinese: 播道神学院; traditional Chinese: 播道神學院; pinyin: Bōdào Shénxuéyuàn) is a theological institution located in Hong Kong, dedicated to training Christian leaders and providing theological education. Founded in Guangzhou in 1932, the school later moved to Hong Kong and has developed into a modern seminary offering a range of academic programs from certificate to doctoral levels. Evangel Seminary is a member of the Asia Theological Association, and its degree programs are accredited by the association.

== History ==
In 1932, the "Canton Bible Institute" was founded by Rev. Arthur G. Lindquist at the Henan district of Guangzhou, China.

In 1937, during the Second Sino-Japanese War, the Seminary moved to Hong Kong.

In 1939, the school was resumed in Guangzhou, with classes being offered simultaneously in Hong Kong as well.

In 1949, due to the China Civil War, the Guangzhou campus moved to Hong Kong, where classes were held at Hau Wong Road, Kowloon City and Kent Road, Kowloon Tong.

In 1957, the school bought the property at No.59 Cumberland Road, Kowloon Tong, which later became the official campus.

In 1965, the school upgraded the curriculum to a four-year Bachelor of Theology program, and was officially renamed "Evangel Theological College".

In 1982, the Master of Ministry program was added, and in 1992, the Master of Divinity program was added.

In 1996, the school was renamed as "Evangel Seminary".

In 2002, the school celebrated its 70th anniversary. The Master of Theology program was launched.

In the autumn of 2015, the Doctor of Ministry program was introduced.

At the end of July 2019, the school relocated to 38-46 Lansau Road, Phase 6, Mei Foo Sun Chuen, Lai Chi Kok (formerly the site of Deren College and the Kowloon West branch of the University of Hong Kong's School of Professional and Continuing Education).

On January 19, 2025, the Evangelical Seminary held a thanksgiving service to hand over the office of president. Dr. Man Kin-Foon took over as the seventh president of Evangel Seminary.

== Programs and students ==
Evangel Seminary offers a variety of programs tailored to different levels of theological education and ministry preparation, including

- Bachelor Degree and Advanced Diploma
  - BACS
  - AdvDipCS
- Postgraduate Diploma
  - PD in Biblical Studies
  - PD in Christian Education
  - PD in Worship Studies
- Master Degree
  - Master of Divinity
  - Master of Arts in Biblical Studies
  - Master of Arts in Christian Education
  - Master of Arts in Worship Studies
- Advanced Degree
  - Master of Theology
  - DMin
  - MAPM
  - Postgraduate Microcredential in Expository Preaching
- Joint Programmes between the UK Christian International Theological College and Hong Kong Evangel Seminary
  - Master of Christian Studies (UK) & Certificate in Biblical Studies (Advanced level) (UK)
  - Master of Divinity (UK)
  - MDiv-UK

So far, the Seminary has generated over one thousand graduates, serving in Hong Kong and overseas.

== Leadership and faculty ==
As of 2025, the president of Evangel Seminary is Dr. Man Kin-Foon, Jimmy, who succeeded Dr. Kwok Man-Chi and Dr. Yeung Wing-Sheung. The seminary is governed by a board of directors and supported by 16 faculty members with diverse theological backgrounds.

== Accreditation ==
Evangel Seminary is a member of the Asia Theological Association. The accredited programs include:

- Master of Arts in Biblical Studies
- Master of Divinity (Biblical Studies, Church Pastoral Ministry)
- Master of Theology (O.T., N.T., Theology & Ethics)
- Postgraduate Diploma in Christian Education (Childhood Education)
- Master of Arts in Christian Education (Childhood Education)
- Doctor of Ministry.

== Campus and facilities ==
The seminary's campus is near Exit B of the Mei Foo MTR station. It includes lecture halls, a 300-seat chapel, a library, and administrative offices, etc. And there is a large outdoor space of 7,000 sq. ft.

The school can be contacted by

- Address: G/F to 3/F, 38-46 Nassau Street, Mei Foo Sun Chuen, Kowloon, Hong Kong
- Telephone: 852-2337-0111
- Fax: 852-2337-0955 (Fax)
- Email: admoff@evs.edu.hk
- Website: https://www.evs.edu.hk/

== See also ==
- List of evangelical seminaries and theological colleges
- Evangelical Seminary
- Evangel Theological Seminary
