= Lutheran Theological Seminary (Hong Kong) =

Coordinates: 22.3851°N 114.1798°E

- 信義宗神學院
- Type: seminary
- Established: In 1977
- President: Tsang Ho-yin
- Location: 50 To Fung Shan, Shatin, New Territories, Hong Kong
- Campus: Suburban area
- Affiliations: Lutheran Church–Hong Kong Synod
- Website: https://www.lts.edu/eng/

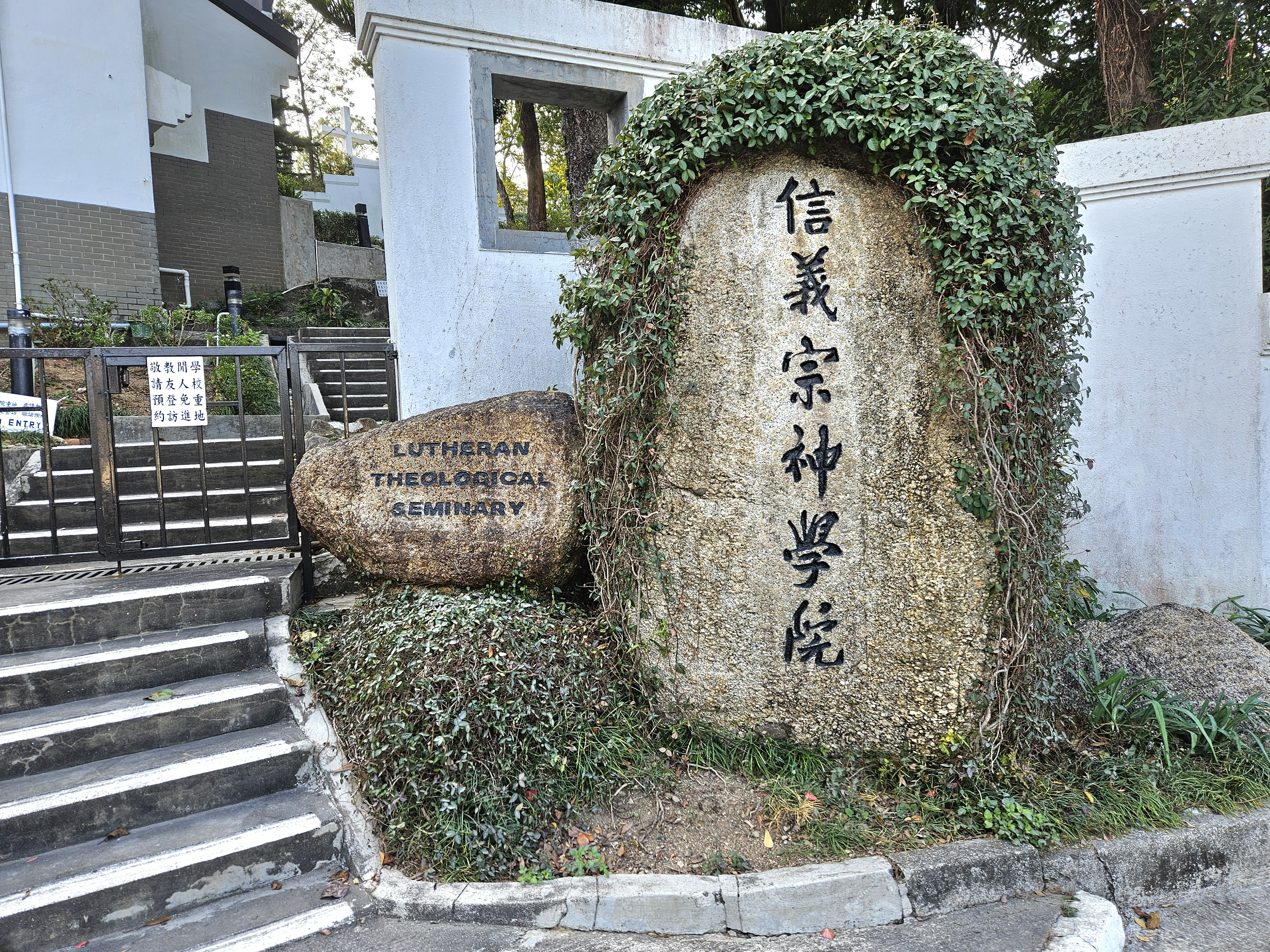
Seminary brand

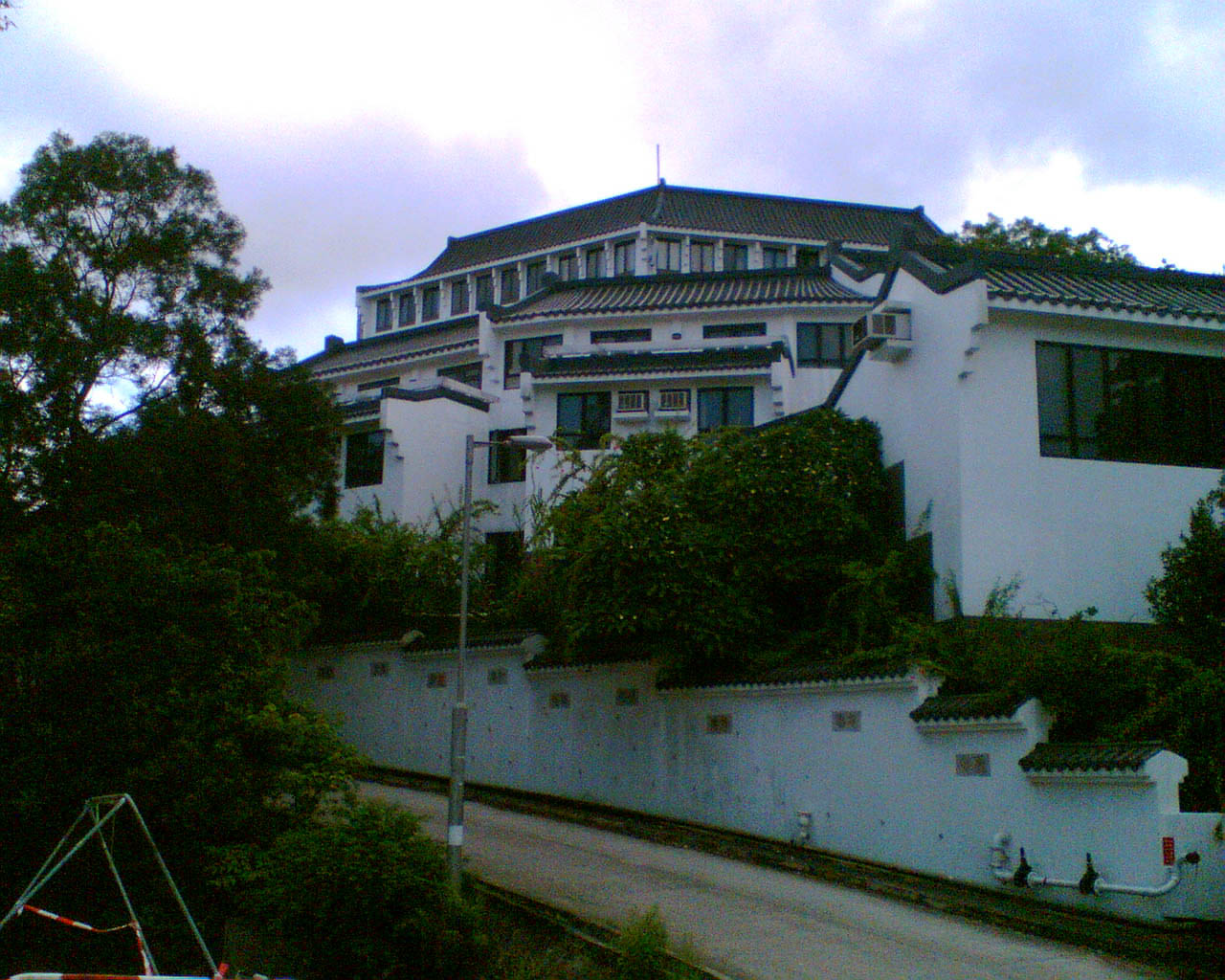
Lutheran Theological Seminary (Hong Kong)

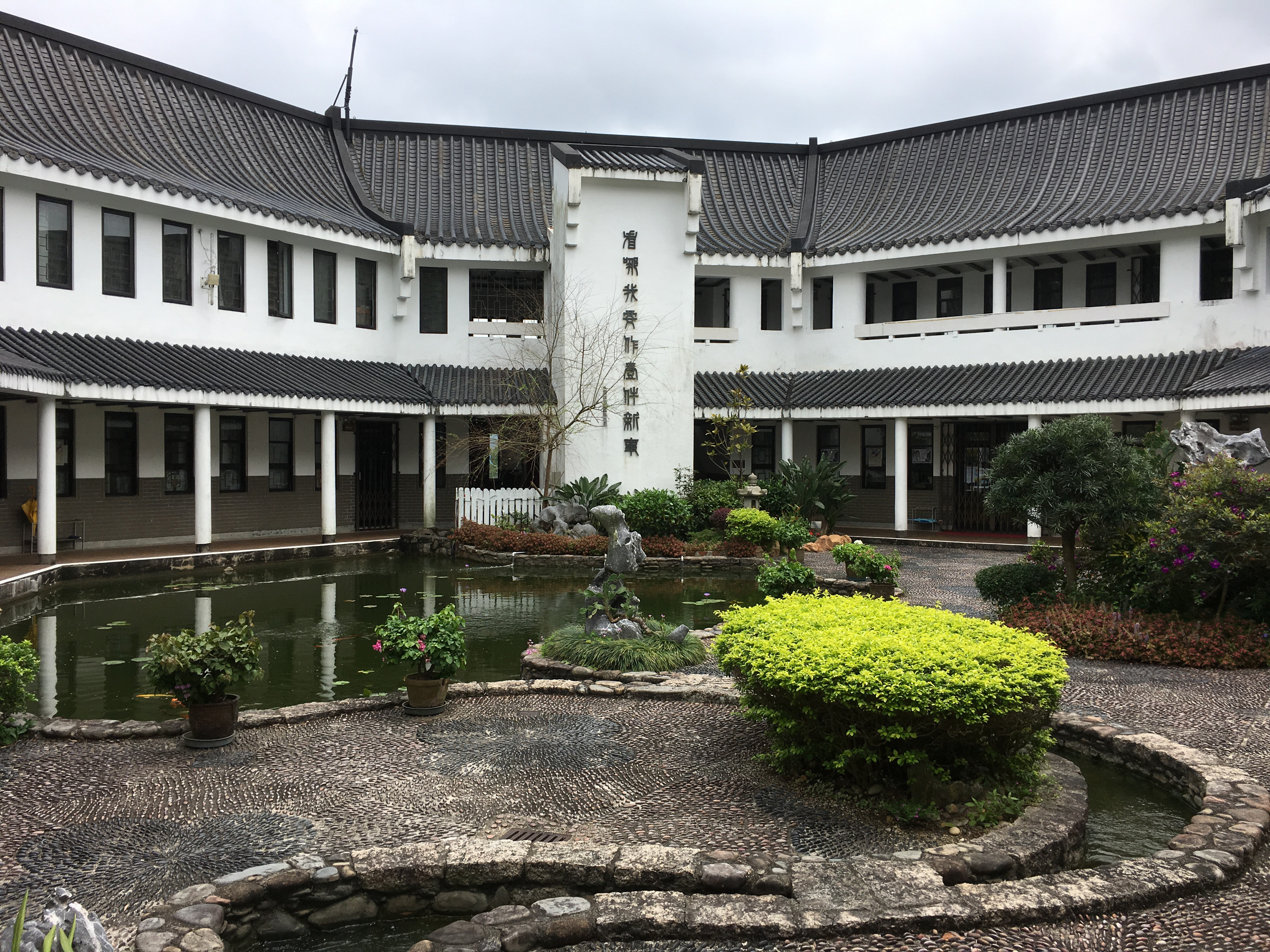
On the wall of the seminary's inner courtyard, inscribed in seal script are the words "看啊我要作一件新事 (Behold, I am going to do a new thing)" (Isaiah 43:19).

The Lutheran Theological Seminary (LTS; Chinese: 信義宗神學院) is a Christian college located at Tao Fung Shan, Hong Kong. With a history tracible to 1913, Lutheran Theological Seminary was jointly established in 1977 by the Evangelical Lutheran Church of Hong Kong, the Hong Kong Synod of the Chinese Rhenish Mission, the Tsung Tsin Mission of Hong Kong and the Taiwan Lutheran Church.

== History ==
In 1913, the Central China Union Theological Seminary (Chinese: 華中聯合信義神學院) was founded in Shekow, Hubei, China, by Hauge’s Synod Mission, American Lutheran Mission, Norwegian Missionary Society and Finnish Missionary Society. The first President was Dr. O. R. Wold, an American Norwegian.

In 1923, the school was renamed "the Lutheran Theological Seminary" (LTS, 信義神學院).

At the end of 1948, due to the turbulent situation in mainland China, the seminary relocated south to Hong Kong. 41 students resumed classes in Tao Fung Shan Christian Centre.

In 1954, the Evangelical Lutheran Church of Hong Kong was established, overseeing a total of 15 churches.

In 1955, the school bought lands in Pak Tin village, Shatin and built a permanent campus there.

In 1963, the seminary became the theological education institution of the Evangelical Lutheran Church of Hong Kong.

In 1971, the first Chinese President of the Lutheran Theological Seminary, Dr. Andrew Hsiao, was appointed.

In 1977, a united Lutheran theological seminary was established by the Evangelical Lutheran Church of Hong Kong, the Hong Kong Synod of the Chinese Rhenish Church, the Evangelical Tsung Tsin Mission of Hong Kong and the Evangelical Lutheran Church of Taiwan. The Chinese name of the Seminary was renamed as "信義宗神學院". Its inaugural opening ceremony was held on September 3.

In 1987, seven acres of land located at Tao Fung Shan was donated to the seminary by the Christian Mission to the Buddhists, for building a new campus.

In late 1992, the Lutheran Theological Seminary relocated to the new campus on the summit of Tao Fung Shan. The dedication ceremony was held on 29 November.

In 2006, Lutheran Theological Seminary received accreditation from the Asia Theological Association.

By 2008, the school had over 300 students, over 20 teachers, and a library with over 80,000 books, the largest collection among the Chinese seminaries in the world.

== Programs ==
The seminary offers doctoral, master's, bachelor's and diploma programs, all recognized by the four theological associations listed in the next section.

- Doctoral Programs: Doctor of Theology, Doctor of Ministry
- Master's Programs: Master of Divinity, Three-Year Master of Divinity, Two-Year Master of Divinity, Master of Arts (Theology), Master of Arts (Missions), Master of Arts (Pastoral Counseling), Master of Arts (Spirituality), Master of Arts (Ministry)
- Bachelor's Programs: Bachelor of Theology, Bachelor of Christian Education
- Diploma Programs: Diploma of Theology, Advanced Diploma in Theological Studies

Other programs:

- Master of Christian Studies
- Associate of Christian Studies
- Certificate in Believers' Theology
- Diploma in Believers' Theology
- Diploma in Workplace Believers' Leadership

== Other information ==
Lutheran Theological Seminary (Hong Kong) has won membership, accreditation and endorsement from the following organizations:

- Association for Theological Education in South East Asia (ATESEA).
- South East Asia Graduate School of Theology (SEAGST),
- Association for the Promotion of Chinese Theological Education (APCTE)
- Hong Kong Theological Education Association (HKTEA).
- Member of Asia Theological Association (ATA).

The seminary's teachers and students come from Hong Kong, Europe, America and Southeast Asia. They also have communication with churches on the China mainland.

Address : 50 To Fung Shan Road, Shatin, N.T., Hong Kong

== See also ==
- Evangelical Lutheran Church of Hong Kong
- List of evangelical seminaries and theological colleges
- Tao Fong Shan
- China Lutheran Seminary
