= Southern Methodist College =

Private college in Orangeburg, South Carolina

Coordinates: 33.4810°N 80.8602°W

- Type: Private liberal arts college
- Established: 1956
- Accreditation: Association of Christian Schools International
- Religious affiliation: Southern Methodist Church
- Location: Orangeburg, South Carolina, United States
- Website: smcollege.edu

Southern Methodist College (SMC) is a private four-year liberal arts college in Orangeburg, South Carolina. It is affiliated with the Southern Methodist Church.

== History ==
Southern Methodist College was founded in 1956 as a private Methodist school in Greenville, South Carolina after the Southern Methodist Church saw a need to establish an institution to train its ministers. In 1961, Southern Methodist College had sixty-one students enrolled. The campus was moved to the city of Orangeburg, South Carolina, on the estate of Frederick A. Adden.

== Library ==
The library of Southern Methodist College "holds 21,743 titles, 60 serial subscriptions, and 171 audiovisual materials."

== Admissions ==
Southern Methodist College has an open admissions policy. Its tuition rates for full-time students are US$6800.

== Academics ==
Southern Methodist College offers a one-year diploma in Biblical Studies, Associate of Arts degrees in General and Religious Education, a Bachelor of Arts in Bible and Christian Ministries, and a Master of Arts in Biblical Studies.

== See also ==
- Breckbill Bible College
