= Central Taiwan Theological Seminary =

Central Taiwan Theological Seminary (Chinese: 中台神學院)
- Type: Private seminary
- Established: 1951年
- President: David Chao
- Location: No. 36, Linsen Rd., West District, Taichung City, Republic of China (Taiwan)
- Website: www.ctts.org.tw (in Chinese)

The Central Taiwan Theological Seminary, or Chung Tai Theological Seminary, is a Protestant school in Taichung City, Taiwan. Founded in 1951, the school is now an accredited member of the Asia Theological Association. It offered programs ranging from certificates to doctorate degrees.

== History ==
In October 1951, the Central Taiwan Theological Seminary was founded by the Far East Missionary Society (now the International Missionary Society) in Taichung City Taiwan, with Pastor Chi Ai-mu as its first president. The seminary initially rented two villas at No. 24, Taiping Road. Six teachers and thirty-three new students attended the opening ceremony.

In 1952, with the assistance of Taichung Mayor Yang Chi-hsien, the seminary purchased 2.9 mu of land in Lane 45, Section 2, Shuangshi Road for its campus. Construction began with a donation from Bob Pierce, founder of the World Vision. The building was completed in 1953 and named "Pierce Hall" in his honor.

In 1972, approximately 2,500 ping (approximately 667 square meters) of land on Sanmin Road was sold to raise funds for the construction of classrooms, an auditorium, and dormitories.

In 1978, Pastor Su Hsiao-hsing became the first Taiwanese president; prior to that, the position was held by Western missionaries.

In 1980, the Taichung City Government acquired 517 ping (approximately 343 square meters) of land to widen Jinnan Street.

In 1989, the Taichung City Government acquired 365 ping (approximately 243 square meters) of land to develop Jinxin Street. In the same year the school's Bachelor degrees were recognized by the Asia Theological Association.

On March 12, 1999, the International Missionary Society donated 2/3 of the 5,000 ping of the campus land to the school.

In 2006, the Shuangshi Road campus was sold to Yimin Construction, and the school moved to a temporary campus on Linsen Road in the following year.

In 2008, the school purchased 18,000 ping (approximately 3,333 square meters) of land in Tanzih District for the construction of future school buildings.

In 2019, the seminary opened the Central Taiwan Theological Seminary North America Office (CTTSNA) in the United States.

In 2020, The school launched its pastoral doctoral program.

In 2021, the environmental impact assessment review meeting for the development of the new campus in Tanzih was approved.

Over the past 70 years, Central Taiwan Theological Seminary has trained about 1,000 workers, who serve in churches and organizations throughout Taiwan. Some pastors have also gone to serve in churches or evangelistic organizations in Southeast Asia, Japan, Europe, and America.

== Programs ==
The programs offer by Central Taiwan Theological Seminary include:

- Bachelor of Theology
- Master of Divinity
- Master of Church Ministry
- Master of Pastoral Counseling
- Doctor of Ministry (Provisional)

They are all accredited by the Asia Theological Association.

== Other information ==
- Currently there are 7 full-time teachers and 18 part-time teachers in Central Taiwan Theological Seminary. The president is David Chao.
- The school is an Accredited Member of Asia Theological Association.
- It offers programs at various levels, ranging from certificates to doctorate degrees.
- The school library currently has over 50,000 printed books in Chinese, English, and Japanese; and 1,008 e-books in Chinese and Western languages. In addition, there are journals and multimedia materials, etc.
- The Central Taiwan Theological Seminary North America is located in Mission Viejo, CA. It supports the mission of the school and provides seminary student tuition assistance.

== See also ==
- Holy Light Theological Seminary,
- China Evangelical Seminary,
- List of evangelical seminaries and theological colleges
