= Chinese Mission Seminary =

Christian theological school in Hong Kong

Coordinates: 22°26′18″N 114°00′10″E

- 中國宣道神學院
- Type: seminary
- Established: 1987
- President: Janet Chan
- Location: 130 Hung Uk, Yuen Long, N. T., Hong Kong
- Campus: suburban
- Website: www.cms-en.org

The Chinese Mission Seminary (CMS) is a theological school founded in Hong Kong in 1978 by Jonathan Chao with the vision of evangelization, kingdomization, and Christianization. It is an interdenominational Christian seminary offering programs at certificate, diploma, bachelor and master degree levels.

Chinese Mission Seminary is a member of the Hong Kong Theological Education Association and an associate member of the Asia Theological Association.

== History ==
In 1978, Jonathan Chao (1938-2004) founded the China Church Research Center in Hong Kong. In 1984, during a retreat, the Center's staff decided to establish a seminary based on the "three-pronged vision" of evangelization, kingdomization and Christianization. Its long-term goal was to train missionaries and researchers for missions in China. Discipleship training courses began in 1985.

In 1987, the Chinese Mission Seminary, an interdenominational seminary, was established at a Christian camp in Kau To Village, Sha Tin, Hong Kong . Rev. Jonathan Chao was the founder and first president of the school. In September 1994, the school relocated to the New Light Camp in Ma Wan. On July 28, 1997, the school moved to its current location in Hung Uk, Yuen Long.

In 2014, the school system was changed from three semesters per year to two semesters per year, each lasting fourteen weeks. On September 24, 2023, Janet Chan was inaugurated as the President of Chinese Mission Seminary.

== Academics ==
=== Programs ===
The the Chinese Mission Seminary is an interdenominational Christian seminary offering programs at certificate, diploma, bachelor and master degree levels. The school offers the following programs:

- Master of Divinity (four-year)
- Bachelor of Theology (three-year)
- Postgraduate Diploma in Christian Studies (one-year)
- Diploma in Christian Studies (one-year, part-time)
- Bachelor of Christian Studies (part-time)
- Postgraduate Diploma in Christian Studies (part-time)
- Diploma in Christian Studies (part-time

=== Accreditation ===
Chinese Mission Seminary is a member of the Hong Kong Theological Education Association and an associate member of the Asia Theological Association.

=== Students ===
There are about 50 students graduating in a year.
