= Igbaja =

- Town
- Location in Nigeria
- Coordinates: 8°23′0″N 4°53′0″E
- Country: Nigeria
- State: Kwara State
- Local Government Area: Ifelodun
- Time zone: UTC+1 (WAT)

Igbaja is a community in Ifelodun Local Government Area, Kwara State, Nigeria, at an elevation of 349 m. It is about 40 km southeast of Ilorin, and is in Igbomina country. The Ilorin Provincial Gazetteer (1918) dates the settlement of Igbaja as late 17th or early 18th century, while the Igbaja District Gazetteer (1933–35) puts it about 1750 AD.

The wet season lasts from April to October, with 50–100 cm of rain. In the dry season from November to March there is 0–13 cm of rain. The natural landscape is Southern Guinea savanna, or open woodland. The soils are deep and red, often with clayey subsoils, suitable for pottery making.

The traditional ruler is the Elese of Igbaja, Alhaji Ahmed Babalola Awuni Arepo III, who celebrated his 79th birthday in April 2009, attended by the Kwara State Governor, Doctor Bukola Saraki. In August 2009 he advised Muslims to observe the rules of the holy month of Ramadan, and to practice love and tolerance. Notable Luminariea from this town are numerous. Some of them are Late Alhaji Chief Raimi Dosunmu (Aro), Late Alhaji Chief Disu Dosunmu, Alhaji Chief Sadiku Oke-owo Adigun Baba Adinni of Ajumose Mosque Oshodi, Chief (Dr.) Abdul Raheem Oladimeji OFR, Founder Al-Hikmah University, Ilorin; scholar Sheikh Abdul Rahman Muhammadul Awwal Owolabi (K.B.N.M.T.I.L), Chief Alhaji Abdul Raheem Aroyehun Zubair, Chief Abdul Kareem Ikolaba, etc.

There have in the past been conflicts in the area between local farmers and nomadic pastoralists.

The Evangelical Church of West Africa now known as the Evangelical Church Winning All (ECWA) established a theological seminary in Igbaja on 12 February 1941, with eighteen students. The seminary trains men and women in biblical interpretation, with the goal of equipping them to become preachers.

== Climate ==
Igbaja has a tropical wet and dry or savanna climate and is located at an altitude of 394.97 meters (1295.83 feet) above sea level (Classification: Aw). The district's annual temperature of 30.03°C (86.05°F) is 0.57% higher than the national average for Nigeria. Igbaja experiences 150.83 rainy days (41.32% of the time) annually and average precipitation of 103.13 millimeters (4.06 inches).
