= Carolina Graduate School of Divinity =

Location
- 2400 Old Chapman Street; Greensboro, North Carolina 27403; United States
- Coordinates: 36.04430°N 79.82346°W

Information
- Type: Graduate School
- Established: 1994 (unlinked 2003)
- Status: Closed
- President: Dr. Frank P. Scurry
- Vice President: Dr. Terry W. Eddinger
- Faculty: 12
- Enrollment: 100 (May 2014)
- Campus type: Traditional
- Color(s): Blue and Gold
- Website: carolinagrad.edu

The Carolina Graduate School of Divinity was a divinity school in the evangelical tradition located in Greensboro, North Carolina. It opened as a branch campus of Houston Graduate School of Theology in 1994. The campus unlinked from HGST in 2003 and became Carolina Evangelical Divinity School. It was renamed Carolina Graduate School of Divinity in 2010 and in June 2016 ceased operations due to financial stress. The institution's official records are now held at the Houston Graduate School of Theology.

== Campuses ==
The Carolina Graduate School of Divinity was located in Greensboro, North Carolina after several years on the campus of John Wesley University in High Point, North Carolina. Courses were also taught at Randolph Community College in Asheboro, North Carolina as well as at River Oaks Community Church in the Winston-Salem, North Carolina area.

== Accreditation ==
The Carolina Graduate School of Divinity was accredited by the leading USDE and CHEA recognized accreditor of theological institutions, the Commission on Accrediting of the Association of Theological Schools in the United States and Canada. CGSD maintained national accreditation throughout its history.

== Administration and Faculty ==
The Carolina Graduate School of Divinity was led by Dr. Frank P. Scurry, President and Dr. Terry W. Eddinger, Vice President for Academics. The residential faculty was robust, holding graduate and doctoral degrees from the nation's most prestigious seminaries and universities. The Doctor of Ministry program welcomed several reputable Visiting Professors in the later stages of its development. Internationally recognized evangelical scholars taught several courses at the divinity school including Dr. Douglas Moo of Wheaton College, Dr. Kent Hughes of Westminster Seminary, Dr. Bill Mounce of Biblical Training, and Dr. Walter Kaiser Jr. from Gordon-Conwell Seminary.

== Degree Programs ==
The Carolina Graduate School of Divinity offered four degree programs: Master of Arts in Ministry (48 semester hours), Master of Arts in Biblical Studies (48 semester hours), Master of Divinity (M.Div.) (84 semester hours), and Doctor of Ministry (D.Min.) (30 semester hours).

== Closing ==
Citing the economic recession, the board of trustees voted to close the school on June 30, 2016. The divinity school voluntarily withdrew their accreditation from the Association of Theological Schools (ATS) on the same date and released teach-out plans to assist current students in completing their degrees. Due to the relationship dating back to CGSD's founding, all of the historical documents and student records are now held by the Houston Graduate School of Theology. On another front, a friendship years in the making was formed between the Carolina Graduate School of Divinity, led by Pres. Scurry, and the Charlotte Christian College and Theological Seminary, led by Pres. Eddie Grigg. Much of the CGSD Faculty joined the Doctoral Faculty of the Charlotte Theological Seminary, and some CGSD students transferred to CTS as well.
