= Western Reformed Seminary =

Seminary of the Bible Presbyterian Church in Washington, US

Coordinates: 47°15′48″N 122°26′53″W

- Motto: Personal Touch... Pastoral Vision!
- Type: Seminary
- Established: 1983
- Affiliations: Association of Reformed Theological Seminaries
- President: Tito Lyro
- Faculty: 10
- Administrative staff: 3
- Location: Tacoma, Washington, United States
- Website: www.wrs.edu

Western Reformed Seminary is a seminary of the Bible Presbyterian Church located in Tacoma, Washington. The school provides theological training for ministers, missionaries, teachers, and interested Christians. The president is Tito Lyro. Western Reformed Seminary was founded in 1983.

== Programs ==
Bachelor and master's degrees are offered in divinity (especially for ministers), biblical studies, theological studies, church ministry, and biblical counseling.

WRS is a member of the Association of Reformed Theological Seminaries is certified by the Association of Certified Biblical Counselors and by the Association of Christian Schools International.

== Publications ==
The seminary publishes a theological journal, WRS Journal.
