= South London Christian College =

- Location: London
- Country: England
- Denomination: Interdenominational
- Website: http://www.globalinstitute.org.uk/

History
- Founded: September 1991
- Founder: Dr Femi Olowo

South London Christian College an international college with a vision for training leaders from the Global South was founded in 1991 in Clapham, London, England. It then relocated in 2006 to Grove Park, London, until its closure in October 2012. Training resumed in 2013 under the new auspices of Global Christian Institute.

== History ==
Students of South London Christian College over the years have come from some 45 different nations of the world and over 1000 have graduated on completion of their studies. Programmes offered over the years included full-time, part-time and distance learning from certificate to postgraduate degrees. Study areas included theology, ministerial studies, missions, Christian counselling and Christian music and worship. The vision of SLCC: 'inspire hearts and educate minds'.

The college offered practical training and assessments which included activities such as church placements. Students also went on Israel Bible tours and international missions trips to countries such as Belgium, Moldova, Pakistan, India, Uganda, Kenya, Zambia, Zimbabwe, South Africa, Ghana and the Gambia.

The college was initially registered with Department for Education and Skills (United Kingdom) (DfES) in 2005, then it was accredited in 2009 by an OfSTED-appointed organisation, Accreditation Service for International Colleges (ASIC) and was A rated. Following the government's 2011 guidelines for colleges to have governmental educational oversight, SLCC passed an inspection with Bridge Schools Inspectorate (BSI), which took over the role of ASIC.

In October 2012, South London Christian College ceased operating and running programmes due to financial reasons. Training resumed in 2013 under the new name of Global Christian Institute (GCI).

== Training Mandate ==
The mandate of GCI is to deliver bespoke short-term or long-term leadership training in local church hubs at the behest of local church pastors around the UK and Europe. Recent training programmes have been designed and delivered for the following churches:

- Alive Chapel International, Tottenham, London (2013). (Host: Pastor Samuel Bentil)
- The Overcomers Christian Fellowship International, Plymouth (2013-2015). (Host: Reverend Michael Ileladewa)
- Latter Rain Bethany Church, Peckham, London (2013–present). (Host: Bishop C L Green)
- AFMIM Croydon, Surrey (2015-2017). (Host: Reverend Anthony Chirara)
- La Gloria Del Shaddai (Spanish) Church, Camberwell, London (2015-2017). (Host: Pastor Claudia Galeano)
- Soul Winning Pentecostal Ministries, Navan (nr Dublin), Ireland (2017–present). (Host: Pastor Michael Arowolo)

== Leadership ==
- 1991–2012 - Dr Femi Olowo
- 1991-2012 - Dr Frank Ofosu-Appiah
- 1996–2012 - Dr David Curtis
- 2006–2012 - Dr Meyer van Rensburg
- 2006–2012 - Mercia MacDonald
