= International Bible College =

College in San Antonio, Texas

Coordinates: 29.465634°N 98.585268°W

International Bible Church
- Type: Private College
- Active: 1942–Open
- President: David W. Cook
- Location: San Antonio, Texas, US
- Campus: Urban, 5 acres (0.020 km^{2})
- Colors: Gold and Blue
- Website: www.ibctx.org

International Bible College was a Christian Bible College located on 5 acres (0.020 km^{2}) northwest of historic downtown San Antonio, Texas, U.S. Founded by Leonard Coote in 1942, International Bible College was among the oldest Christian Colleges in Texas and the Southwest before it closed in 2010.

== History ==
International Bible College (now defunct) in San Antonio, was founded by Rev. Leonard W. Coote, a Oneness Pentecostal missionary to Japan. In 1942, when World War II temporarily halted his missionary efforts with the Japan Apostolic Mission, Coote moved to San Antonio and began Emmanuel Gospel Tabernacle (now Destiny Church) as well as IBC. He had previously established a Bible training school for native workers in Ikoma, Japan, and wanted to build a similar Bible training center in the United States. The school, chartered as a nonprofit institution and dependent on private contributions for support, was situated on a ten-acre campus atop "Hallelujah Hill," overlooking San Antonio.

=== Peak enrollment and development ===
In 1965, the campus included 14 buildings; the library contained 3,000 volumes. By 1967 the campus included 19 buildings; that number grew to 27 by 1995. Curriculum offerings in 1967 were a 2½-year course leading to a Christian worker's certificate, a three-year ministerial diploma course, and two four-year bible college courses-one leading to the Bachelor of Theology degree (BTh) and the other to the Bachelor of Religious Education degree (BRE). Eventually IBC came to consider itself a "nonsectarian school", and at the time of its closing was affiliated with the Oral Roberts University Educational Fellowship (ORUEF). Enrollment in 2001 was 91 full-time-equivalent students; faculty numbered 21. David W. Cook served as president until 2010.

=== Loss of certification and decline ===
IBC was never accredited by a regional accrediting body but did obtain a certificate of authority from the State of Texas authorizing it to grant bachelor's degrees in 1976. In the mid 1980s IBC began to face scrutiny from the Texas Higher Education Coordinating Board and was required to gain accreditation from an accrediting body recognized by the State of Texas. When the school failed to gain accreditation it was stripped of its ability to grant degrees when its final certification expired on March 8, 1992. The school was forced to change its name from International Bible College to International Bible Center. Enrollment steadily declined after the certification was lost until the school closed in the fall of 2010.

== Degrees ==
Throughout most of its history IBC offered two baccalaureate degrees: the Bachelor of Theology degree and the Bachelor of Religious Education degree. A total of 120 semester hours were to be completed, and for many years a 10,000 word thesis was required. In addition it offered a three-year ministerial diploma and one year Bible course. When it lost its ability to grant degrees in 1992 it began offering a Certificate of Biblical Studies, which required 64 semester hours, and a Diploma of Advanced Biblical Studies, requiring 128 semester hours.
