= Bridge Schools Inspectorate =

British schools inspection agency

Bridge Schools Inspectorate was a schools inspection agency approved by the British Government to carry out inspections of certain independent schools on behalf of the Secretary of State in the Department for Education (DfE). The agency was approved in 2008 and operated within section 162 (A) of the Education Act 2002. Schools within the BSI mandate are designated independent schools within membership of the Christian Schools Trust (CST) or the Association of Muslim Schools. As of September 2009, 55 schools in the UK that provide a distinctive religious curriculum alongside secular studies, fell within the remit of the BSI.

The work of the BSI, which was monitored by Ofsted, was to report whether the schools fulfill the government's requirements and whether its religious content conformed to the requirements of their religious associations to the Department for Education. Inspections were carried out by retired HMI schools inspectors.

It ceased operating on 30 September 2015, following a damning OFSTED report into their work.
