= Bingham University =

Private university in Nigeria

- Official logo of Bingham University
- Motto: Mission for Service
- Type: Private
- Established: 2005
- Affiliations: National Universities Commission (NUC)
- Endowment: Not available
- Chancellor: Prof. Andrew Haruna, FNAL, FLAN, FCPA, FSPMDP
- Vice-Chancellor: Prof. Haruna Kuje Ayuba
- Academic staff: Approx. 100 (5:1 student-staff ratio)
- Students: 500–999 (2024 estimate)
- Location: Km 26 Abuja-Keffi Expressway, Kodape, Karu, Nasarawa State, Nigeria; 8.8497°N 7.6525°E
- Campus: Urban
- Website: www.binghamuni.edu.ng

Bingham University is a private university in Karu, Nasarawa State, Nigeria, located 26 kilometers from Abuja, the national capital. Founded in 2005 by the National Universities Commission (NUC), it began lectures in 2006 and has grown to offer diverse undergraduate and postgraduate programs across 12 faculties.

The university's permanent campus, occupied since 3 March 2008, is in New Karu, with its teaching hospital in Jos, Plateau State. With a selective admission rate (50–59%) and a student-staff ratio of 5:1, Bingham has graduated over 7,000 students by 2024, emphasizing academic excellence and practical skills.

== History ==
Bingham University was established on 5 January 2005 after receiving its NUC charter, with planning starting in 2003 to address Nigeria's need for quality private education. Lectures began in 2006, and the university moved to its permanent campus in New Karu on 3 March 2008.

In 2024, it earned GFGP Gold Tier certification from the Global Grant Community and the African Academy of Sciences for research excellence. Recent milestones include a planned Master of Public Health (MPH) program with the Liverpool School of Tropical Medicine (LSTM) and new programs like B.Sc. Supply Chain Management.

== Academic programs ==
Bingham University offers undergraduate and postgraduate programs across 12 faculties, supported by a 5:1 student-staff ratio. Programs are accredited by the NUC and professional bodies like the Medical and Dental Council of Nigeria. Below is a summary of faculties and programs:

Faculty	Undergraduate Programs	Postgraduate Programs
Faculty of Clinical Sciences	MBBS Medicine, B.Sc. Nursing, B.Sc. Radiography	M.Sc. Public Health, Ph.D. Anatomy
Faculty of Allied Health Sciences	B.Sc. Anatomy, B.Sc. Physiology, B.Sc. Medical Laboratory Science	M.Sc. Physiology, Ph.D. Microbiology
Faculty of Pharmaceutical Sciences	B.Pharm. Pharmacy, B.Sc. Pharmacology	M.Sc. Pharmaceutical Microbiology
Faculty of Science and Technology	B.Sc. Computer Science, B.Sc. Cyber Security, B.Sc. Physics	M.Sc. Environmental Chemistry, Ph.D. Biochemistry
Faculty of Law	LL.B. Bachelor of Law	None
Faculty of Environmental Sciences	B.Sc. Architecture, B.Sc. Quantity Surveying, B.Sc. Estate Management	M.Sc. Architecture
Faculty of Arts	B.A. English, B.A. Philosophy, B.A. Religious Studies	M.Sc. English & Literary Studies, Ph.D. English
Faculty of Social Sciences	B.Sc. Sociology, B.Sc. Political Science, B.Sc. Mass Communication	M.Sc. Mass Communication, Ph.D. Economics
Faculty of Administration	B.Sc. Accounting, B.Sc. Business Administration	M.Sc. Accounting, Ph.D. Business Administration
Faculty of Education	B.Sc. Guidance and Counseling, B.Sc. Psychology	None
Faculty of Communication	B.Sc. Mass Communication	M.Sc. Mass Communication
Faculty of Entrepreneurship	B.Sc. Entrepreneurship, B.Sc. Supply Chain Management	None

New programs introduced in 2024 include B.Sc. Procurement Management and B.Sc. Supply Chain Management, reflecting a focus on entrepreneurship. Postgraduate admission requires a Second Class (Lower Division) degree or a Postgraduate Diploma with a CGPA of 3.00.

== Campus and Facilities ==
The main campus in New Karu, Nasarawa State, is located along the Abuja-Keffi Expressway in an urban setting. Facilities include a library, sports complex, lecture halls, and on-campus accommodation for all students, enforced by a residential policy requiring exit permits. A location map highlights its proximity to Abuja:

=== Bingham University Teaching Hospital ===
Bingham University Teaching Hospital

Geography
- Location: Jos, Plateau State, Nigeria
- Coordinates: 9.9324°N 8.8776°E

Organisation
- Care system: Private
- Type: Teaching
- Affiliated university: Bingham University

Services
- Emergency department: Yes
- Beds: 400
- Speciality: Multi-specialty

History
- Opened: 1959

Links
- Website: www.bhuth.org.ng
- Lists: Hospitals in Nigeria

Bingham University Teaching Hospital (BUTH), originally Evangel Hospital, was established in 1959 in Jos, Plateau State. A 400-bed facility, it supports medical training and research for the Faculty of Clinical Sciences, offering specialties like ENT, surgery, pediatrics, obstetrics and gynecology, ophthalmology, vesicovaginal fistula (VVF) surgery, and HIV care with antiretroviral treatment. BUTH trains medical interns and resident doctors, serving as a regional healthcare hub.

== Research and Partnerships ==
Bingham University has strengthened its research profile, earning GFGP Gold Tier certification in 2024 from the Global Grant Community and the African Academy of Sciences. The Faculty of Clinical Sciences hosted the 2nd Scientific MBBS Poster Presentation in 2024, highlighting student research. A 2024 MoU with the Nigerian Press Council (NPC) enhanced media training for the Mass Communication department. The university is developing a joint Master of Public Health (MPH) program with the Liverpool School of Tropical Medicine (LSTM), set to launch in 2026. The Department of Political Science collaborated with the Ambassador Bulus Lolo Centre for a Mock African Union Summit in 2024, fostering diplomatic skills.

== Administration ==
The university's leadership includes:

- Chancellor: Prof. Andrew Haruna, FNAL, FLAN, FCPA, FSPMDP

- Vice-Chancellor: Prof. Haruna Kuje Ayuba (appointed 2023)

- Former Vice-Chancellor: Prof. A.T. Gana (deceased, first VC)

- Pro-Chancellor: Prof. Gwamna Dogara Far

- Registrar: Mr. Daburi Bello Misal

The university adheres to NUC standards, ensuring academic and administrative integrity.

== Student Life ==
Bingham University maintains a disciplined environment with mandatory on-campus residency and exit permits for leaving campus. Facilities include a library, sports complex, and student organizations, fostering community engagement. The 2024/2025 admission cycle, opened on 2 September 2024, requires a UTME score of 150 and five O'Level credits, including Mathematics and English.

== Notable alumni ==
While specific alumni data is limited, Bingham University has produced professionals in medicine, law, and technology, contributing to Nigeria's workforce. Notable figures include medical practitioners trained at BUTH and entrepreneurs from the Faculty of Entrepreneurship.

== See also ==
- List of universities in Nigeria
- Education in Nasarawa State
- Private universities in Nigeria
