= Evangel Theological Seminary =

Seminary in Kyiv, Ukraine

Evangel Theological University, Kyiv, Ukraine
- Євангельська Теологічна Семінарія
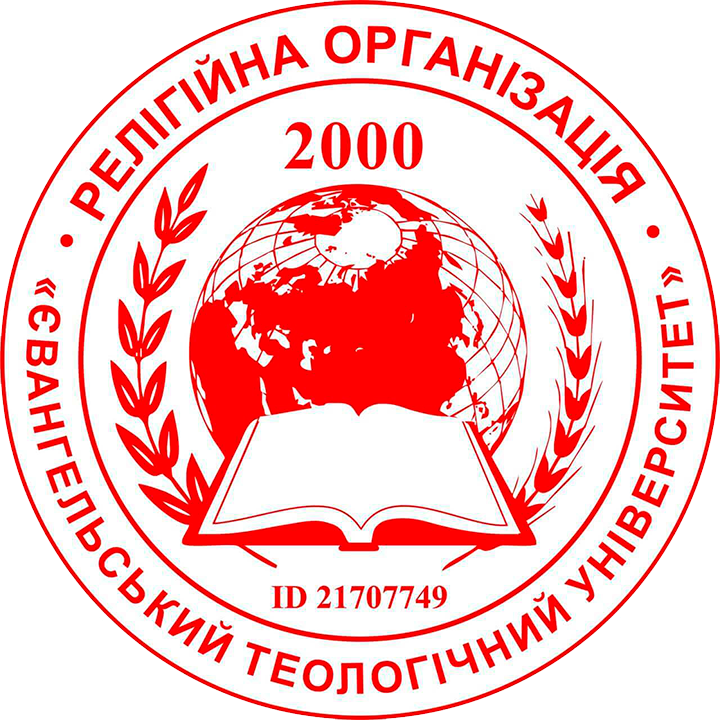
- Type: Private
- Established: 2000
- Religious affiliation: Evangelical, Pentecostal
- Academic affiliations: Kyiv Bible Institute
- Location: Kyiv, Ukraine; 50.3979°N 30.5134°E
- Campus: Kyiv
- Website: www.evangelts.org

Evangel Theological University (ETU) (Formerly Evangel Theological Seminary) is an evangelical theological seminary based in Kyiv, Ukraine.

== History ==
In 1997, Ukrainian President Kuchma called a meeting of national religious leaders to plan for the 2000 anniversary celebration of the birth of Christ. During that meeting a request was made to the President that property be granted for the building of a church and seminary in the city of Kyiv. As a direct result of this request the mayor of Kyiv appropriated the present site. Plans were drawn, and construction began, and continued for 2 1/2 years until the building was fully completed. Since the beginning of classes in 2002, graduates are now ministering in countries throughout the former Soviet Union and beyond.

== Campus ==
ETU library:

Evangel Theological University has more than 27,000 library books, computer aids, audio/video resources and journals both in English and in Russian language.

== Academics ==
The seminary offers two degree programs: Master of Arts in Christian Studies and Master of Arts in Bible and Theology which enhances the professional level of students in the area of Pentecostal Theology, teaching and leadership skills.

The ultimate purpose of education in this program is the readiness of graduates to teach on a college level, organize new study programs, plant churches and involvement in local church ministry. Courses can be completed during a two-year residency. Some classes are also offered at extension sites. Completion requires 20 for Master of Arts in Christian studies and 24 for Master of Arts in Bible and Theology, for students with BA in Christian studies.
