= George Morling =

George Henry Morling OBE (21 Nov 1891 – 8 April 1974) was an Australian Baptist minister who was Principal of the NSW Baptist College (which was later named in his honour) from 1921 to 1960. Morling also served as President General of the Baptist Union of Australia from 1962 to 1964.

== Early life and education ==
Morling was born in Sydney on 21 November 1891, the third child of Annie Hillman and Charles A. Morling. His father had been refused entry to Charles Spurgeon's Pastor's College because he was "consumptive" and come to Australia to recover. Morling was baptised and joined Ashfield Baptist Church at age 17, before attending Sydney University where he graduated with a BA in 1913. He applied to be trained as a Baptist minister and was sent to the Victorian Baptist College in 1915, before returning to Sydney the following year as one of the first batch of students at the new Baptist College there.

Morling completed an MA at Sydney University in 1925.

== Career ==
Morling had a brief stint in the country before taking up a pastorate in the city in 1919. He became a visiting lecturer at the Baptist College around the same time, and was appointed acting principal in 1922 after the abrupt resignation of Alexander Gordon. Despite critics saying he was too young, he was appointed principal the following year. He was appointed an honorary lecturer in Church History at Sydney University in 1938 and chairman of Inter Varsity Fellowship Australia in 1947. He published a book on Christian spirituality called The Quest for Serenity in 1952.

Morling retired as Principal of the College in 1960, and served as Vice President of the Baptist Union of NSW from 1960 to 1962 and then President General of the Baptist Union of Australia from 1962 to 1964. He was appointed an OBE in the 1963 New Year Honours for "services to religion".

== Personal life ==
Morling married Gladys Rees on 28 April 1917. He suffered from chronic ill health.

== Death and legacy ==
In early 1974, Morling developed thrombosis in his left leg, eventually leading to its amputation. His health continued to decline and he died on 8 April 1974.

Rowland Croucher described Morling as one of the four most admired Australian Baptists, alongside Geoffrey Blackburn, F. W. Boreham, and Noel Vose. In 1985, the NSW Baptist College was renamed Morling College in his honour. A biography of Morling, sub-titled Our Beloved Principal was published in 2014.
