= Geoffrey Blackburn =

Geoffrey Herbert Blackburn OAM (7 November 1914 – 13 July 2014) was an Australian Baptist minister who served as Secretary and President General of the Baptist Union of Australia.

Blackburn was born in Melbourne in 1914 and began his ministry as a home missionary at Beechworth Baptist church in 1934. He completed his studies at the Baptist College of Victoria in 1939, obtaining B.A. and LTh degrees, and ministered in the parishes of Hopetoun and Elsternwick. He also served as an army chaplain during World War II.

In 1947 Blackburn was appointed as the Baptist Union of Victoria's first full-time Youth Director, during which time he completed a BEd at the University of Melbourne. He served in the capacity of Editor of Sunday School Publications from 1949 to 1972, before returning to parish ministry at Syndal until his retirement in 1986. In addition to this, Blackburn was Secretary of the Baptist Union of Australia from 1949 to 1971 and its President General from 1971 to 1975. He also served as vice-president of the Baptist World Alliance from 1975 to 1980.

Blackburn obtained an M.A. from the University of Melbourne in 1965, examining the development of the Jewish elementary school. In 1969 he received a PhD from the same institution. His doctoral thesis involved methods of biblical study in the Early Christian Church. He also obtained a DMin from Fuller Theological Seminary in 1991, writing on cross-cultural ministry.

Blackburn was granted the Medal of the Order of Australia in 1998 for "service to the Baptist church". The Geoffrey Blackburn Library at Whitley College is named in his honour, and he was one of the inaugural inductees into the Camberwell Grammar School Gallery of Achievement. Rowland Croucher described Blackburn as one of the four most admired Australian Baptists, alongside G. H. Morling, F. W. Boreham and Noel Vose.

After his official retirement Blackburn engaged in several interim ministries in Victorian churches, including Heathmont and Diamond Valley Baptist Churches. From 2001 he served as part-time Pastoral Care minister at Scots' Church, Melbourne. In April 2012 Blackburn retired for the final time, at the age of 97. In 1940 he married Edna Atkins, who died in 1967. They had two sons. In 1969 he married Jessie Campbell, who died 29 March 2019. He was survived by Jessie, sons Keith and Alan and five grandchildren.
