= Grenville Kent =

Australian Christian academic, film producer and author (born 1965)

Grenville J. R. Kent
- Born: 1965 (age 60–61)
- Education: University of Manchester, Australian College of Theology
- Known for: Christian academic, film producer, author

Grenville J. R. Kent (born 1965) is an Australian author, academic, film producer, and Christian communicator.

Kent wrote "God Walks Into A Bar... Evidence For (and Against) Faith" and "Sex Robots and People", and produced Big Questions, an international documentary series critically examining reasons to believe in God.

He has a PhD from the University of Manchester, England, a D.Min from the Australian College of Theology, and postgraduate letters in Film (UTS), Sexology (Curtin University), Commerce (UNSW) and Education (UNE), teaching Science and History. He supervises doctorates and teaches casually at Morling College, Australian College of Ministries and seminaries in the developing world.

== Biography ==
Grenville Kent grew up in Sydney and was educated in Australia and England. He started studying Economics/ Law and ranked fourth in his class at Sydney University, then found faith and switched to Theology, working as a youth worker in churches, schools and prisons and speaking internationally to young people.

He completed BA and MA in Film, and worked as a writer and director of commercials, documentaries and corporate films. He wrote and produced Big Questions, a series of 13 x 30-minute documentaries exploring evidence for and against Christian faith such as astronomy, cosmology, the water molecule in the Fine-tuned universe, design, the Argument from Consciousness, the Argument from morality, DNA, the Problem of Evil, Old Testament Messianic prophecy, and the Resurrection of Jesus. The films were shot in 32 countries and interviewed leading atheists like Professors Lawrence Krauss, Sam Harris, Daniel Dennett, Peter Atkins and Bart D. Ehrman alongside believers like Professor John Lennox, William Lane Craig, Alister McGrath, Hugh Ross, Ben Carson and Peter J. Williams. Kent co-presented alongside his young son Marcus.

Kent taught Old Testament and Cultural Apologetics (Arts/Theology) at the Wesley Institute from 2003 to 2013. His MA (Theol) from Morling College studied the Song of Solomon, a piece of Biblical erotica. His PhD from the University of Manchester is in Hebrew Bible / Old Testament literature, and examines the Witch of En-Dor narrative using film theory. His DMin is in Apologetics (the rational explanation of Christianity) and applies marketing research to analyse factors influencing Australians towards and away from belief in God. Kent has presented at the Society of Biblical Literature and the Evangelical Theological Society in the United States, and the Tyndale Fellowship in the United Kingdom. He has guest-lectured in the Philippines, Papua New Guinea and Trinidad. He has presented on Christian apologetics for the Cambridge Scholars Network, European Leadership Forum (Hungary) and Campus Life, and taken training weekends and outreach seminars for Baptist, Church of Christ, Salvation Army, Adventist, Pentecostal and Uniting churches among others.

== Publications ==
Kent has authored books, chapters and articles, both popular and academic, and written films and comic books (graphic novels).

=== Popular writing ===
- "God Walks Into A Bar...: Evidence For (and Against) Faith". Resource Publications, 2025.
- "The Bull Story and Other Inspiring Tails". Resource Publications, 2024. A collection of short stories.
- “Sex Robots and People", in A Curious Machine: Wesleyan Reflections on the Post-Human Future, eds. Arseny Ermakov and Glen O'Brien (Eugene: Wipf & Stock, 2023) 151-173. This volume was short-listed for Australian Christian Book of the Year, 2024.
- Grenville Kent and Philip Rodionoff, The Da Vinci Decode (Victoria, Australia: Signs, 2006); book website, also published in Portuguese and Czech. and Russian.
- Kent wrote many humorous short stories in the "Australian Stories" series published by Strand, including "Hardly Davidson", "Bowled Over", "Common Scents", "Going Off", "The Game They Play in Heaven", "When Is an Atheist Not An Atheist?", "I'm Rich!", "Hedonists Don't Get No Satisfaction", and "Meeting the Godfather".

=== Comics / graphic novels ===
- Grenville Kent and Dan Koziol, Millennium (Sydney: Religious Education Media Australia, 1996); ISBN 0-646-27865-7
- Grenville Kent, The Siege (Sydney: self-published, 1994); ISBN 0-646-21173-0
- Grenville Kent, What Future? The Forgotten Dream (Sydney: self-published, 1994); ISBN 0-646-17185-2

=== Academic writing ===
- '"His Desire Is For Her": Feminist readings of the Song of Solomon', in Andrew Sloane (ed.), Tamar's Tears: Evangelical Engagements with Feminist Old Testament Hermeneutics (Eugene: Wipf and Stock, 2011), 217–245.
- "'Call Up Samuel': Who Appeared to the Witch at En-Dor? (1 Sam 28:3-25)" Andrews University Seminary Studies 52, no. 2 (Autumn 2014) 141-160.
- Say It Again, Sam: A Literary and Filmic Study of Narrative Repetition in 1 Samuel 28. Cambridge: Lutterworth, 2011. About the witch of Endor
- 'Mary Magdalene, Mary of Bethany and the sinful woman of Luke 7: the same person?' Journal of the Asia Adventist Seminary 13.1 (2010): 13–28.
- “¡Rómpeles los dientes! ¡Aplasten las cabezas de sus hijos! Salmos imprecatorios como apelación al Juez", in Richard M. Davidson & Edgard A. Horna (eds), Me invocarás, y yo te responderé": Estudios selectos en el Salterio (Lima, Perú: Ediciones Theologika, 2018) 335-366.
- 'The Heavens Are Telling: A Biblically Informed Cosmology', in Bryan W. Ball (ed), In The Beginning: Science and Scripture Confirm Creation (Boise: Pacific Press, 2012), 171–183.
- Grenville J. R. Kent, Paul J. Kissling, and Laurence A. Turner, eds., Reclaiming the Old Testament for Christian Preaching (Inter-Varsity Press, 2010), publisher's page. Kent also wrote the chapter, "Preaching the Song of Songs". The book won the annual Preaching Today award for the "Enhancing the Preacher's Skill" category. An alternative title is He Began with Moses: Preaching the Old Testament today (Inter-Varsity Press, 2010), publisher's page.
- 'Preaching Old Testament Narratives', Southeastern Theological Review 2/1 (Summer 2011) 11–24.

=== Films and documentaries ===
Kent has produced films such as:

- Big Questions documentary series, available on YouTube
- The Cross, a 2000 short film written and directed by Kent
- Cushy Job: Rwanda Volunteer, a 1995 short film written and directed by Kent
- What Future? A 1994 short film co-written and co-directed by Kent
- Alcheringa, a 1993 short film written by Kent
