= Marita Munro =

Australian academic and church historian (born 1954)

- Born: 1955 (age 70–71)
- Occupations: academic, church historian

Academic background
- Education: University of Melbourne PhD; University of Queensland (BA)
- Thesis: A Struggle for Identity and Direction: A History of Victoria Baptists (c. 1960-c.2000) (2010)

Academic work
- Discipline: Church history
- Sub-discipline: Baptist studies
- Institutions: University of Divinity
- Main interests: Baptist history and Australian religious history
- Website: www.whitley.edu.au/about/our-staff/faculty/rev-dr-marita-munro/

Marita Munro (born 1955) is an Australian minister and academic who was the first Baptist woman to be ordained in Australia.

== Early life and education ==
Munro was born in Queensland. She received a Bachelor of Arts from the University of Queensland. In 1975, she moved to Victoria to study theology at Whitley College. She graduated with a Bachelor of Divinity from the Melbourne College of Divinity (now known as the University of Divinity).

Munro has a Diploma of Education from La Trobe University. She has a Masters in Theology from the International Baptist Theological Studies Seminary in Switzerland. Her thesis was titled The Theology and Practice of the Lord's Supper in the Writings of Balthasar Huebmaier.

Munro also has a Master of Arts from the University of Melbourne. Her thesis is titled A History of the House of the Gentle Bunyip, 1975-1996.

Munro completed her PhD at the University of Melbourne. Her doctoral thesis was titled "A Struggle for Identity and Direction": A History of Victoria Baptists (c.1960-c.2000).

== Career ==
Munro was ordained at Collins Street Baptist Church on 1 October 1978 at age 23, making her the first woman Baptist minister ordained in Australia. She pastored at the House of the Gentle Bunyip Christian Community and Clifton Hill Baptist Church. She also taught at two Melbourne high schools.

Munro joined the faculty of Whitley College in 1995 and is a lecturer in Baptist Studies and Church History. She is the President of the Victoria Baptist Historical Society.

== Publications ==
- Marita Munro and Roslyn Otzen, eds. ‘Doing What Comes Naturally,’ Baptcare, Vic., December 2017.
- ‘“A Debt of Gratitude”: Martin Luther, Anabaptists and Baptists’. 134 (Autumn 2017): 16–18.
- Biographical essay. In Frank Rees, ed. . Melbourne: Whitley College, 2016, 9-24.
- “Making Connections”: Australian Baptists and the Public Sphere in the Twentieth Century’. In Douglas Weaver, ed. . Milton Keynes, UK: Paternoster, 2015, 188–204.
- ‘Brunswick Baptist Church: the first fifty years, 1862-1912’. 22 (2014): 26–55.
- ‘No Plaster Saints.’ In Alan Cadwallader, ed. . Adelaide: Australian Theological Forum: 2010, 157–74.
- ‘ “A Struggle for Identity and Direction”: A History of Victoria Baptists, c. 1960-c.2000’. Peter Lang, Berlin.
