= Graham Hill (theologian) =

Australian theologian (born 1969)

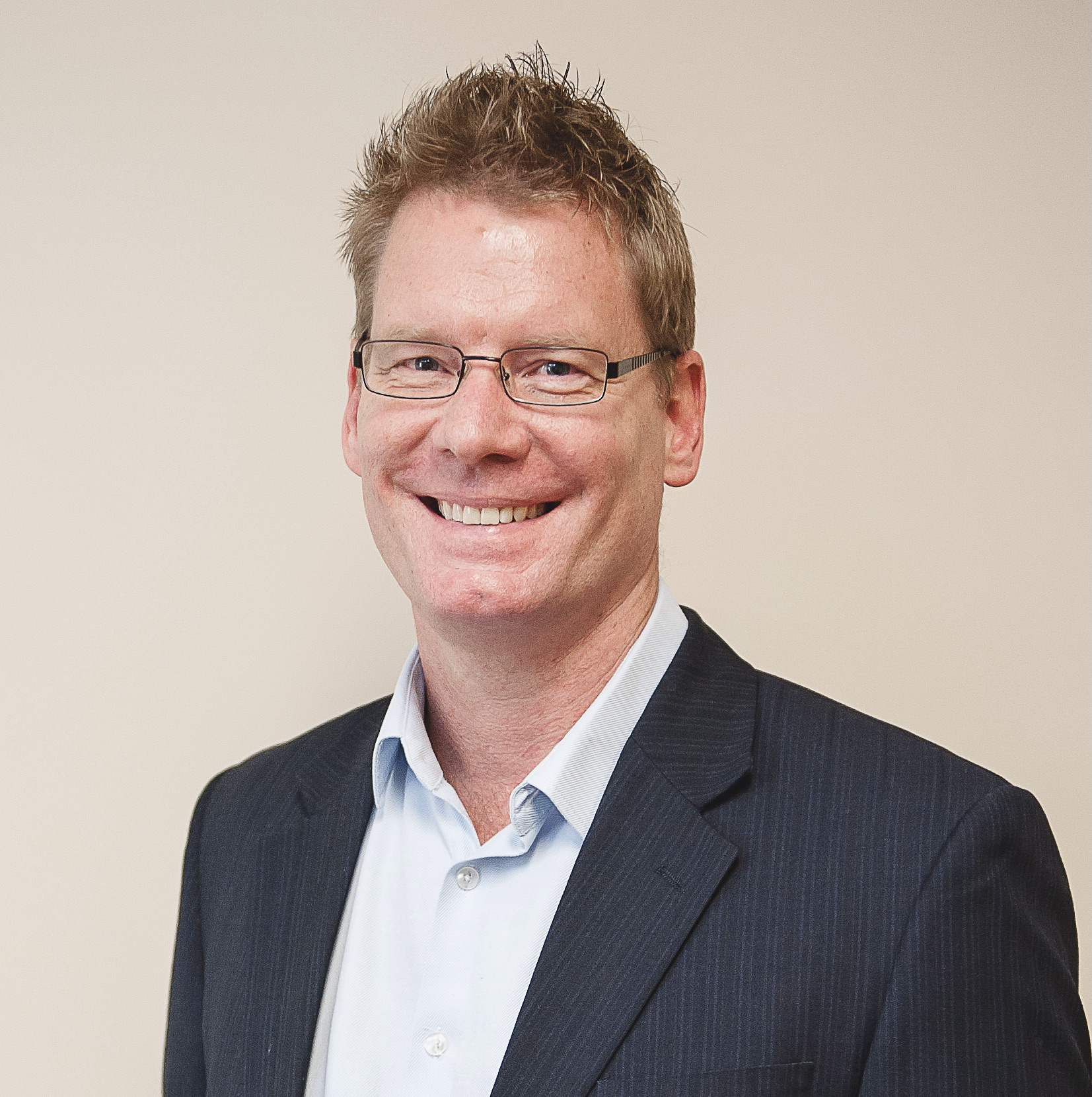
- Born: 8 July 1969 (age 57); Sydney, Australia
- Education: Flinders University; University of Notre Dame Australia
- Occupation: Theologian
- Known for: Missiology
- Notable work: Global Church; Holding Up Half the Sky; Salt, Light and a City; Healing Our Broken Humanity
- Movement: Baptist; Uniting Church
- Awards: Medal of the Order of Australia, 2024
- Website: https://grahamjosephhill.com

Graham Joseph Hill (born 8 July 1969) is an Australian theologian who is a former associate professor of the University of Divinity. Since 2024, he works as a mission catalyst for the Uniting Church in New South Wales and the Australian Capital Territory. Hill is a research associate with the Center for the Study of Global Christianity at Gordon–Conwell Theological Seminary in Hamilton, Massachusetts, US, and an associate professor and research fellow at Charles Sturt University. Hill is the author or editor of eighteen theological books. His research focuses on World Christianity but he is also known for his work on biblical egalitarianism and women theologians of global Christianity. He has published in the areas of missiology, applied theology, Christian spirituality and global and ecumenical approaches to missional ecclesiology.

== Education ==
In addition to undergraduate studies, Hill completed a Master of Theology degree at the University of Notre Dame Australia, and a Doctor of Philosophy (Ph.D) at Flinders University.

== Career ==
Hill was involved in a church plant in 1988. He entered theological college for ministerial training in 1994 and received the Annual Theological Essay Award (Undergraduate Section) in 1996 for an essay titled "Augustine's Influence on Calvin, Zwingli and Luther". He was ordained and accredited by the Australian Baptist Churches in 2000. After church planting and pastoring in Sydney and Perth, Hill moved into theological education in 2004.

Hill was a lecturer at Burleigh Baptist Theological College in Adelaide from 2004 to 2006. Hill was a lecturer, vice-principal and provost of Morling College in Sydney from 2007 to 2019, a theological college affiliated with the Australian College of Theology and the University of Divinity. He presented at a 2013 Baptist World Alliance global gathering, and both the General Secretary and President of the Baptist World Alliance reviewed his books. Hill served as interim principal of Stirling Theological College (a member college of the University of Divinity) from February to November 2020 and principal from December 2020 to March 2022. Hill was promoted to associate professor of the University of Divinity in 2020.

Hill served as a visiting scholar at the Korean Baptist Theological University and Seminary in South Korea in 2019. He delivered public lectures and seminars at that Baptist university, as well as at Torch Trinity Graduate University in Seoul, South Korea. He serves as an adjunct faculty member of Abilene Christian University in Texas, in their Doctor of Ministry program. On 7 March 2018, Hill was a keynote speaker at the Bible Society of Australia Church Leaders' Summit held at the InterContinental Hotel, Sydney.

From 2022 to 2023, Hill was the state leader of Baptist Mission Australia for Western Australia. Since 2024, he is the Mission Catalyst for Church Planting and Missional Renewal with the Uniting Churches in New South Wales and the Australian Capital Territory, and an associate professor and research fellow at Charles Sturt University.

Hill reported struggling with alcoholism and depression while working as a church pastor, and stopped drinking alcohol in 2005.

Hill is the founding director of the Global Church Project. He is chief editor of the Australian Journal of Mission Studies. Hill is a research associate at the Center for the Study of Global Christianity (at Gordon-Conwell Theological Seminary in Hamilton, Massachusetts).

In the 2024 King's Birthday Honours list, Hill was awarded the Medal of the Order of Australia (OAM) for "service to theological education, and to the Baptist Churches of Australia".

== Personal life ==
Hill married Felicity Herbert in 1996 and they have three daughters. They divorced in 2022.

Hill married Christianne Shyn Ellamar in 2023.

== Research ==
Hill's first book explored ecumenical and missional approaches to Christian ecclesiology. This work was a revision of his PhD thesis, "An Examination of Emerging-Missional Ecclesiological Conceptions: Missional Ecclesiology and the Ecclesiologies of Miroslav Volf, Joseph Ratzinger and John Zizioulas", and was published in 2012 by Cascade Books. Scot McKnight awarded the book the Jesus Creed Book of the Year in the category Church in 2012, writing "This is the most important book I have ever read on the church."

Hill's book Global Church: Reshaping Our Conversations, Renewing Our Mission, Revitalizing Our Churches was published by IVP Academic in 2016. Global Church and his research into global Christianity have been reviewed in Patheos, Christian Courier, Moody Bible Institute, and academic journals. Global Church was awarded an honorable mention in the 2015 IVP Academic Readers Choice Awards.

Hill's book Healing Our Broken Humanity: Practices for Revitalizing the Church and Renewing the World, co-authored with Grace Ji-Sun Kim, was named as a Resource of the Year - Culture by Outreach Magazine in 2019. The book was examined on ABC Radio National's Soul Search program, with reference to its research into Asian Christianity, and the interview was broadcast on the ABC on 18 August 2019.

Hill's book Holding up Half the Sky: A Biblical Case For Women Leading and Teaching in the Church has been profiled by Scot McKnight.

== Selected publications ==
- Hill, Graham Joseph (2012). Salt, Light, and a City: Introducing Missional Ecclesiology. Eugene, OR: Cascade Books. ISBN 9781608997565.
- Hill, Graham Joseph (2013). Servantship: Sixteen Servants on the Four Movements of Radical Servantship. Eugene, OR: Cascade Books. ISBN 978-1620328248.
- Hill, Graham Joseph (2015). Signs of Hope in the City: Renewing Urban Mission, Embracing Radical Hope. Melbourne: ISUM. ISBN 978-0992394110.
- Hill, Graham Joseph (2015). Global Church: Reshaping Our Conversations, Renewing Our Mission, Revitalizing Our Churches. Downers Grove, IL: IVP Academic. ISBN 978-0-8308-4085-4. Archived from the original on 18 September 2021.
- Hill, Graham Joseph; Kim, Grace Ji-Sun (2018). Healing Our Broken Humanity: Practices for Revitalizing the Church and Renewing the World. Downers Grove, IL: InterVarsity Press. ISBN 978-0-8308-4541-5.
- Hill, Graham Joseph (2020). Holding Up Half the Sky: A Biblical Case for Women Leading and Teaching in the Church. Eugene, OR: Cascade Books. ISBN 978-1532686115.
- Hill, Graham Joseph; Frost, Michael (2020). Hide This in Your Heart: Memorizing Scripture for Kingdom Impact. Colorado Springs, CO: NavPress. ISBN 978-1-64158-204-9.
- Hill, Graham Joseph (2020). Relentless Love: Living Out Integral Mission to Combat Poverty, Injustice and Conflict. Carlisle: Langham Literature. ISBN 978-1839730375.
- Hill, Graham Joseph; Geldenhuys, Desiree (2021). The Soul Online: Bereavement, Social Media, and Competent Care. Eugene, OR: Cascade Books. ISBN 9781725266506.
- Hill, Graham Joseph (2022). Sunburnt Country, Sweeping Pains: The Experiences of Asian Australian Women in Ministry and Mission. Faith and Justice in These Lands Now Called Australia. Eugene, OR: Wipf and Stock. ISBN 9781666715200.
- Hill, Graham Joseph (2024). Genesis: Embracing Beginnings and Honoring Covenants: A Fifty-Day Devotional. Daily Devotions with Jesus. Eugene, OR: Wipf and Stock. ISBN 9798385208456.
- Hill, Graham Joseph (2024). World Christianity: An Introduction. Eugene, OR: Cascade. ISBN 9798385201303.

== Podcast ==
Hill presents a devotional podcast called Daily Devotions with Jesus.
