= Ross Clifford =

Australian theologian

Ross Richard Clifford AM (born 1951) is an Australian Baptist theologian, political commentator, radio personality and author. A former lawyer who later joined the ministry, Clifford became a campaigner on moral issues while a suburban Sydney pastor in the 1980s. He has served as head of several religious organisations and as an occasional media spokesperson. He unsuccessfully ran for a seat in the New South Wales Legislative Council in 2003 for the Christian Democratic Party. Until mid-2010 he had a radio program on Sydney station 2CH.

== Early life and education ==
Clifford was born and raised in the northern suburbs of Sydney and had a private school education. His conversion to Christian faith occurred at the 1959 Billy Graham crusade in Sydney. Clifford initially studied law and obtained a Diploma of Law from the Solicitors Admission Board of NSW. He worked as a solicitor in the inner Sydney suburb of Kings Cross and then served as a barrister specialising in family law in the Northern Territory and New South Wales.

Clifford decided to study for Christian ministry and completed a Bachelor of Theology degree at Morling Baptist Theological College in Sydney. He initially served as pastor at South Windsor Baptist Church and first became involved in public life in the 1980s when he became a campaigner for moral standards in advertising and publications while pastor of Gymea Baptist Church. He also contributed to church and public discourses concerning right-to-life issues and the proposed Australian Bill of Rights, which was debated and defeated during Bob Hawke's term as Prime Minister of Australia.

== Career ==
In the early 1980s Clifford took a sabbatical from his preacher's post to study apologetics at the Simon Greenleaf School of Law in Anaheim, California. Clifford's writings place him within the school of thought known as evidentialist apologetics. His MA thesis examined the apologetics arguments of eight lawyers concerning the resurrection of Christ. The thesis, which was originally published in Russian in 1991 by Missionswerk Friedensstimme, was released in Australia under the title Leading Lawyers Look at the Resurrection (1991). It has been subsequently published in Arabic. On the strength of the Russian version of the book he was invited to speak in the Soviet Union where he met some of the personal staff of Mikhail Gorbachev, various members of the Soviet legal profession, and pastors of Baptist churches.

Clifford served as senior pastor at Gymea Baptist Church from mid-1985 until late 1991. He also became involved with the Sports and Leisure ministry in Australia and eventually co-wrote two books recounting the spiritual conversions of Australian and International sports-stars such as Nick Farr-Jones, Wes Hall and Bernhard Langer. During 1991 he co-founded with Philip Johnson a para-church ministry known as The Community of Hope, which began developing exhibitor's booths as a form of dialogue and witness in alternative spiritual festivals in Sydney. Their collaborative venture became the basis for the book Shooting for the Stars, which recreated encounters between the authors and new spirituality seekers in festivals. This dialogical and apologetic activity in New Age festivals spanned the years 1991–2003 and has been the subject of much discussion in most of his publications released between 2001 and 2004.

Clifford was invited to deliver the annual Leonard Buck lecture in Missions at the Bible College of Victoria in 1995 and chose as his topic The Mission of the Church and the New Age Movement. His apologetic work on alternate spirituality has continued in books concerning the Christian symbolism of tarot cards (Beyond Prediction) and contextual apologetics with new age (Jesus and the Gods of the New Age). He was one of several Australian contributors to the book Encountering New Religious Movements, which was awarded Christianity Today's Book of the Year 2005 award in the "missions" category of literature.

In 1992 Clifford became a lecturer in theology at Morling Baptist Theological College. He also enrolled at the University of Sydney and completed by coursework a Master of Theology degree. He later undertook doctoral studies through the Australian College of Theology and was awarded a Th.D. for his dissertation on the legal apologetic of John Warwick Montgomery. In 1997, Clifford was appointed the Principal of Morling College.

Clifford served as President of the New South Wales Council of Churches throughout the late 1990s, during which time he oversaw an apology to the state's indigenous population for harm caused by the activities of early missionaries, vocally supported gun control in the wake of the Port Arthur massacre and resisted a push from the hotel industry to put poker machines in hotels across the state. In early 1999 Clifford became a Sunday evening radio announcer, appointed to fill a talkback vacancy on Sydney easy listening station 2CH. He retired from the radio show in mid-2010.

In 2003 Clifford attempted to make a move into politics, nominating as a Christian Democratic Party candidate for the New South Wales Legislative Council at the 2003 state election. He received the second position on the CDP ticket behind incumbent member Reverend Gordon Moyes, and took a significant role in the party's campaign. At the time, the CDP was trying to rebuild itself after the 1999 election, when leader Fred Nile nearly lost his seat to the fledgling Registered Clubs Party. Though they had hopes of improving their vote enough to elect two members at the one election for the first time since the early 1990s, these proved unfounded and only Moyes was ultimately elected.

Clifford looked set to receive a second chance at a political career in late 2004, when Nile resigned from the Legislative Council to run for a seat in the Australian Senate. As the party's highest unelected candidate at the previous state election, he was the obvious choice to replace Nile in the Legislative Council and was ultimately nominated to fill the casual vacancy. However, he again missed out when Nile lost the election and to the surprise of much of the parliament, nominated himself for his own vacancy. This caused some protest from the Greens as well as several independent members, who walked out in protest at Nile's move.

Clifford served as the President of Australian Baptist Ministries, from 2005 to 2009. He was appointed in late 2004 as the Australian Chairman of the Lausanne Committee for World Evangelization, and was a group coordinator at the 2004 Lausanne Forum in Pattaya, Thailand, dealing with alternative spiritualities and new religions. He is occasionally asked for comment by the media and spoke out against the industrial relations changes introduced by the Howard government in 2005. Clifford is interviewed once a week by the Western Australian radio station Sonshine-FM.

Clifford is married and has two children. In January 2001 the Australian Commonwealth Government awarded him the Centenary Medal in recognition of his ministry, and in June 2010 he was made a Member of the Order of Australia. On 7 February 2012, Clifford was re-elected as President of the NSW Council of Churches, a council made up of representatives of seven evangelical Christian denominations – the Anglican, Baptist, Reformed, Churches of Christ, Congregational, Presbyterian and Salvation Army churches. The current president is Glenn Davies

In November 2019, Clifford resigned as state president of the Christian Democratic Party during a "bitter split" and attempt by some party members to "remove the board and Mr Nile, amid accusations of nepotism and mismanagement."

== Books ==
- Leading Lawyers Look at the Resurrection (Sutherland: Albatross Books, 1991). ISBN 0-86760-127-2
- and Philip Johnson, Shooting for the Stars (Sutherland: Albatross Books, 1993). ISBN 0-7324-1024-X
- and Philip Johnson, Sacred Quest (Sutherland: Albatross Books, 1995; a revised edition of Shooting for the Stars). ISBN 0-7324-1024-X
- and Ric Chapman, The Gods of Sport (Sutherland: Albatross Books, 1995). ISBN 0-7324-1049-5
- The Mission of the Church and the New Age Movement (Lilydale: Bible College of Victoria, 1995).
- Leading Lawyers' Case for the Resurrection (Alberta, Canada: Canadian Institute for Law, Theology and Public Policy,(1996). ISBN 1-896363-02-4
- and Philip Johnson, Riding the Rollercoaster: How The Risen Christ Empowers Life (Sydney: Strand, 1998). ISBN 0-9586866-6-1
- and Ric Chapman, The International Gods of Sport (Sydney: Strand, 1999). ISBN 1-876825-36-7
- and Philip Johnson, Jesus and the Gods of the New Age (Oxford: Lion, 2001/Colorado Springs: Victor, 2003). ISBN 0-7459-5060-4 ISBN 0-7814-3943-4
- and John Drane and Philip Johnson, Beyond Prediction: The Tarot and Your Spirituality (Oxford: Lion, [2001]). ISBN 0-7459-5035-3
- "Reframing a Traditional Apologetic to Reach 'New Spirituality' Seekers," in Encountering New Religious Movements: A Holistic Evangelical Approach, Irving Hexham, Stephen Rost and John Morehead, eds. (Grand Rapids: Kregel, 2004)pp 193–208. ISBN 0-8254-2893-9
- John Warwick Montgomery's Legal Apologetic: An Apologetic for all Seasons (Verlag für Kultur und Wissenschaft/Culture and Science Publishers, Bonn, Germany, 2004). ISBN 3-938116-00-5
- "Apologetics, Persuasion, and Pastoral Care" in Tough-Minded Christianity: Honoring the Legacy of John Warwick Montgomery, eds. William Dembski and Thomas Schirrmacher (Nashville: B & H Academic, 2008). ISBN 978-0-8054-4783-5
- Apologetic Preaching and Teaching For the Church and the Marketplace (Macquarie Park, NSW: Morling Press, 2011). ISBN 978-0-9806421-5-5
- and Philip Johnson, The Cross Is Not Enough: Living as Witnesses to the Resurrection (Grand Rapids: Baker Books, 2012). ISBN 978-0-8010-1461-1
- and Philip Johnson, Taboo Or To Do? (London: Darton, Longman and Todd, 2016). ISBN 978-0-232-53253-1.
