= Victorian Council of Churches =

Victorian Council of Churches is a body composed of leaders from Christian churches of the State of Victoria, Australia. It was formed to present a unified front to influence public discourse and government policy, and also served to increase communication and cooperation between churches with similar aims and philosophies.

== Member Churches ==
The current Member Churches (34, in alphabetical order) are:

- Anglican Dioceses of Melbourne, Ballarat, Bendigo, Gippsland and Wangaratta
- Antiochian Orthodox Church
- Armenian Apostolic Church
- Bulgarian Orthodox Church
- Chinese Methodist Church in Australia (CMCA)
- Churches of Christ
- Coptic Orthodox Church
- German Lutheran Trinity Church
- Greek Orthodox Church
- Holy Apostolic Catholic Assyrian Church of the East
- Lutheran Church in Australia Vic
- Malankara Orthodox Syrian Church
- Mar Thoma Syrian Church
- Melbourne Church of South India (MCSI)
- Religious Society of Friends (Quakers)
- Roman Catholic Archdiocese of Melbourne and the Dioceses of Ballarat, Sale and Sandhurst;the Melkite Catholic Eparchy;the Ukrainian Catholic Eparchy;the Chaldean Catholic Church;the Maronite Catholic Eparchy
- St John's German Lutheran Church Springvale
- Jacobite Syrian Orthodox Church
- Romanian Orthodox Church
- The Salvation Army
- Malankara (Indian) Orthodox Syrian Church (MOSC)
- Uniting Church in Australia Vic/Tas Synod
- The Melbourne Welsh Church

== Early history ==
The organisation was founded as the Council of Churches in Victoria on 6 September 1892, when representatives of various denominations — Anglican, Presbyterian, Wesleyan Methodist, Baptist, Congregational, Lutheran, Primitive Methodist, United Methodist Free Churches, Quakers and Bible Christians — meeting at the library of the Congregational hall, Russell Street, agreed on a title, objects and Constitution. The number of delegates supplied by each denomination was stipulated, according to the number of adherents, with equal number of clerical and lay representatives. The Anglican church was given the greatest representation, with twelve persons, but was the last to nominate delegates and the first to withdraw from association. James Rickard of the Brighton Congregational Church was influential in its formation but became less significant as the council developed.

== Office Bearers (1895-1950) ==
It was agreed that the office of president should be rotated through the membership bodies. In 1900 the format of the council was not yet settled. In time, Councils of Churches were also established, with varying degrees of success, for larger conurbations such as Ballarat, Geelong and Bendigo. They are not considered in this article.

This article traces the history of the Council through a list of presidents (initially elected annually by rota) and to a lesser extent its secretaries and treasurers, the workers of the organisation, who generally held the post for long periods, providing continuity.

- 1895 Llewelyn D. Bevan (Congregational)
- 1900 John Meiklejohn (Presbyterian)
- 1901 J. John Halley (Congregational)
- 1902 S. Pearce Carey (Baptist), of the Collins Street church
- 1903 William H. Fitchett (Methodist)

Around this time, the Anglican Church showed an interest in the Council.

- 1904 (Henry) Lowther Clarke (Anglican), Bishop of Melbourne
- 1905 Alexander Stewart (Presbyterian), of Essendon
- 1906 James Rickard (Congregationalist) previously secretary
- 1907 Hermann Herlitz (Lutheran)
- 1908 S. Pearce Carey (Baptist)
- 1909 T. S. B. Woodfull (Methodist)

Walter J. Eddy (Methodist) was secretary 1909–1914

- 1910 David Stow Adam (Presbyterian)
- 1911 Ernest Davies (Congregational), of St Augustine's Church, Hawthorn
- 1912 Frederic C. Spurr (Baptist)
- 1913 Alex McCallum (Methodist)
- 1914 James T. Robertson (Presbyterian)

In 1914 Walter J. Eddy resigned as secretary.

- 1915 R. Ambrose Roberts son of Rev. R. T. Roberts
- 1916 Edward Dybing (Baptist)

Robert Philip was secretary

- 1917 Henry Worrall
- 1918 James E. Thomas (Church of Christ) (Note: Thomas was previously president of the Council of Churches in South Australia.) of Lygon Street church
- 1919 James McBride (Presbyterian)
- 1920 J. Ernest James (Congregational) of Collins Street church
- 1921 Arthur Richard Thompson (Baptist) of Elsternwick.

James E. Thomas was secretary 1921–1923

- 1922 George A. Judkins (Methodist)
- 1923 A. E. Illingworth (Church of Christ)

J. Ernest James (Congregational) secretary 1923–1925

- 1924 Frank H. L. Paton
- 1925 William Silas Pearse (Congregational)

George A. Judkins secretary 1925–1945

- 1926 W(illiam) Dodds Jackson, Baptist
- 1927 William Harris (Note: Harris's father, brother Samuel, and eldest son (Stewart) Selwyn Harris (5 August 1901 – 1959) were also Methodist ministers.) (Methodist)
- 1928 John Edward Shipway (Church of Christ)

In 1928 the Council protested the grand reception for Bert Hinkler being held on a Sunday.

- 1929 Alex Hardie
- 1930 A. Deans
- 1931 J. C. Martin
- 1932 J. H. Cain (Methodist)
- 1933 Albert J. Ingham (Church of Christ)
- 1934 W. J. Harris (Presbyterian)
- 1935 J. D. Northey (Congregational) of Camberwell Church

Legalisation of the totalisator was attacked.

- 1936 Sydney E. Dorman (Baptist)
- 1937 Henry Worrall (Methodist)
- 1938 P. D. McCallum (Churches of Christ)
- 1939 John Armour, (Presbyterian)
- 1940 Sydney E. Dorman (Baptist)
- 1941 William J. Williams (Methodist)
- 1942 S. Neighbour (Church of Christ)
- 1943 William Silas Pearse (Congregationalist) for the second time
- 1944 R. W. Stephens (Presbyterian), of Footscray Church

G. A. Judkins' last year as secretary.

- 1945 Horace H. Jeffs (Baptist)

Courteney Thomas was secretary 1945–1950

- 1946 F. W. Ede (Salvation Army)
- 1947 R. Caradoc Hughes (Latrobe Street Welsh Church)
- 1948 F. E. Richards (Methodist)
- 1949 F. A. Forward (Note: A member of the famous Forward family of Congregationalists) (Congregational)
- 1950 William John Salter (Baptist) of West Melbourne Church
