= Central Hall =

Central Hall can refer to:

== Australia ==
- Central Hall, Adelaide, South Australia, a now-demolished building built in 1894
- Central Hall, Melbourne, part of the Australian Catholic University
- Central Hall, Little Collins Street, Baptist hall in Melbourne

== United Kingdom ==
- Methodist Central Hall, Birmingham, a former Methodist hall
- Grand Central Hall, Liverpool, a former Methodist hall
- Methodist Central Hall, Westminster, London, a former Methodist hall

== United States ==
- Central Hall (Sea Cliff, New York), a historic commercial building in Nassau County, New York

== See also ==
- Central-passage house or central hall plan house, a vernacular floor plan
- Second Floor Center Hall, in the White House, Washington D.C.
