= Henry Worrall =

Henry Worral may refer to:

- Henry Worrall (artist) (1825–1902), English-American artist
- Henry Worrall (minister) (1862–1940), English-Australian minister
