= Woodfull =

Woodfull is a surname. Notable people with the name include:

- A. H. Woodfull (1912–2011), English product designer
- Bill Woodfull OBE (1897–1965), Australian cricketer
- Paul Woodfull (born 1957), Irish writer, actor, comedian and musician
- T. S. B. Woodfull (1863–1941), Methodist minister in Victoria, Australia
