= Sterling College =

Sterling College may refer to:

- Sterling College (Kansas)
- Sterling College (Vermont)

== See also ==
- Stirling Theological College
