= Shipway =

Shipway is an English language surname. It may refer to:

- Frank Shipway (1935–2014), British conductor
- George Shipway (1908–1982), British writer
- J. E. Shipway (1885–1960), Australian Churches of Christ pastor
- Mark Shipway (born 1976), Australian rugby league player
- Matt Shipway (born 1985), Australian rugby league player and coach
- William Shipway (1862–1925), Australian politician
