= James E. Thomas =

Australian preacher (1879–1944)

Rev. James Edward Thomas (28 May 1879 – 27 November 1944) was an Australian Churches of Christ (Note: In this article, "Churches of Christ" has been used for the world-wide movement, while "Church of Christ" has been attached to named buildings and congregations.) preacher whose career began in Adelaide, and developed in Melbourne. He was reckoned "one of the foremost Churches of Christ preachers in Australia".

== History ==
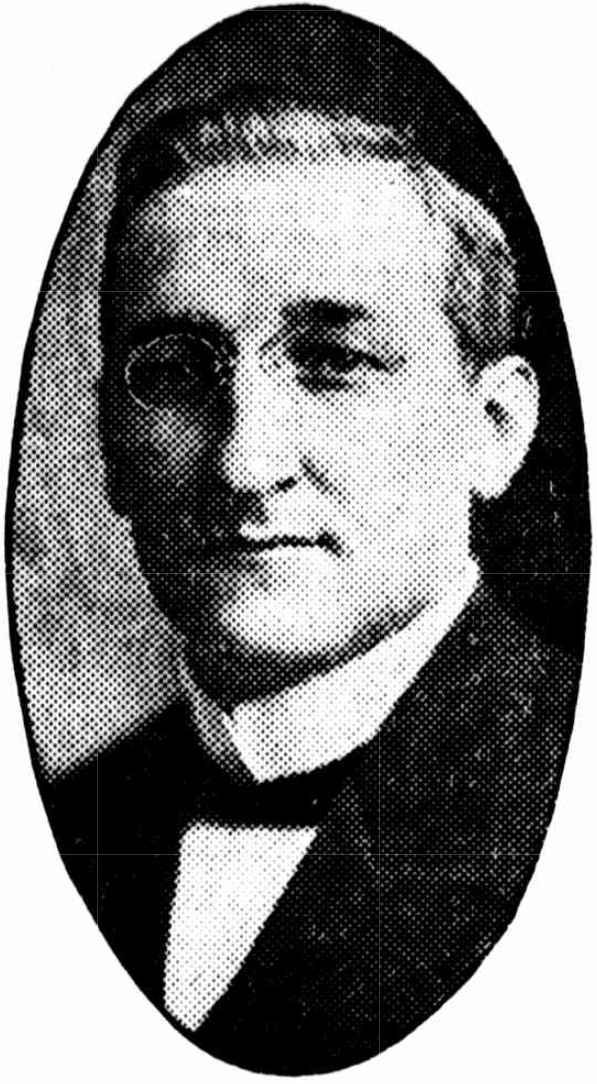
James E. Thomas

Thomas was born in Adelaide, a son of George Edward Thomas (died June 1913) from Devon, a veteran of the Crimean War, and Sarah Ann Thomas, née Emerson (died 1912)

He spent his early youth in the City of Unley, attending a local school and the Sturt Street School, then some training in a business school. He "got religion" early, and by age 16 was preaching at the Church of Christ, Unley. At age 21 he became the pastor at the Point Sturt church, near Milang, and at Stirling East (between Stirling and Aldgate), both churches recording greatly increased attendance under his pastorage.

For four years he studied at College of the Bible and School of Philosophy at Kentucky University, from which institution T. J. Gore, Ira A. Paternoster, and other Adelaide preachers graduated. While in America he conducted services at various churches every week. While there, he served as president of the Australia Club and editor of its magazine. A highlight of his stay in America was conducting the marriage of Rev. Paternoster to Ethel Olive Waddell. He graduated in 1906, and received a call to the Church of Christ, Grote street, which he took up in February 1908, after extensive travels through Britain, Europe, Egypt and Palestine, where he toured the Holy Land.

He was minister of the Grote street church for 10 years. In 1910 the State Conference of the Churches of Christ decided to send delegates to the Council of Churches in South Australia. In 1912 he was elected president of the Council. He was also president of the State and Federal Churches of Christ Conferences, and Grand Chaplain of the Loyal Orange Institution in South Australia. In January 1912 he was elected to succeed David Amos Ewers (died 1915) as editor The Australian Christian, however that appointment was trumped by his call to the Lygon Street Church of Christ in Melbourne. He baptised over 600 persons, and under his lead the church congregation became the largest in Australia.

He started at Lygon Street, Carlton, on 18 June 1916. In 1918 he was elected president of the Council of Churches in Victoria. In September 1921 Thomas accepted an invitation to conduct the 75th anniversary services of his old Grote Street church, on 16 October.

After some seven years in the city and looking for a change, he took the new church at Balwyn, which within five years had a membership of 300 and a similar number of children attending Sunday school. He remained there for 13 years, then in 1936 retired to embark on mission work in Western Australia, preaching in Fremantle, Maylands, Subiaco, Hollywood (northern Nedlands), and Victoria Park.

In February 1937 Thomas and his wife left for India, where his son Colin Thomas, a missionary for the Churches of Christ in Baramati, was to be married to Jean Dare; they returned to Melbourne in May. By July he was back in Adelaide, where he preached in the Norwood tabernacle and at tent meetings at Forestville, then on 28 August he conducted an Endeavour rally at the Unley, South Australia Church of Christ. On 11 September 1937 he preached to a crowded Adelaide Town Hall, then two days later was on the train to Melbourne, to attend the Victorian State conference.

In 1938 he accepted a call to the Williamstown church, but was forced to delay his appointment to December, as he was required urgently to help out at Invermay, Tasmania. Around April 1944 he was forced by ill health to suspend active ministry and resigned in October 1944. He died at the Epworth Hospital, and after a funeral service at the Lygon Street church, and his remains interred at the Box Hill Cemetery.

== Family ==
Thomas married Hilda Anne Verco (18 March 1878 – November 1970), granddaughter of James Crabb Verco, on 21 November 1906. They had three sons and one daughter.

- Alan James Verco Thomas (1908– ) and his mother were executors of J. E. Smith's will. He was listed in the documents as a chemist.
- Colin George Verco Thomas (1910 – November 1991) was a preacher at West Preston Churches of Christ, later a missionary to India.
- Ruth Hilda Verco Thomas (1912– )
- Donald Albert Verco Thomas (8 April 1915 – 1995) was in 1944 a POW in Malaya.

In 1940 they had a home at 97 Esplanade, Williamstown, Victoria. His wife's address in 1945 was 1434 High Street, Malvern, Victoria.
