= Evangelical Theological Association =

Coordinates: 37°48′20.27″S 145°02′12.20″E

The Evangelical Theological Association (ETA) was a cooperative partnership established in 1975 between the Churches of Christ Theological College and Whitley College. It was accredited as an associated teaching institute of the Melbourne College of Divinity. The ETA taught undergraduate and postgraduate theology courses, for degrees awarded by the Melbourne College of Divinity. It was disbanded in 2005 when both the constituent colleges became independent Registered Teaching Institutions of the MCD.
