= Collins Street Baptist Church =

- Collins Street Baptist Church
- Collins Street Baptist Church
- 37°48′53″S 144°58′04″E
- Address: 174 Collins Street, Melbourne, Victoria
- Country: Australia
- Denomination: Baptist
- Website: www.csbc.org.au

History
- Status: Church
- Founded: 1843
- Consecrated: 1862

Architecture
- Architect: Joseph Reed
- Style: Greek Revival

Collins Street Baptist Church is a Baptist church, located at 174 Collins Street, Melbourne, Victoria, Australia. The church is affiliated with the Australian Baptist Ministries. Founded in 1843, it is the oldest Baptist church in Victoria and the oldest continuous Baptist church in Australia.

== History ==
The first Baptist service in Melbourne was held in 1838 in a tent on a vacant allotment of land opposite the present church and where the Regent Theatre now stands. The first chapel was built on the current site in 1845. In the late 1850s it was decided to enlarge the building. The current church, opened in 1862, was designed by Reed & Barnes. Joseph Reed, was the architect who later designed the Melbourne Town Hall and several other prominent Melbourne churches. Unlike most Melbourne churches of the period, which are either Gothic or Romanesque, Collins Street Baptist is in the form of a classical temple, with four Corinthian columns facing the street. According to the church's website, this "reflects the Baptist understanding of the church as a gathered community of believers rather than as a special building".

== Building ==
In conformity with the Baptist dislike of decoration in churches, the interior has plain plastered walls. It has arched moulded windows, a double aisle and side seats facing the pulpit. A central raised pulpit emphasises the stress in Baptist theology on the Word of God being read and preached as central features of the services of worship. Seating is arranged in a "U" shape around the central axis determined by the pulpit and the Communion table. There is no form of decoration other than some detail in the windows and carving on the pulpit and Communion furniture. Traditionally, no cross or symbol appears in the church though that has changed today.

Early Baptist tradition also disapproved of music in churches, but in 1854 a small organ was installed. In 1885 a larger organ was installed which was restored and expanded in 1974.

The church land grant extended through to 203 Little Collins Street, where a meeting room called Central Hall was built in 1852. This was replaced in 1928 by an extension of the Victoria Palace hotel next door on Little Collins Street, with a new Central Hall on the ground level. In 1929 a second new building was built by the church on the small remaining area between the rear of the church and the hotel, accessed by a long corridor off Collins Street, where a small shop was also built. Called Central House, the new building was used in part for church facilities, and part for rent.

== People ==
The first minister was the Rev. John Ham (1797–1852) of Sydney, who preached in Melbourne from 1842 to 1847. His stipend was "not less than £120 a year". His successor was Rev. James Taylor of Birmingham, who held the pulpit for ten years at a salary of £650 a year, at the time considered a very large stipend. Rev. James Martin of Nottingham was minister from 1869 to 1877, Samuel Chapman of Glasgow (on £1000 a year) from 1877 to 1899, S. Pearce Carey from 1900 to 1908, F. C. Spurr from 1909 to 1914, and T. E. Ruth from 1914 to 1923.

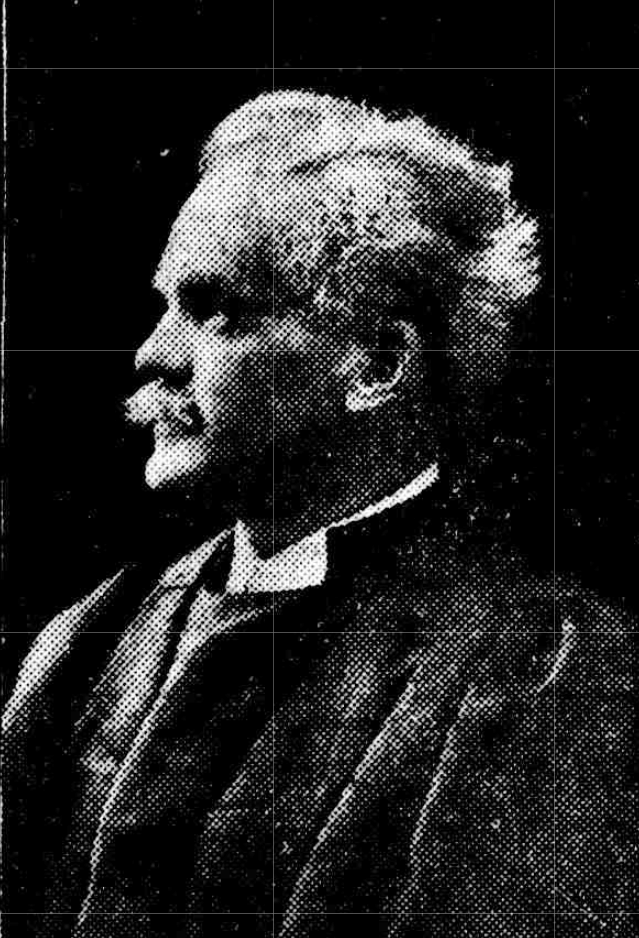
Thomas Elias Ruth

Thomas Elias Ruth (1875–1956) was born in Devonshire and studied for holy orders in the Church of England but became a fervent Baptist. He arrived at Collins Street in March 1914. Famously open-minded, he switched to the Congregational Church, Pitt Street Sydney in 1923. He retired to South Australia in 1938 but died in Sydney.

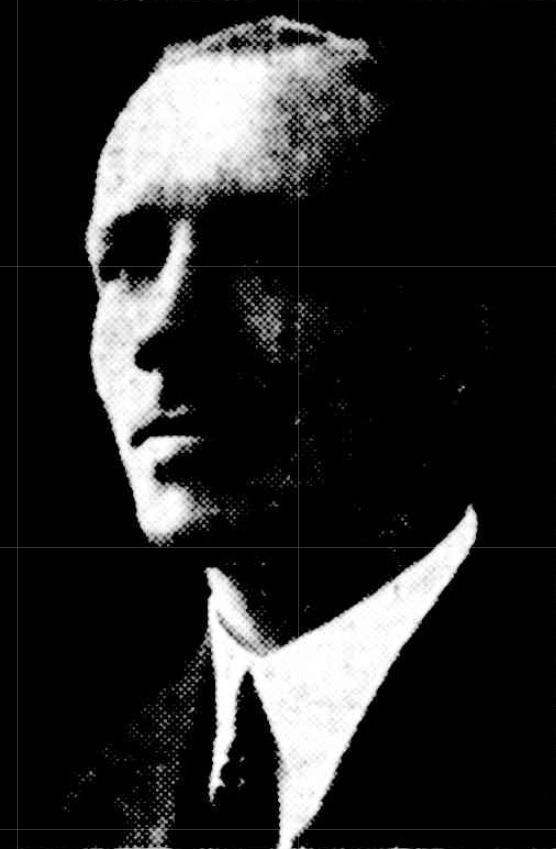
W. Dodds Jackson

William Dodds Jackson (1893–1980) was born in Worcester, son of Forbes Jackson, onetime principal of Harley College, who died in 1913 after being set upon by suffragettes who mistook him for Lloyd George. He was educated at Cooper's Company School, London, and gained his B.A. degree at Bristol Baptist College and fought with distinction in the Royal Field Artillery during the WWI. He sailed for Australia aboard SS Aeneas, and began preaching at Collins Street in September 1924. He was still occasionally preaching in the 1960s, but died in England.

Ronald Ham (1929–2015), appointed in 1981, was the first Australian-born minister of the church. Rowena Curtis, appointed in 2000, was the first woman. Tim Costello joined the pastoral team in 2005 to provide leadership to the church's Urban Mission Unit, later known as Urban Seed.

In 2010, Simon Carey Holt became pastor and served as pastor until November 2025. Holt was previously a faculty member of Whitley College, a Baptist theological college in Melbourne, teaching in spirituality, ethics and pastoral theology. He is the author of several books including God Next Door: Spirituality and Mission in the Neighbourhood (2007), Eating Heaven: Spirituality at the Table (2013) and Heaven All Around Us: Discovering God in Everyday Life (2018). He died on 25 August 2026.. Rev Carolyn Francis now serves as Interim Pastor.

Several historically notable people have been members of the church. During the early 20th century numerous women active in the Victorian women's movement were members, including Cecilia Downing, Margaret McLean and Bessie Rees. The politicians Denis Lovegrove and Robert Reid were members as was the prominent Melbourne Syme family including the owner of The Age newspaper, David Syme.
