= Rowland Croucher =

Australian pastor, counsellor and author

Rowland Croucher (born 1937) is a retired Australian pastor, counsellor and author.

== Early life and education ==
He was brought up in the Open Brethren in Sydney.

Croucher graduated as a teacher from Bathurst Teachers' College; BA University of New England; LTh., Dip.RE, Melbourne College of Divinity; ordained as a Baptist pastor, NSW Baptist Theological College; Master of Education University of Sydney; (post graduate) Bachelor of Divinity MCD., Doctor of Ministry Fuller Theological Seminary.

== Personal life ==
Croucher and his wife Jan were one of the earliest couples in Australia to be ordained to ministry in Baptist churches. She had several ministries - mostly part-time or voluntary - at Heathmont, Syndal, Boronia and Doncaster East Baptist churches and was for several years also involved in prison ministry to women. She died in 2017 after 57 years of marriage. They had four children.

== Career ==
After a five-year career as a high-school teacher, Croucher began training in 1964 for the Baptist ministry in New South Wales. He worked for the InterVarsity Fellowship (1968–1970) (now the Australian Fellowship of Evangelical Students (AFES)); then pastored churches in Australia: Narwee and Central Baptist Church - both in Sydney - and Blackburn Baptist Church in Melbourne, which became a "megachurch" in the late 1970s, with seven pastors, a salaried staff of 25 and 1,000 attending; plus several interim ministries. He was then, briefly, pastor at First Baptist Church, Vancouver, Canada. From 1983 to 1991 he worked for World Vision Australia.

Since 1991, Croucher has been founding director of John Mark Ministries, serving pastors, ex-pastors, church leaders and their spouses throughout Australia and elsewhere.Les Scarborough (NSW, now retired) and Psychologist/Trainer Tim Dyer (Tasmania and elsewhere) are colleagues. The John Mark Ministries website, with 20,000+ articles, claims to be one of the most accessed non-denominational religious websites in Australia.

In 2011, Croucher added his voice to those of other Christian leaders calling for the introduction of same-sex marriage in Australia.

== Books ==
- Questions and Responses, Vol 1, (Bayswater, VIC: Coventry Books, 2018; ISBN 9 780648 323310)
- Recent Trends Among Evangelicals, (Sydney: Albatross Books and Kent: MARC Europe, 1986; ISBNs 0 86760 025 X and 0 947697 45 4)
- Still Waters Deep Waters: Meditations and Prayers for Busy People (Sydney: Albatross Books and Herts: Lion Publishing, 1987; ISBNs 0 86760 031 4 and 0 7459 1187 0)
- High Mountains Deep Valleys: Meditations and Prayers for the Down Times (Sydney: Albatross Books and Herts: Lion Publishing, 1991; ISBNs 0 86760 090 X and 0 7459 1299 0)
- Rivers in the Desert: Meditations and Prayers for Refreshment (Sydney: Albatross Books and Herts: Lion Publishing, 1991; ISBNs 0 86760 137 X and 0 7459 1709 7)
- Gentle Darkness: Meditations and Prayers for Illumination (Sydney: Albatross Books and Herts: Lion Publishing, 1994; ISBNs 0 7324 1007 X and 0 7459 2431 X)
- A Garden of Solitude: Meditations and Prayers for Encouragement (Sydney: Albatross Books and Herts: Lion Publishing, 1998; with bibliography and index to all five volumes in this series: ISBN 0-7324-1074-6)
- Grow! Meditations and Prayers for New Christians (Melbourne: JBCE, 1992; ISBN 0-85819-822-3)
- Live! More Meditations and Prayers for New Christians (Melbourne: JBCE, 1993; ISBN 0-85819-881-9)
- The Best of GRID (with Grace Thomlinson): Leadership, Ministry and Mission in a Changing World (Melbourne: World Vicion of Australia, 1993; ISBN 1-875140-11-5)
- Your Church Can Come Alive (Melbourne: JBCE, 1991; ISBN 0-85819-809-6)
- Sunrise Sunset: Prayers and Meditations for Every Day of the Year (HarperCollins, 1995; ISBN 1-86371-402-2)
- The Family: At Home in a Heartless World (HarperCollins 1995; ISBN 1-86371-389-1)
