= G. A. Judkins =

Australian Methodist minister

George Alfred Judkins (13 March 1871 – 8 October 1958) was a Methodist minister in Tasmania and Victoria, Australia. He was a tireless worker for temperance, Sunday observance, and other Methodist strictures.

== History ==
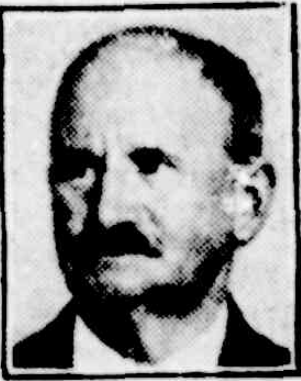
George A. Judkins

Judkins was born in Glendaruel, Victoria, Australia, also referred to as Coghills Creek, near Clunes, Victoria; a son of Henry Judkins (c. 1837 – 14 April 1929) and Eliza Judkins, née Ward ( – 11 June 1889), devout Methodist schoolteachers who migrated to Australia from Aylesbury, Buckinghamshire, England.

He is believed to have attended Sheepwash (Tourello) School where his father was headmaster and his mother also taught. He joined the Railways Department as a telegraphist and while still a teenager was a lay preacher at the Ballarat goldfields. He was engaged as a preacher by Methodist churches in Coleraine and Katamatite on a trial basis before in 1892 enrolling as a theology student at Queen's College, Melbourne. His first posting after ordination was to Queenstown, Tasmania 1897–1899, then returned to Victoria, where his first postings were to Richmond 1899–1900, Yarram 1901–1903, Bendigo 1904–1907, Echuca 1908–1910 and Horsham 1911–1913.

In 1914 he was appointed to the Neil Street Methodist Church, Ballarat. Throughout the Great War he displayed unswerving loyalty to Great Britain and support for Australia's involvement, and was on the side of conscription when the supply of fresh volunteers began to wane. He opposed Irish nationalism, considering it part of the Roman Catholic church war against Protestantism. During the 1917 conscription campaign he supported the Orange cause, claiming that Romanism and nationalism were irreconcilable.

He was a Methodist delegate to the Victorian Council of Churches, and elected its president in 1922, He was elected secretary in 1925 succeeding Rev. J. Ernest James; he held the post till 1945.

In 1925 he was appointed director of the newly formed Methodist social services department. For fourteen years he toured Victoria, railing against dilution of Victorian-era moral standards. His powerful personality and fiery rhetoric intimidated politicians from adopting reforms seen elsewhere in Australia, gaining for Victoria a reputation for moral conservatism.

He was teetotal, but did not support prohibition, expecting temperance to succeed through six o'clock closing and the reduction of licensed premises through the "local option" — the number and location of licensed premises being decided by town councils.

He campaigned against public transport operating on Sundays, which might encourage church attendance but would encourage frivolous pursuits such as family visits and bushwalking.

== Last years ==
Judkins retired in 1939 but acted as chaplain to Epworth Hospital 1940–1949 and continued to preach at the Malvern and Canterbury churches. He died at his home on Bruce Street, Box Hill, Victoria. His remains were cremated at the Springvale Cemetery after a funeral service at Box Hill Methodist church.

== Recognition ==
In 1949 Judkins was elected life member of the Victorian Council of Churches for his long and valuable service.

== Criticism ==
Judkins drew particular ire from Smith's Weekly for his condemnation of smoking, drinking, raffles, dancing, mixed bathing, movies and jazz music, but especially for slandering Queensland women, and reviling Kingsford Smith and Don Bradman for their support of hospital lotteries.

== Family ==
Judkins married Aline May Giraoud at Richmond on 8 April 1901; they had two sons and two daughters:

- Henry G. "Harry" Judkins qualified as a medical practitioner and served as a medical missionary, superintendent of the Mission Hospital in Salamo, Papua.
- Alfred Bowden Judkins on occasion acted as church organist. He married Berta Jeanne Franklin in December 1937.
- Elvie Aline Judkins married W. Armstrong
- Clare Judkins married A. W. Mitchell

His brother William Henry Judkins (1869–1912) was also a zealous Methodist reformer.
