= J. Ernest James =

Australian minister (c.1884–1945)

John Ernest James B.D. (c. 1884 – 20 October 1945) was a Congregational minister in Australia, remembered as preacher at the Collins Street Independent Church, Melbourne for ten years.

== History ==
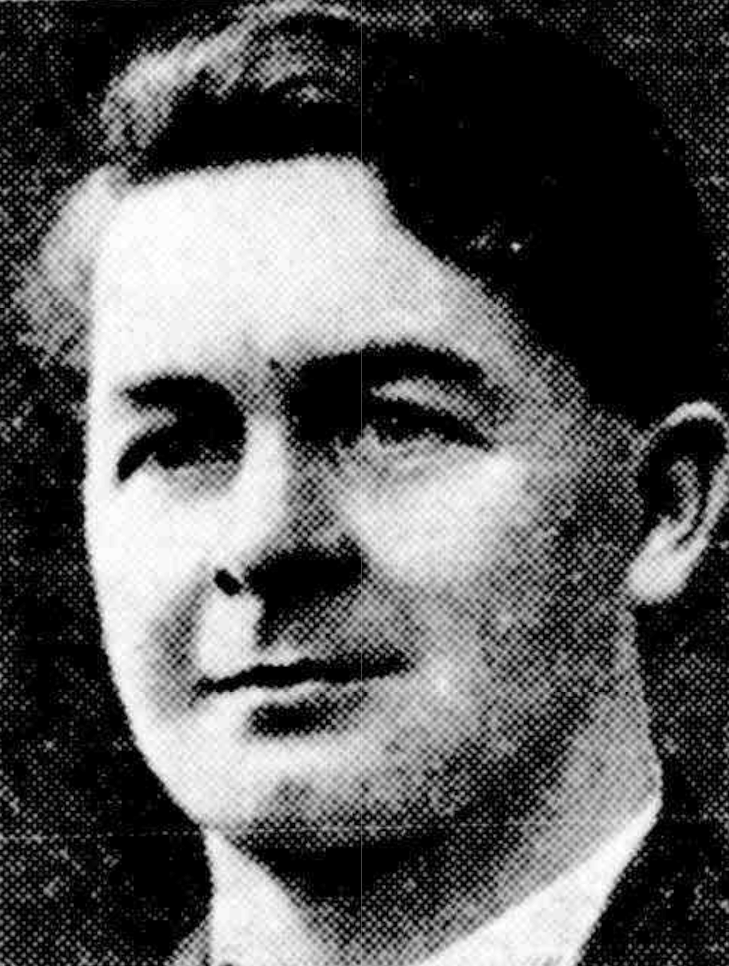
J. Ernest James

James was born and educated in Pembroke, Wales, a son of a son of Elizabeth James and William James of Monkston Senior School, later of Culver Park, Tenby, before gaining his Bachelor of Divinity at the Congregational New College, London University in Hampstead.

Following an approach by Joseph Vardon, who was in London for the 1910 coronation of George V, James accepted a call to the Manthorpe Memorial Congregational Church of Unley Road, Unley, South Australia. He married S. Winifred Redclift on 29 July 1911 and was ordained on 4 August before he left on the SS Zieten for South Australia, arriving 14 October 1911.

In 1916 he succeeded Rev. William Hawke (c. 1871 – 8 December 1946) as chairman of the S.A. Congregational Union. These were the darkest days of the Great War, when the issue of "national service" (ie conscription) was the uppermost subject in political discussion. James declared himself in favour, but agreed that the council should not hold the Church to either side of such a divisive proposition.

While in South Australia he visited Kadina, a town known for its Welsh heritage, where he gave a spirited lecture on David Lloyd George, "the most hated man of his generation, . . . also the best loved man of his day".

In August 1917 he accepted a call to the Independent (ie. Congregational) Church, Collins street, Melbourne and left for his new post on 20 October, joining the Melbourne Express at the Mount Lofty railway station.

James became chairman of the Victorian Congregational Union in 1920

He was elected president of the Council of Churches in Victoria in 1920.

In 1927 he succeeded F. V. Dowling (died 25 April 1930) as chairman of the Congregational Union of Australia and New Zealand.

The fortunes of the Collins Street Congregational Church soared during his pastorate. Church membership grew by three or four hundred, and church debt had been wiped out. The pews were filled to overflowing for most services, and on occasion the doors had to be closed to visitors.

In 1927 he accepted the invitation to the pastorate of Kensington Chapel, London, and preached his last sermon in Melbourne on 5 February 1928. He left for London on the SS Jervis Bay three days later.

He next went to Castlegate Church, Nottingham, finally to Glasgow, Scotland, where he died suddenly.

== Recognition ==
James's service to the Congregational churches in Australia is recognised by a stained-glass window at the Unley Uniting Church and a brass plaque at St Michael's Uniting Church, Melbourne.

== Family ==
James married S. Winifred Redclift on 29 July 1911. They had a son and a daughter.

His siblings included Constance Mary James (c. 1900 – 5 April 1917), Charles Evelyn James (born c. 1882 (Note: From army records: 33 years old in December 1915)), married Mabel Edith Gurner of Kensington, South Australia in 1919; Stanley James of Kensington Park, South Australia, and a Miss W. James, about whom nothing has been found.
