= Frederic C. Spurr =

Frederic Chambers Spurr (c. 1861 – 11 September 1942) was an English minister of the Baptist church, remembered in Australia as pastor of Melbourne's Collins Street Baptist Church.

== History ==
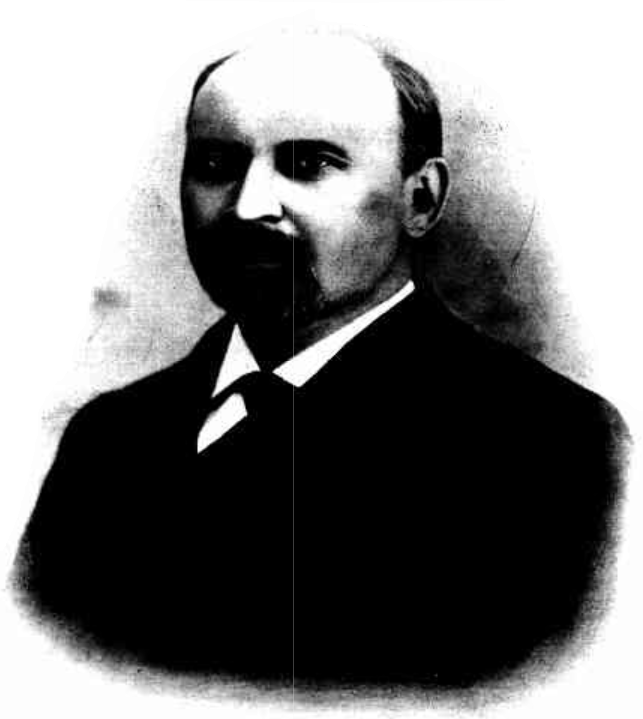
Rev. Frederic C. Spurr

Spurr was born in Nottingham, where his memories of public drunkenness underpinned his lifelong abstention from alcohol. As a youth he prepared for confirmation in the High Church, but was deflected by friends to the Plymouth Brethren, from which he veered to the Particular Baptists and Rev. C. H. Spurgeon's Metropolitan Tabernacle.

He began his ministry at Longcross Street Baptist Church, Cardiff, in 1886, doing much good work with discharged prisoners, then in 1890 worked with F. B. Meyer's Forward Movement for five years and became a missioner to the Baptist Union of Great Britain and Ireland, working for another nine years. He was pastor of Maze Pond chapel, Old Kent Road, Southwark, from around 1903 to 1908, then accepted a call to the Collins Street Baptist Church, Melbourne, as a replacement for S. Pearce Carey.

He arrived in Adelaide by the RMS Mooltan on 15 May 1909, accompanied by his wife and two children, after stopping at Fremantle. He sent his impressions of those cities back to the London press, for whom he was a regular contributor. On 17 May they proceeded to Melbourne by the Melbourne Express. He returned to Adelaide 17–24 September 1909.

Spurr was conversant with the great scientific advances of the day, and was able to accommodate these findings within a context of Biblical teaching. Great crowds came to Collins Street to hear Spurr preach: seatholders were admitted via a side door fifteen minutes before the service, then at the appointed hour the main doors were opened and the church was quickly filled.

In 1912 he was elected president of the Council of Churches in Victoria, succeeded by Alex McCallum, who later spoke of the admiration felt for Spurr by Christians of all denominations.

Spurr left Australia by the SS Maloja on 10 February 1914. He was in Switzerland when the European war broke out, and promptly returned to England.

His replacement at Collins Street Baptist Church was Rev. T. E. Ruth (1875–1956), who resigned in 1922 to take the Pitt Street Congregational Church, Sydney.

Back in England, he became president of the National Free Church Council.

== Spiritualism ==
Their youngest son Anthony, who was born in Melbourne, drowned in England aged about three or four, during a visit home by Mrs Spurr. Later Spurr had communication with his son through a medium. Spurr and his wife consulted William Hope of Crewe, a photographer with a reputation for capturing apparitions, and found on the photographic plate a recognizable image of their son. They had no doubts as to its authenticity; Spurr insists that Hope asked no payment for his services. In the early decades of the 20th-century, Spiritualism was a respectable subject for discussion and not incompatible with Protestant Christian theology.

Spurr retired to his home in Birmingham.

== Publications ==
- "The Minister of the Future". The Christian Colonist. Vol. IX, no. 2. South Australia. 8 October 1886. p. 5 – via National Library of Australia.
- The Christian Use of Leisure (1900)
- The Master Key: A Study in World Problems (1910)
- Death and the Life Beyond: in the light of modern religious thought (1913)
- Five Years Under the Southern Cross: Experiences and Impressions (1915)
- Some Chaplains in Khaki: An Account of the Work of Chaplains of the United Navy and Army Board (1920)
- For Love's Sake (1922)
- Jesus Christ and the Modern Challenge (1923)
- Sermon Substance. A Preacher's Notes for One Year (1930) Outlines of 53 sermons.
- A Preacher's Note Book (1933)
- The Evangelism for Our Time (1937)
- The Evangelist at Work Today (1938)
- The Heart of a Father (published anonymously)
