= Sports chaplain =

Spiritual support and pastoral care for sportsmen and sportswomen

A sports chaplain provides pastoral care for the sports community, including athletes, coaches, administrators and their families. In 2017, a Global Summit of Sports Chaplaincy ministries defined sports chaplaincy as “ongoing pastoral and spiritual care, by permission, to those of faith or no faith, for the holistic well-being of all involved in the community of sport.” Different sports and cultures may adopt the practice of sports chaplaincy but under different titles, such as sports Mentor, life coach or character coach. Consequently, the practical outworking of sports chaplaincy in wide in scope, but broadly fits into 5 models of delivery and is primarily a relational approach.

Sports chaplains come from various walks of life. Most commonly, they are ministers or full-time Christian workers but chaplaincy work is done without charge or financial remuneration. Often, chaplains to a particular sport are former participants in that sport. This helps the chaplain to not only provide spiritual support and guidance to a player, but helps them relate to the challenges facing the participant.

== Development of sports chaplaincy ==
Chaplains to sports communities have existed since the middle of the 20th century and have significantly grown in the 1990s and 2000s. The United States, the United Kingdom, New Zealand, and Australia have well established Christian sports chaplaincy ministries. Since 2015 further sports chaplaincy ministries have developed in Hong Kong, France, Nederlands, South Africa, Guatemala, and Argentina.

In 1982 a congress held in Hong Kong on sports mission saw sports chaplains and those interested in mission to people engaged in sports come together from around the world including recognised representatives from North and South America, Europe, Africa, Asia, the Indian subcontinent and Australasia. It was this congress that created the inspiration to further develop or initiate national sports missions and sports chaplaincies.

Resulting from this, the Major Sports Events Chaplaincy Committee was formed in 1990 to serve the IOC and International Paralympic Committee with the provision of sports chaplains. The provision of sports chaplains peaked at the London 2012 Olympics where 193 chaplains were appointed.

In 2014 a summit of sports chaplain practitioners met in Hong Kong to formalize sports chaplaincy. Subsequent summits were held in Charlotte, NC 2017 - 18 with leaders from sports chaplaincy agencies Athletes in Action and Fellowship of Christian Athletes - the Global Sports Chaplaincy Association was formed, alongside a worldwide sports chaplain registry developed by CEDE SPORTS. The registry estimates as of 2018 there are over 10,000 sports chaplains globally, represented in over 50 countries.

Since 2010 there has been a growth in the provision of chaplaincy to women's sport and paralympic sport.

== United States ==
The USA has various sport related chaplaincy organizations. Along with major denominations, ministry groups such as Athletes in Action and Fellowship of Christian Athletes also provide chaplains to various sports at the collegiate and professional levels. Every major professional sport in the United States has at least some sports chaplaincy. Some sports are more coordinated;

- Major League Baseball served by Baseball Chapel
- National Hockey League served by Hockey Ministries International,
- NASCAR served by Motor Racing Outreach and CEDE Sports

But most are far more loosely structured, with each chaplain having a program that best suits their team and individual situation. Most MLB, NFL, NBA & Major League Soccer franchises have a chaplain. Due to financial constraints, very few chaplains travel with their teams. In some cases, especially when an individual coach understands the value of the chaplain to their team, the coach may invite the chaplain to come on a road trip. This happens far more frequently when a team is traveling a short distance to a neighboring city by bus or motor coach, but in some cases, coaches have paid (out of their own pocket) to bring a chaplain on a road trip.

In recent years, much more work is being done by chaplains in specific sports to coordinate and work together so that their players can have support and encouragement from a chaplain even when they are "on the road".

In addition, the US Olympic Team travels with one or more chaplains, primarily to provide emotional support to the athletes.

== United Kingdom ==
Sports Chaplaincy UK, formerly known as SCORE, was established in 1991 under the guidance and direction of the Baptist Union of Great Britain to use the specialist experience of one of their ministers to pioneer sports chaplaincy and sports ministry.

Since 2011, the organization has operated under the name Sports Chaplaincy UK. The Christian charity provides more than 500 chaplains across a range of sports and settings, particularly in football, rugby union, rugby league, cricket, and horse racing. It also supplied more than 40 chaplains for the 2012 London Olympics. The organization states that its chaplains offer pastoral and spiritual support on a non-judgmental and non-sectarian basis, working with players, coaches, staff, and wider sporting communities.

== Australia ==
As a direct result of the Hong Kong 1982 Congress on Sports Mission, pioneered by Mark Tronson, the Australian Heads of Churches approved a Sports Chaplaincy mission, which was named the 'Sports and Leisure Ministry' (SLM). It was initially housed within the well established InterChurch Trade and Industry Mission (ITIM). In 1985 Australian Heads of Churches gave SLM its independence and in 1987 its Heads of Churches appointed board members adopted incorporation. In 2000 Heads of Churches released its founder, Mark Tronson, to establish Well-Being Australia, specialising in athlete respite. Five years later in 2005 SLM changed its name to Sports Chaplaincy Australia (SCA).

As a result of its solid foundation under Australian Heads of Churches, SLM (now SCA) has seen many professional sports in Australia adopt sport chaplains. Over 600 chaplains now serve in sports and sport organizations such as cricket, motor racing, tennis, rugby league, basketball, baseball, soccer, golf, yachting, skiing, netball, rodeo and horse racing, the Australian Institute of Sport, and State Institutes of Sport.

== New Zealand ==
In 2006 Ross Georgiou returned to New Zealand after having lived in Europe for a decade. He wanted to serve sports people in a meaningful way that made sense in his culture. A year later, Ross was invited to visit Sports Chaplaincy Australia and undergo their training. The vision and stories motivated him to see sports chaplaincy grow from a few isolated sports chaplains to a national ministry. Andrew Kerr was of a kindred spirit. Together they initially worked tirelessly to set up Engage, a ministry whereby key ministries and Churches across New Zealand served the 2011 Rugby World Cup. One of the key ministries was chaplaincy to the 20 rugby teams from around the world. Through a great relationship with Martin Snedden (CEO of the 2011 Rugby World Cup), 19 of the 20 teams had chaplains or 'on-call chaplains'. Chaplains were sourced globally and through the partnership with the Heads of Churches in NZ, headed up by chairman, Ken Harrison.

Both prior to and after the 2011 Rugby World Cup, sports chaplains were being identified, trained, appointed and guided in NZ with the support of SCA. In 2013 Ross Georgiou began to recruit a Governance Board and together they drew-up the Trust Deed and registered the Charity as an Incorporated Society and Charitable Trust. (Sports Chaplaincy New Zealand Charitable Trust, CC 49430, 05/08/2013).

Sports Chaplaincy New Zealand serves professional sports people, regional, club, and school level. Its registered purpose is: "To identify, train, appoint, and guide dedicated chaplains to serve athletes and teams at all levels across New Zealand." It has men, women, European NZ, Maori, Pacific Island and disability chaplains. Their byline is "ko te manaaki i ngā kaihākinakina | caring for New Zealand's sports community".

2011 Rugby World Cup http://sportschaplaincy.co.nz/2011 Rugby World Cup

== South Africa ==
Sports Chaplaincy South Africa (SCZA) was formed in 2015 following the appointment of Bruce Nadin as Chaplain to Ajax Cape Town Football Club. This curriculum for training was adapted from the New Zealand model to a South African context.

Since its formation, SCZA has run numerous training events across South Africa and now has over 25 accredited Sports Chaplains serving in 8 Cities. Sports served include Pro-Football & Rugby, Varsity sport, All-ability sport, Schools Sport and Life Saving.

== Patron saint of athletes, athletics, and sports ==
See: St. Sebastian
