= S. Pearce Carey =

English Baptist minister

Samuel Pearce Carey (1862–1953) was an English Baptist minister, pastor of the Collins Street Baptist Church in Melbourne, Victoria from 1900 to 1909.

== History ==
Carey was born in England's Black Country, son of a Baptist minister and grandson of William Carey who founded the Indian Missions. His given names were a tribute to the "seraphic" Samuel Pearce. He grew up in Devon and was educated at Blundell's School, famously attended by Frederick Temple, the Archbishop of Canterbury and R. D. Blackmore, author of Lorna Doone. He was trained for the ministry at Regent's Park College, the costs being covered by a scholarship, and won prizes for Greek and Hebrew studies.

He took his MA at the University of London, then was pastor of the Baptist church in Burnley, followed by Wolverhampton, where his father had for many years been pastor, and where he became a close friend of the Rev. Dr Charles Albert Berry. He was next pastor of Woodgate Baptist Church, Loughborough, Leicestershire, and was there in 1899 when he was chosen to succeed Samuel Chapman (1831–1899) as minister of the Collins Street Baptist Church. He and Mrs Carey arrived in Melbourne by the steamer Oroya in May 1900 and preached his first sermon on 27 May. He was nominated by his church as a delegate to the Victorian Council of Churches, of which body he was elected president in 1902 and again in 1908.

In October 1903 he created a furor by resigning his pastorate, following a dispute with some church officials, details not found. He was persuaded to withdraw his notice.

In 1908 he resigned in order to pursue other interests in England, and left in early 1909. He was succeeded at Collins Street church in 1909 by Frederic C. Spurr.

== Publications ==
- Carey, S. Pearce - William Carey "The Father of Modern Missions", edited by Peter Masters, Wakeman Trust, London, 1993 ISBN 1-870855-14-0
