= Morling College - Perth Vose Campus =

Baptist college in Bentley, Western Australia

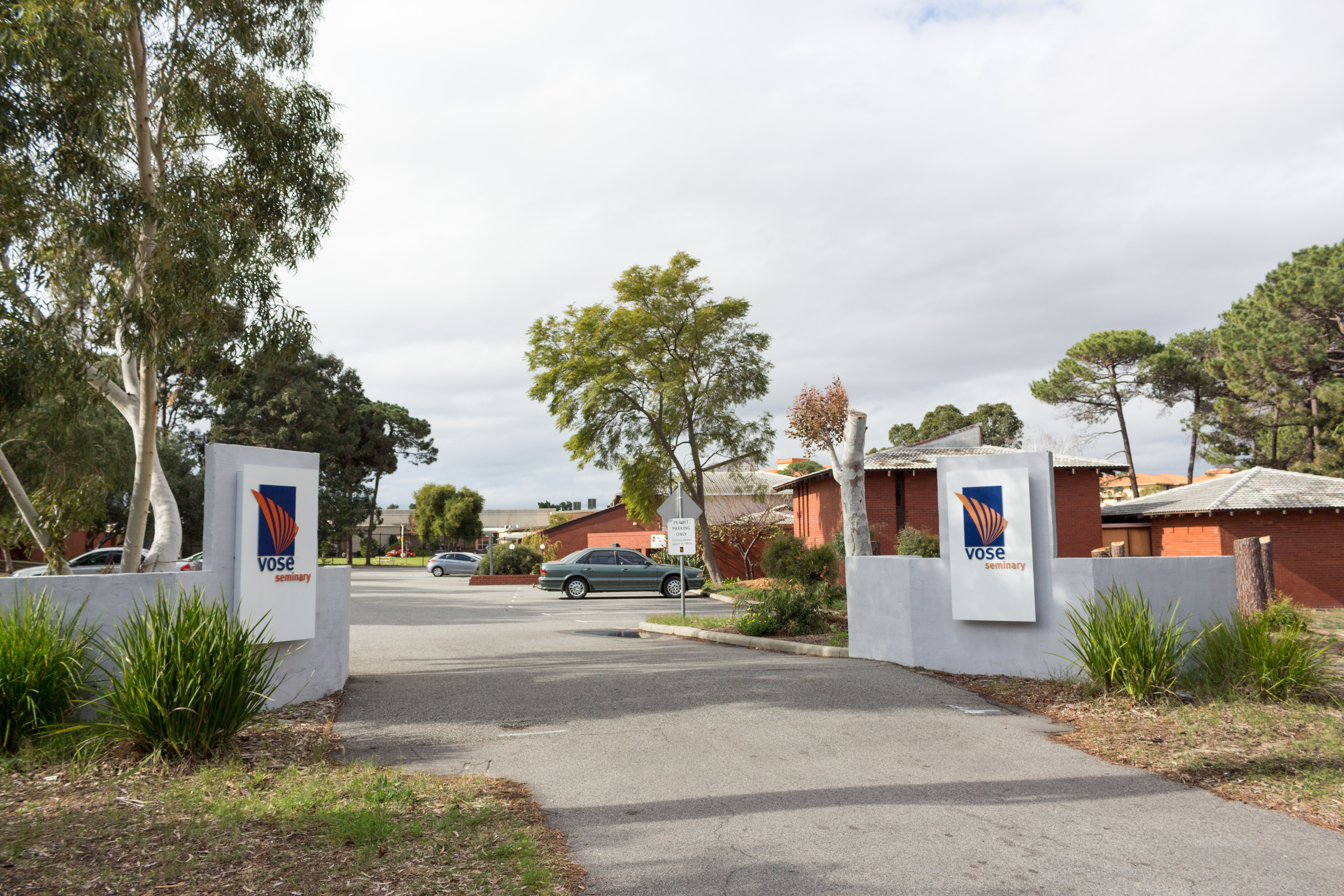
- The main entrance to the seminary
- Former names: Baptist Theological College of Western Australia (1963-2007), Vose Seminary (2008-2020)
- Type: Seminary
- Established: 1963
- Affiliations: Australian Baptist Ministries
- Academic affiliations: Australian College of Theology
- Location: Western Australia, Western Australia; 32°00′06.73″S 115°53′46.9″E
- Website: www.morling.edu.au

Morling College - Perth Vose Campus is a Baptist college located in Bentley, Western Australia. The college is associated with the Baptist Union of Western Australia (Australian Baptist Ministries).

== History ==
In 1957, the Baptist Churches in Western Australia, under the leadership of Noel Vose, prepared plans for the establishment of the seminary. Opening in March 1963, with Vose as founding Principal, the seminary began classes as the Baptist Theological College of Western Australia in temporary accommodation in Nedlands. In November 1967 a permanent, purpose built facility was opened on land purchased in the Collier Pine Plantation opposite what is now Curtin University in the suburb of Bentley. It was renamed from the Baptist Theological College of Western Australia to Vose Seminary in 2008 to honour the significant contributions of both Noel Vose, the founding principal, and his wife Heather Vose. In 2021, Vose Seminary became a campus of the Morling College.

== Leadership ==
Noel Vose was the founding principal (1963-1991) and only faculty member until the arrival of John Olley (an Old Testament specialist), in 1978, and Richard Moore (New Testament), in 1979. Upon Noel Vose's retirement in January 1991, John Olley was appointed as the second Principal of the Seminary. In 2004, Brian Harris was appointed Principal.

== Academic affiliation ==
The seminary associated with Murdoch University in 1985, which allowed the seminary to offer higher degrees up to PhD. In 2003, the seminary transitioned from its affiliation with Murdoch University to being accredited through the Australian University of Theology.

=== Student awards and prizes ===
Each year, the Seminary awards prizes for specific student achievements. These include: the Dux Award, for the student graduating with the highest GPA; the Department of Biblical Studies award, sponsored by Riverton Baptist Church, for the highest grade in two advanced units in the Department of Biblical Studies; the Department of Christian thought, sponsored by Perth Baptist Church, for the highest average grade in two advanced units in the Department of Christian Thought; the Department of Ministry and Practice Award, sponsored by Katanning Baptist Church, for the highest grade in two advanced units in the Department of Ministry and Practice; the Encouragement Award, for a student who has shown progress in studies; and the College Prize, for all-around progress and performance in studies and contribution to Seminary life.

Vose Seminary also awards annual prizes for Excellence in Writing and Excellence in Preaching, named after the American theologian and writer, Frederick Buechner.

== Sources ==
- Hobby, N., J. Olley and M. O'Neil (eds) (2013). Vose Seminary at Fifty: From "Preach the Word" to "Come Grow". Preston, Vic.: Mosaic Press.
- Moore, R.K. (1991). Baptists of Western Australia: The First Ninety Years (1895-1985). Perth: The Baptist Historical Society of WA.
- Moore, R.K. (1996), All Western Australia is my Parish: A Centenary History of the Baptist Denomination in Western Australia (1895-1995), Perth: The Baptist Historical Society of WA
