= UTS =

UTS or Uts may refer to:

== Organizations ==
- University of Technology Sarawak, Malaysia
- University of Technology Sydney, Australia
- Unification Theological Seminary, of the Unification Church, New York, US
- Union Theological Seminary (Philippines), Protestant seminary
- Union Theological Seminary (New York City), US
- University of Toronto Schools, Canada
- Universal Technical Systems, the current developer of mathematical modeling software TK Solver

== Science and technology ==
- Ultimate tensile strength, of a material
- Uner Tan syndrome
- Unified Thread Standard, a standard for threaded fasteners
- Untriseptium, symbol Uts, a hypothetical chemical element
- UTAS UTS-15, a Turkish pump-action shotgun

=== Computing ===
- Unicode Technical Standard
- Universal Time-Sharing System, an operating system for XDS Sigma computers
- UNIX Time-Sharing System, an alternative name used for Research Unix
- UTS, one type of namespace in Linux
- Amdahl UTS, a Unix operating system for IBM-compatible mainframes

== Transportation ==
- Huntsville Regional Airport in Huntsville, Texas (FAA ID)
- Ust-Tsilma Airport, IATA: UTS
- University Transit Service, a transportation operator of the University of Virginia
- Underground Ticketing System, as used in the London Underground

== Other uses ==
- Uts (river), a river in Belarus
- Ultimate Tennis Showdown
