= Australian College of Ministries =

- Sydney College of Divinity
- Location: Rhodes, Sydney, New South Wales, Australia
- Coordinates: 27°36′34.74″S 153°08′07.73″E
- Abbreviation: ACOM
- Established: 1999 (Forebears: 1941)
- Former names: Kenmore Christian College (Queensland); Churches of Christ Theological College (New South Wales); Stirling Theological College (Victoria)
- Status: Open
- Website: acom.edu.au

The Australian College of Ministries (ACOM) is an interdenominational Evangelical theological institute (80% owned by Churches of Christ in NSW/ACT and 20% owned by the Christian and Missionary Alliance) based in Rhodes, New South Wales, Sydney, Australia. It is a member institution of the Sydney College of Divinity.

== History ==
The college was formed as the result of the 1999 merger of Kenmore College (Queensland) and the Churches of Christ Theological College (New South Wales).

In 2017, the Christian & Missionary Alliance of Australia and its Alliance Institute for Mission became a member of the college.

In January 2023, Stirling Theological College discontinued its accreditation with the University of Divinity and effectively merged operations with Australian College of Ministries. Stirling's assets are managed by its existing board and its name lives on in the new ACOM 'Stirling School of Community Care' with awards in Christian Counselling, Professional Supervision and Chaplaincy.

== Programs ==
In its five schools (Bible, theology, leadership, spirituality and the Stirling School of Community Care), ACOM employs a faculty with a focus on leadership, teaching, counselling and pastoral supervision.

== Beliefs ==
The College is owned by the Christian & Missionary Alliance of Australia and Churches of Christ in Australia NSW/ACT.

== Notable alumni ==
- Graham Joseph Hill.
