= Walter J. Eddy =

Walter John Eddy (1859 – 16 June 1947) was an Australian Baptist minister and organiser.

== History ==
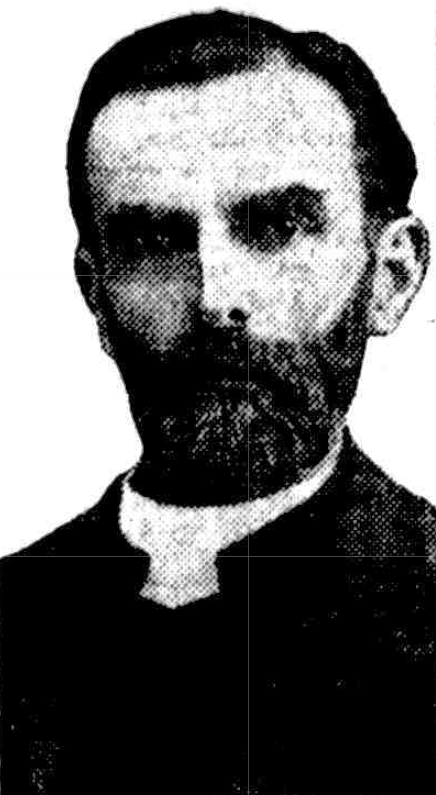
Walter J. Eddy

Eddy was a native of Liskeard, Cornwall, a son of Peter Eddy and Emma Eddy, née Mutton, and studied for the ministry at Regent's Park College, Oxford. He came to Australia in 1883, subsequently entering the Baptist ministry. He was minister of Maldon, Victoria, Daylesford, Victoria, Geelong 1888–1899, Launceston, Tasmania and Parkside, South Australia, South Yarra, and Geelong 1911.

In 1905 he was president of the South Australian Christian Endeavour Union.

He succeeded W. L. Grierson as secretary of the Council of Churches in Victoria, serving from 1909 to 1913,

In 1913 he was also involved in organising the Australian section of the Chapman-Alexander Simultaneous Mission, a world-wide revivalist crusade driven by evangelists Dr. J. Wilbur Chapman and Charles Alexander.

He was president of the Baptist Ministers' Fraternal in 1910 and president of the Baptist Union for the year 1911–1912. His move to Geelong was deferred until after the ceremony.

He was general secretary for Australia of the Mission to Lepers, (an international and inter-denominational body, later known as The Leprosy Mission and the Australian body as Leprosy Mission Australia) 1913–1931. As this is a non-denominational body, he was obliged to sever ties with the Council of Churches. He was elected general secretary for Australasia of the Sudan United Mission (also international and inter-denominational) 1932–1933, when he returned to the pulpit, at Ashburton, Victoria, which he held from 1935 to 1938.

== Recognition ==
The Walter J. Eddy Memorial Chapel for Lepers in Makutupora, Central Tanzania, was named for him and Mrs Eddy.

== Family ==
Eddy married Eliza Sarah "Lillie" Mackenzie (died 1937) on 19 November 1885. She was a daughter of Rev. J. J. Mackenzie of Prahran.

They had four daughters and two sons, Walter John Mackenzie Eddy (1897–1976) and Alan Philp Greig Eddy (22 January 1904 – 7 July 1982), an operatic baritone claimed by some, to be a cousin of Nelson Eddy. (Note: Nelson Eddy's male forbears have been traced by a genealogist: William Darius Eddy (1876–1967); Isaac Nelson Eddy (1848–1936); Darius Eddy (1813–1896); . . . Alan Eddy's grandfather has been named by another as Peter Eddy, so the claim appears unsupportable.)

They had a home at 15 Goodall Street, Auburn, Victoria.
