= Alliance Institute for Mission =

Coordinates: 35°21′0.12″S 149°3′22.52″E

- Established: 1971
- Affiliations: Christian & Missionary Alliance of Australia
- Director: Peter Laughlin
- Location: Waramanga, Canberra, Australia
- Website: www.allianceinstitute.com.au

Alliance Institute for Mission is an evangelical Christian theological institute based in Rhodes, New South Wales, Sydney, Australia. It is affiliated with the Christian & Missionary Alliance of Australia.

== History ==
In 1971, the Board of Managers of the Christian & Missionary Alliance of Australia established a TEE Programme which was named The Alliance College of Theology in 1971 in Canberra. Fifteen students were enrolled – three in Canberra, seven in Melbourne and five in Sydney.

Land was purchased at 81 Namatjira Drive, Waramanga in Canberra and the Alliance College of Theology was opened on November 20, 1977. By then, there were now full-time and part-time students attending the College as well as the continuing TEE Programme.

The College introduced a self-accredited 4 year Bachelor of Theology programme and for over 20 years effectively trained men and women for Christian ministry both within Australia and overseas. In the late 1990s, the then Director, Rev Russell Warnken, negotiated with the Sydney College of Divinity to establish an accredited 3 year Bachelor of Theology Programme at the College. This was a very successful partnership and raised both the profile and academic standard of the College.

In late 2006 the College went through a review of its ministry, its effectiveness, the needs of the churches, and how best to move into the future. Given the size of the C&MA in Australia and our ethnic and cultural diversity, there were many issues to consider in order to most effectively prepare men and women for service in the kingdom of God.

As a result of this review, a new model for ministry training was established in February 2007. Under the leadership of Rev Ming Leung and his Deputy Director Diana Williams, the College Programme sought to connect ministry training and the local church together. A partnership has been established with the Australian College of Ministries.

In 2017, the school became a member of the Australian College of Ministries and was renamed Alliance Institute for Mission.
