= A. E. Illingworth =

Australian Church of Christ minister

Arthur Ebenezer Illingworth (20 June 1868 – 16 October 1942) was an Australian Church of Christ minister.

The son of a lay preacher, land jobber and politician, he spent 20 years in Victoria, 17 in New South Wales, eight in Western Australia and five in South Australia, he was a powerful preacher and successful evangelist, and served as president of the Church of Christ Conference in each of those States, and the federal body.

== History ==
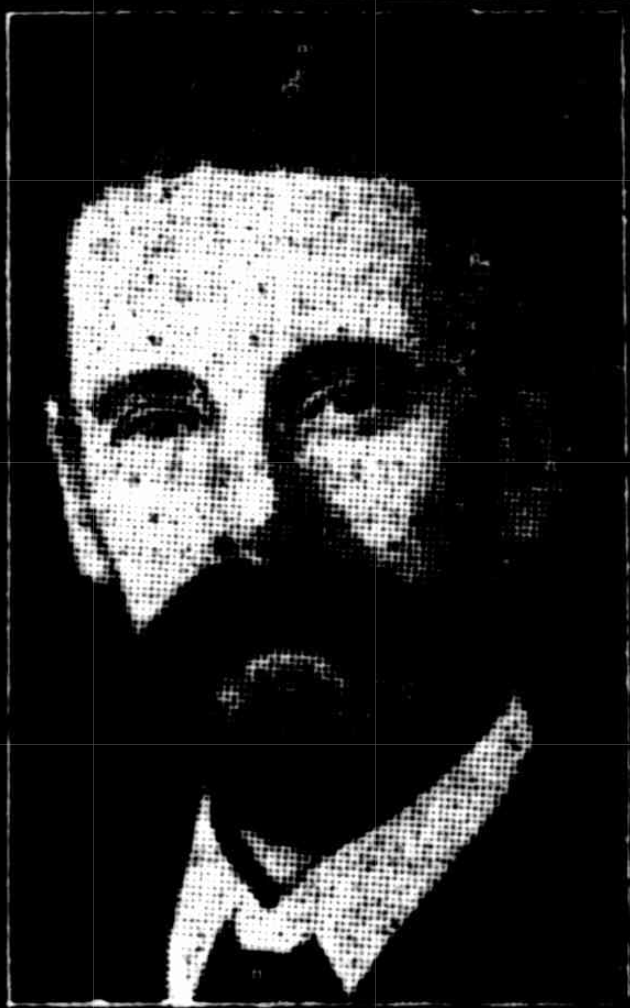
Pastor Illingworth

Illingworth was born at 289 Lygon Street, Carlton, Victoria, the only son of Frederick Illingworth (1844–1908) and Elizabeth Illingworth, née Tarry, who married on 5 September 1867. His father was a lay preacher with the Church of Christ in Dorcas Street, South Melbourne, from around 1875, moving to Sandhurst in 1886. The son studied evangelism at the Bible College in Melbourne.

Both father and son moved to Western Australia around the end of 1895, and A. E. Illingworth began preaching at the Protestant Hall, Fremantle in March 1896. His father, about whom there were stories of shady land deals with other people's money, was meanwhile settling into politics as Leader of the Opposition. In 1897 he was registered as a marriage celebrant In 1898 he was elected treasurer of the newly-established Association of Churches of Christ, and secretary in 1900, with his father as president. In 1902 he left Perth to become minister of the Cannon Street, Petersham, church and attend the seventeenth annual conference of the Churches of Christ at The Tabernacle, Metropolitan Road, Enmore. In 1908 he left Petersham for Paddington. In 1911 he was elected organising secretary of the NSW churches and transferred to the Mosman church. The following year he was elected president of the Conference of the Associated Churches of Christ in New South Wales, and transferred back to the Enmore Tabernacle. In 1915 he was elected federal president, succeeded by W. C. Brooker.

He resigned the Enmore pulpit in 1918 to take the church at Malvern, Victoria at the corner of Alma and Dandenong roads. His successor was Henry G. Harward. In April 1924, while still president of the ecumenical Council of Churches in Victoria, he was elected president of the Victorian Conference of the Churches of Christ. In September 1926 he transferred to the Church of Christ City Temple, on Campbell Street but resigned in January 1928 and returned to Melbourne, taking the Northcote pulpit. In 1931 he left Victoria for the Robert Street, Hindmarsh, South Australia, church He was elected president of the South Australian Conference in 1934. Mr and Mrs Illingworth returned to Melbourne briefly in 1934 to participate in the Centenary celebrations, briefly then permanently in 1936 to take charge of the Buckley Street, Essendon, Church. On 18 February 1942 the Illingworths celebrated their golden wedding anniversary.

He died in 1942, and after a service at the Church of Christ, Parkdale, his remains were interred at the New Cheltenham Cemetery, Holloway Road, Cheltenham, Victoria.

== Other interests ==
Illingworth represented the Churches of Christ at the ecumenical Victorian Council of Churches, and was elected its president for the year 1923–24.

== Family ==
Illingworth married Florence Newall Macgowan (1870 – 8 September 1955), at the Tabernacle, Johnston Street Fitzroy, Victoria on 18 February 1891. She was a daughter of a pharmacist and member of the church. Their children included

- Dr Harold Thorburn Illingworth (19 February 1897 – 16 March 1967), of Western Australia. He stood (unsuccessfully) against Herbert Victor Johnson (ALP) in the 1954 House of Representatives election.
- Frederick Augustus Illingworth (9 February 1900 – 13 September 1987) of Gordon & Gotch, Ltd
- Arthur Garfield Illingworth (23 April 1904 – 7 December 1996) twin son
- Clifford Newall Illingworth (23 April 1904 – 30 October 1947) married Margaret Winifred "Wynne" McKillen (1 December 1917 – 3 October 2022) at the Knox. Presbyterian Church, Ascot Vale on 1 June 1940.

In 1940 they had a home in Brewster Street, Essendon.

His last address was 22 McBean Street, Parkdale.
