= David Stow Adam =

Scottish minister and professor

- Born: 9 February 1859; Langside, Glasgow, Scotland
- Died: 31 January 1925 (aged 65); Canton (now Guangzhou), China
- Occupation: Doctor of Divinity
- Spouse: Mary Grace Paterson Adam
- Children: 1 daughter, 5 sons, including Sir Alexander Grant Duncan Adam

Academic background
- Education: University of Glasgow

Academic work
- Discipline: Theologian, Minister, Chair of Systematic Theology and Church History at Ormond College
- Sub-discipline: Pioneer of Australian ecumenism
- Institutions: University of Glasgow; Ormond College
- Website: https://universitystory.gla.ac.uk/people/WH10096

David Stow Adam (9 February 1859 – 31 January 1925) was a Scottish minister and professor.

David was born near Langside in Glasgow to George Adam and Jane (née Constable), both schoolteachers. He matriculated to the University of Glasgow in 1874, receiving a Master of Arts degree in 1881 and a Bachelor of Divinity in 1884. He also studied at Erlangen University. Between 1881 and 1884, he taught logic and metaphysics at the University of Glasgow, later teaching Hebrew at Free Church Training College between 1885 and 1886.

In 1886, Adam was ordained a minister of the Free Church of Scotland. In 1907 he was appointed chair of systematic theology and church history at Ormond College, being inducted on 11 March. Following his appointment, the college adopted a more progressive approach. A pioneer in Australian ecumenism, he was elected president of the Council of Churches in Victoria in 1910. He was awarded an honorary Doctor of Divinity degree from the University of Glasgow on 25 June 1912.

In 1916, Adam served as a Chaplain 4th Class of the Hospital Transport Corps in the First Australian Imperial Force. In 1924, he left Australia with his wife in order to see his daughter in China; he also planned to see Christianity in Asia. While in Canton, China, he contracted typhoid fever and pneumonia, dying on 31 January 1925.

== Family ==
Adam married Mary Grace Paterson in 1890; they had one daughter and five sons including Sir Alexander Duncan Grant Adam, a prominent Australian judge who served as a justice of the Supreme Court of Victoria for 17 years, from May 21, 1957, until his retirement on November 29, 1974. Alexander, David's second youngest sonwas created a Knight Bachelor in 1970 for his services to the judiciary.

Mary, wife of David Adam was the sister of Professor John Waugh Paterson prominent Scottish-born agricultural scientist and academic who made significant contributions to agricultural education in Australia. He is most notably recognized as the foundation Hackett Professor of Agriculture at the University of Western Australia (UWA), serving from 1913 to 1934, and as the university's Vice-Chancellor from 1918 to 1921.

Mary and her brother John were 4th cousins of Banjo Paterson who they regularly corresponded with.
