= James Rickard =

Australian Congregationalist minister

James Rickard (c. 1850 – 25 January 1909) was an Australian Congregationalist minister, remembered as the founder of the Council of Churches in the state of Victoria, Australia.

== History ==
Rickard was a son of James Rickard (died 1 February 1887) of Stawell, Victoria.

He studied for the Methodist ministry in the early 1870s and served in the Fingal circuit in Tasmania in 1873, transferred to Toolamba, Victoria in 1875.

He began his Congregational ministry at the Glebe, New South Wales, church in August 1875. Living at the pastorage, St John's Rd Glebe.

He transferred to the Congregational Church of Brighton, Victoria, in 1885.

He was largely responsible for the creation and early success of the Victorian Council of Churches, serving as secretary from its inception to 1906, when he relinquished that position due to illness, and was elected president.

In 1907 he accepted a transfer to the less demanding pastorate of Surrey Hills, and died a few years later.

== Recognition ==
A memorial tablet dedicated to his memory was unveiled at the Brighton Congregational Church in November 1909.

== Family ==
Rickard married twice:

- to Elizabeth Smith (c. 1845 – 11 September 1879) on 4 October 1875.

She gave birth to a son at the Glebe on 15 August 1879; and died a month later.

- to Elizabeth Clark (born c. 1843?) of Hobart on 24 September 1880. They had at least one child:

- Elizabeth Mary Rickard born Glebe 28 July 1881 – 15 February 1926

His eldest daughter Ethel Jane Rickard married Thomas Stephen Hart, MA., lecturer at Ballarat School of Mines, on 14 December 1898, Other daughters were Harriet "Hattie", Irene, Elizabeth, Mabel "Maisie".

James E. Rickard was a son, perhaps the same person as E. Rickard, who was accepted as a probationary student of the Congregational College of Victoria in 1900, and as James E. Rickard was Congregational minister in Queensland.
