= Mark Tronson =

Australian Baptist pastor (1951–2022)

- Born: 5 November 1951
- Died: 4 July 2022 (aged 70)

Mark Vivian Tronson (5 Nov 1951 – 4 July 2022) was an Australian Baptist pastor who established a nationwide sports and leisure ministry known as Specialised Life-Orientated Ministries (SLM), popularly known amongst Australian churches as Sports and Leisure Ministry.

== Education and career ==
Tronson studied theology at Morling Baptist Theological College in Sydney from 1977 to 1980. Following pastorates at Croydon Park and Warragamba (1979–1983), he served as a part-time industrial chaplain until 1992.

In 1984–86 he wrote a doctoral dissertation on sports mission, which earned him a PhD from Louisiana Baptist University in association with Morling College.

From 1978 to 1994 he was The Australian newspaper's hockey writer for Olympics, World Cups and Champions Trophies.

He founded the Sports and Leisure Ministry in 1982 and Well-being Australia in 2000.

== Sports and Leisure Ministry ==
Inspired at an international congress on sports mission in Hong Kong (1982) Tronson pioneered the Sports and Leisure Ministry, in association with the Australian Heads of Churches. The Australian Cricket Board was the first to adopt the idea of a Sports Chaplaincy, appointing Tronson as their chaplain. Over the next 18 years he extended this ministry to many other Australian professional sports associations – involving the placement of 150 chaplains – and developing networks of Christian athletes. He also arranged chaplaincies to Executive Ministries as many board members of sports were in the corporate world, and also to the entertainment, media, and tourism sectors.

Kevan Gosper, the Australian Olympic Committee President, invited Tronson to be a Chaplain at the 1984 Los Angeles Olympics. At subsequent Olympics, Tronson appointed Australian Olympic chaplains. In 2000 Tronson was invited to the IOC Lausanne Switzerland to assist in the development of an Olympic Villages Religious Services protocol.

Tronson has undertaken numerous study tours on sports mission, speaking at seminars and engaging in evangelism in United States, United Kingdom, South Korea, New Zealand, Papua New Guinea, Vanuatu, Israel, Turkey, Italy and France.

Sports Chaplains are well established and since May 2005, SLM has undergone significant changes and is now known as Sports Chaplaincy Australia Inc.

== Well-Being Australia ==
In 2000 due to ill health, the Heads of Churches released Tronson from the Sports and Leisure Ministry, establishing a new venture – "Well-Being Australia". He continued to network with athletes, especially Australian cricketers, and developed athlete respite facilities, Basil Sellers Moruya and Basil Sellers Tweed.

== Recognition ==
In 2005, Tronson was voted as one of Australia's 25 most influential evangelicals by the national evangelical newspaper New Life. Olympian of the Century Carl Lewis presented Mark Tronson and his wife Delma, gold medals in February 2009 in Dallas, Texas, for their 27 years of sports and Olympic ministry.

== Books ==
- Hockey in Australia ISBN 0-9591935-0-2
- World Hockey ISBN 0-9591102-0-8
- Hockey at Large ISBN 0-9590692-0-8
- Hockey Champions ISBN 0-9591102-1-6
- Australia’s World Cup Hockey Win ISBN 0-9591102-2-4
- No Orchestra, No Trumpet ISBN 0-646-20325-8

Tronson also wrote books about his early job working with trains, including Driving Trains the Australian Way and Australian Diesel Locomotive Handbook.
