= J. E. Shipway =

John Edward Shipway (15 October 1885 – 24 August 1960) was a Churches of Christ pastor in Victoria and South Australia.

== History ==
Shipway was a grandson of pioneer (Note: The Shipways of Currency Creek had their origin in Leighterton, Gloucestershire.) John Shipway (c. 1813–1897) and the eldest son of Henry Cornelius ("Harry C.") Shipway (c. 1858–1942) and Margaret A. "Maggie" Shipway, née Goldsworthy (1858–1941) of Myrtle Vale, near Currency Creek, South Australia, and longtime adherents of the Churches of Christ.

He was a graduate of the College of the Bible, Glen Iris, Victoria.

In 1911 he accepted a call by the Churches of Christ to take a position as Evangelist at Stawell, Victoria. He was pastor of Kyneton, Taradale, and Drummond from 1914 to 1916, and for part of that time ran a tent mission to Bamawm, Echuca and Rochester, becoming pastor of Rochester in April 1916, then was called to the church at Port Pirie, South Australia, preaching his first sermon there on 25 November 1916. and in 1920 was elected president of Port Pirie's Council of Churches. In 1921 he was elected president of the Churches of Christ, Northern District Conference.

He left Port Pirie in May 1923 in response to a call from the Swanston Street, Melbourne, Church of Christ. He was elected president of the Conference of Churches of Christ in Victoria for the year 1925–1926, succeeded by A. W. Connor. Towards the end of this term he accepted a call to the church at Carnegie.

In 1928 he was elected president of the Council of Churches in Victoria, an ecumenical organisation.

In 1935 he accepted a call to the Church of Christ, Nailsworth, South Australia. and was replaced by A. H. Hughes.

He succeeded C. M. Verco as president of the Churches of Christ Conference of South Australia for 1940–1941

He died in 1960 and his remains were buried at the Dudley Park cemetery.

== Family ==
Shipway married Ethel Maud Kilpatrick (1890–1965) at Swan Hill, Victoria, on 12 August 1911. They were welcomed in 1914. No record of children has been found.

William H. Shipway of Myrtle Grove was a brother. He married Lorena E. Moore on 8 September 1917. Hilda Myrtle Shipway was a sister. She married Alexander Stuart Grundy on 27 April 1910.
