= Whitley College =

Baptist theological school accredited by the University of Divinity

- Motto: Ad iustitiam
- Motto in English: For justice
- Established: 1891
- Parent institution: University of Divinity
- Affiliations: Baptist Union of Victoria (Australian Baptist Ministries)
- Undergraduates: 150
- Postgraduates: 140
- Location: Melbourne, Victoria, Australia
- Website: whitley.edu.au

Whitley College is a Baptist theological institute in Melbourne, Victoria, Australia. The college is associated with the Baptist Union of Victoria (Australian Baptist Ministries) and is one of the theological schools of the University of Divinity.

== History ==
Whitley College was established in 1891 by the Collins Street Baptist Church as Baptist Theological College of Victoria. William Thomas Whitley was invited to come to Melbourne from England to take up the position of Principal. He remained Principal for the next ten years.

In 1912 the college relocated to Errol Street, North Melbourne, under the leadership of Principal W.H. Holdsworth.

In 1958, Professor Mervyn Himbury was appointed Principal, and under his leadership, plans were developed for a new building to accommodate both the Theological College and a new residential college of the University of Melbourne. The new building, near the university in Royal Parade, Parkville, opened in 1965, and was renamed Whitley College in honour of William Thomas Whitley.

In 1975, Whitley's theological college joined with the Churches of Christ Theological College, now named Stirling Theological College, to establish the Evangelical Theological Association, which was accredited until 2005. Whitley and Stirling are now again separate colleges of the University of Divinity.

The Geoffrey Blackburn Library at Whitley was built in 2001 and contains approximately 30,000 theological books. It also contains the Boreham Collection, which includes books by and about Frank W. Boreham, as well as items from his personal collection.

In 2016, Principal Frank Rees and the College Council announced that Whitley College would cease to be a residential college of the University of Melbourne in December 2017, and continue solely as a theological teaching college of the University of Divinity. The residential building was sold to a commercial student accommodation provider.

The college then appointed Principal, Reverend Professor René Erwich who served until September 2023. Upon Professor Erwich's departure, Whitley's Dean of Research Rev Associate Professor Darrell Jackson stepped into the Interim Principal role, and was subsequently appointed as the next Principal.

Whitley College is currently operating from the St Paschal Precinct at 90 Albion Rd, Box Hill, until renovation works are completed at the Parkville Campus.

== Academics ==
In conjunction with the University of Divinity, prospective students at Whitley College are provided with a variety of degrees and courses for further study. The college offers undergraduate diplomas, undergraduate degrees, as well as graduate certificates, graduate diplomas, master's and doctoral degrees.

=== Accreditation ===
Whitley College is a teaching and research college within the University of Divinity. The University of Divinity was constituted by the University of Divinity Act 1910 (the Melbourne College of Divinity Act 1910), passed by the Parliament of Victoria. The Act, most recently amended in 2016, establishes the University Council and empowers it to confer awards as a higher education provider.

=== Awards and prizes ===
Whitley College awards an annual prize for excellence in writing, named in honour of a notable author and theologian, Frederick Buechner. All students are encouraged to submit pieces and winners of the prize are selected by faculty members.

== Notable alumni ==
- Rowan Downing QC - President United Nations Dispute Tribunal, UN-appointed judge, Khmer Rouge War Crimes Tribunal, Cambodia & Justice, Court of Appeal, Vanuatu
- Matthew Hopcraft - Masterchef contestant
