= Free Church Training College =

The Free Church Training College was an educational institution in Glasgow, Scotland. It was established by the Free Church of Scotland in 1845 as a college for teacher training.

In 1836, David Stow had established a normal school in Glasgow but, following the Disruption of 1843, a legal ruling of 1845 compelled adherents of the Free Church to resign from, what had become, state-funded teaching posts. Stow established a new college in Glasgow as the Free Church Normal Seminary. In 1900, it became the United Free Church Training College when the Free Church merged with the United Presbyterian Church of Scotland. The college came under secular control in 1907, and merged with the Glasgow Church of Scotland Training College to form the Glasgow Provincial Training College, later renamed the Jordanhill College of Education. This in turn became part of the University of Strathclyde in 1993.

== Notable faculty ==
- David Stow Adam, theologian
- John Kerr
