= Noel Vose =

Australian baptist minister

Godfrey Noel Vose (23 December 1921 – 2 May 2016) was a Western Australian Baptist minister, the founding principal of Vose Seminary (formerly the Baptist Theological College of Western Australia) and the only Australian appointed as President of the Baptist World Alliance.

== Biography ==
In 1963, Noel Vose became the Principal and sole staff member of the Baptist Theological College of Western Australia, a position that he held until 1991.

He was appointed President-General of the Baptist Union of Australia in 1975 and served until 1978.

In 1985, he became the first and only Australian appointed as President of the Baptist World Alliance, a role that he served in until 1990. Between 1989 and 1992, Vose led the Baptist World Alliance in theological dialogue with the Mennonite World Conference, marking a renewal of conversations between Baptists and Anabaptists that had ended amicably in approximately 1630.

In 1989, his achievements were recognised when he was made a Member of the Order of Australia.

On 5 June 1990, his wife Heather Vose died unexpectedly during a visit to the United States.

Upon his retirement as principal in 1991 at 70 years old, Vose founded the Parkerville Baptist Church.

In 2008, the Baptist Theological College of Western Australia was renamed Vose Seminary to honour the significant contributions of both Noel Vose, its founding principal, and his wife Heather Vose.

In 2013, Vose published Mena: Daughter of Obedience, a biography about Filumena Weld, based upon the extensive research of his wife, Heather Vose, who died before it could be written. Heather Vose did however provide the title of the biography.

Noel Vose died on 2 May 2016 in Western Australia. He was 94 years old.

== Publications ==
Details of books written by Noel Vose:

Title	Year	ISBN	Notes
Holy Scripture and Holy Spirit	1983	ISBN 0647190184	
Focus on faith : a glimpse of Baptist roots	1986		
If God so loved : studies in John 1	1987	ISBN 0949654272	
"Mena: Daughter of Obedience"	2013	ISBN 9781742584867	No longer in print

== Awards and achievements ==
- 1989 – Member of the Order of Australia (AM)
