= Morling College =

Coordinates: 33.779°S 151.114°E

- Type: Private, Christian
- Established: 1916
- Affiliations: Australian Baptist Ministries
- Principal: Tim MacBride
- Campus: Macquarie Park, New South Wales
- Website: morling.edu.au

Morling College is a Baptist college in Macquarie Park, New South Wales. It is affiliated with the Australian Baptist Ministries. It is an approved teaching institution of the Australian University of Theology, and is a member of the South Pacific Association of Bible Colleges. The principal is Rev Dr Tim MacBride (since July 2023).

== History ==
The college was established in 1916 as Baptist Theological College of New South Wales. It moved to its present location in 1961. It was given its current name in 1985, in honour of the Revd George Henry Morling, who served as principal from 1921 to 1960. In 2021, Vose Seminary became a campus of Morling College, followed by Malyon Theological College in January 2025.

== Notable alumni ==
- Ross Clifford political commentator, author and ex-principal
- Michael Frost, author and missiologist
- Graham Joseph Hill theologian
- Mark Tronson pastor
