= Central Hall, Little Collins Street =

Room and hall in Melbourne, Australia

Coordinates: 37.8143°S 144.9674°E

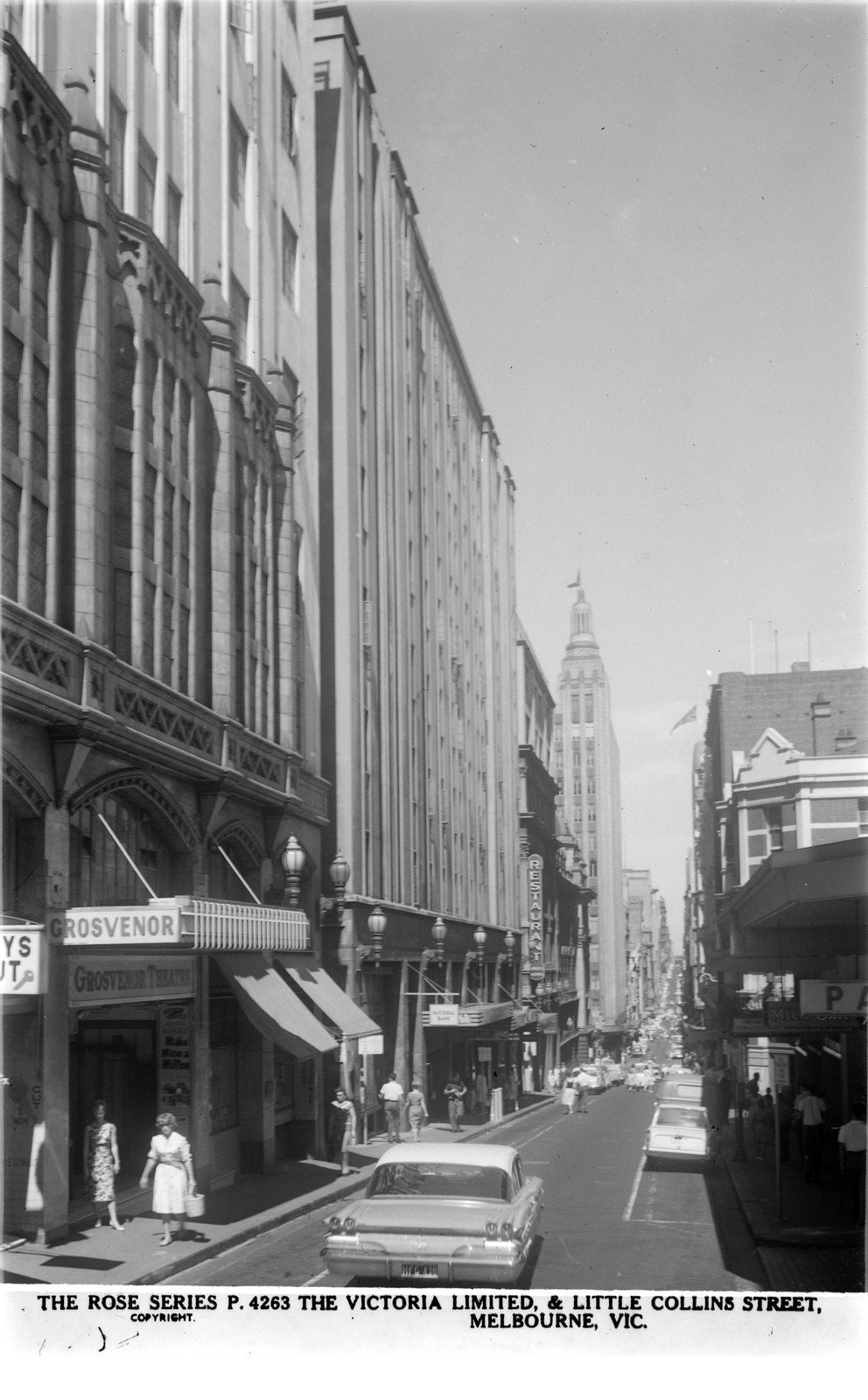
Little Collins Street in the early 1960s showing Grosvenor Theatre entrance to the left.

Central Hall was a meeting room and theatrical hall, and later a cinema known as the Grosvenor Theatre, located at 201 Little Collins Street, in Melbourne, Australia, that operated from 1928 to 1968.

In 1852, the Baptist Church built a meeting hall in Little Collins Street, behind their main church facing Collins Street, located between Swanston and Russell Streets. The first church had been built in 1845, which was replaced with a much grander one in 1862.

In 1927, it was announced that the land occupied by the hall was to be leased to Victoria Palace Ltd. to build a nine-storey building, as a large extension to their hotel next door on Little Collins Street, with 200 bedrooms, designed by architects Gawler & Drummond. The plans included a new hall for the church occupying much of the ground level and a mezzanine, and Victoria Palace contributed £5,000 of the estimated £11,000 required to fit it out as a public hall and recreational facility. Designed to seat 850, it was envisaged that the hall would be used by the church for concerts, meetings, and lectures, and for screening films. The main entrance was on Little Collins Street, but it could also be accessed from Collins Street.

1 Location of Central Hall, Little Collins Street

The new Central Hall was officially opened on 4 October 1928.

In 1929 the church built another eight storey building in the small area remaining to the rear of the church, largely housing facilities for the church, accessed from Collins Street through a corridor to the west of the church, with a small shop attached.

Central Hall was used for a variety of events for just over a decade, and then became a full time cinema in 1942, called the New Central Hall, renamed the Grosvenor Theatre in 1945. The cinema closed in 1968, and the space was gutted for a car park for the Victoria Hotel.

== Events ==
The range of uses for the hall was wide:

- 1929, May : "The New Poor", a play presented by the PLC Old Collegians.
- 1929, June : Francis Birtles' docudrama of Aboriginal life Coorab in the Island of Ghosts, introduced by Eldred Pottinger
- 1929, December : Films King of Kings paired with Albert Brandon-Cremer's Nursery Rhymes
- 1930, May: Old-time minstrels and glee singers' concert, sponsored by radio station 3DB
- 1930, October: Self-improvement lectures by Elsie Lincoln Benedict
- 1931, February : Extra-ordinary general meeting of Hoyts (re-amalgamation with Fox Film Corp.)
- 1931, March: Demonstrations of Physical Culture by Aaron Beattie's pupils
- 1931, June : Professional artists' concerts (patrons: Sir John Grice, Sir William Brunton and Sir John Monash) directed by J. Alexander Browne, baritone
- 1934, September : Noël Coward's Hay Fever, presented by the (amateur) Proscenium Players
- 1937, December : Community singing to celebrate the 104th birthday of Mrs Irene Munro
- 1940, June : Annual meeting of the Country Women's Association
