= Unicode Technical Standard =

Specification in Unicode

A Unicode Technical Standard (UTS) is a specification which has been approved for publication by the Unicode Consortium. It is independent from and does not extend the unicode standard, so conformance to the Unicode Standard does not require conformance with any UTS.
