= Malyon College =

- Former names: Queensland Baptist College; Baptist Theological College of Queensland; Queensland Baptist College of Ministry
- Established: 1904
- Affiliations: Australian Baptist Ministries
- Academic affiliations: Australian College of Theology
- Principal: Tim MacBride
- Location: Brisbane, Australia; 27.4124°S 152.9816°E
- Website: morling.edu.au

Malyon College, now operating as the Morling College – Brisbane Malyon Campus, is a Baptist college located in Brisbane, Queensland. The college is associated with the Queensland Baptists (Australian Baptist Ministries) in Gaythorne, Queensland. It offers degrees through the Australian College of Theology.

== History ==
Malyon College was established in 1904 as the Queensland Baptist College. It became the Baptist Theological College of Queensland (BTCQ) and then the Queensland Baptist College of Ministry (QBCM) before adopting the Malyon College name in honour of its founding principal, T. J. Malyon.

On 1 January 2025, Malyon College merged with Morling College, bringing the two Baptist theological institutions under a single college structure for greater impact and resource sharing. Following the merger, it is officially referred to as the Morling College – Brisbane Malyon Campus.
