= Thomas Jefferson Gore =

Churches of Christ minister

Reverend Thomas Jefferson Gore

Personal life
- Born: 23 March 1839 Bloomfield, Kentucky, United States
- Died: 4 July 1923 (aged 84) Unley, South Australia, Australia
- Resting place: West Terrace Cemetery, Adelaide
- Spouse: Jane Santo (m. 1868; died 1875) Sarah Santo (m. 1876)
- Children: Eleven
- Education: Transylvania University
- Relatives: Philip Santo (father-in-law)

Religious life
- Religion: Christian
- Denomination: Churches of Christ

Thomas Jefferson Gore (23 March 1839 – 4 July 1923) was the first Churches of Christ minister in South Australia. He was born and grew up in Kentucky, United States before emigrating to South Australia in 1866.

== Early life ==
Gore was born in Bloomfield, Kentucky. His parents were Volney Gore and his wife Elizabeth, née Stone. He completed his study at Transylvania University in Lexington, Kentucky in 1863. He worked at the Hustonville Christian Church until he was invited to the Grote Street Church of Christ in Adelaide, South Australia.

== South Australia ==
Gore served the Grote Street Church of Christ from 3 March 1867 until 1885 and again from 1893 to 1898

He had an influence on all of the Churches of Christ in South Australia. The membership was around 500 when he arrived in the colony, and over 7000 by the time of his death. He visited the United States twice during the rest of his life, but remained living in South Australia.

== Personal life ==
Gore married Jane Santo, daughter of Philip Santo on 17 November 1868. They had four children but she died in 1875. He married her younger sister Sarah the next year and they had seven more children. When he died, he was survived by his second wife, three sons and four daughters.
