= Crossway Baptist Church =

Church in Victoria, Australia

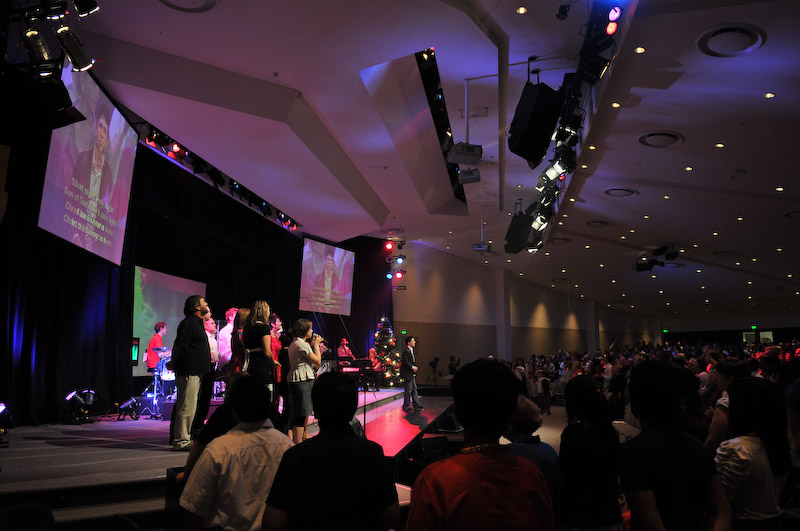
- Crossway Baptist worship service in 2008
- Crossway Baptist Church
- 37°51′33″S 145°10′02″E
- Address: 2 Vision Drive, Burwood East, Melbourne, Victoria
- Country: Australia
- Denomination: Baptist
- Churchmanship: Evangelical
- Website: www.crossway.org.au

History
- Former name: Blackburn Baptist Church (1954 – 1996)
- Status: Church
- Founded: 1954
- Founder: Rev. J. H. Newnham

Architecture
- Architectural type: Church
- Style: Postmodern architecture

Clergy
- Pastor: Dale Stephenson - Senior Pastor

Crossway Baptist Church is a Baptist evangelical multi-site megachurch based in Burwood East, in the eastern suburbs of Melbourne, Victoria, Australia. The church is affiliated with the Australian Baptist Ministries. The organisation's 2024 Annual Report reported a combined average weekly attendance of 22,647.

== History ==
The church was founded by the Reverend J. H. Newnham in 1954 as Blackburn Baptist Church. The congregation originally met in a small hall as a Sunday school class on the corner of Holland and Canterbury Roads in Blackburn South.

The church then relocated to 19 Holland Road, Blackburn South (now the site of New Life Evangelical Church), and later moved in September 1995 to the current location, 2 Vision Drive, Burwood East, after which it changed its name to Crossway Baptist Church the following year. In February 2008, Dale Stephenson became Senior Pastor of the church.

The overall attendance for 2016 was 6,675.

== Locations ==
Crossway has planted churches in Craigieburn, Cranbourne, Moreland and Stonnington as well as a number of other smaller experimental church plants.

They planted a second campus in 2016 in Berwick, in southeastern Melbourne. In 2021, Brighton Baptist Church became the third campus of Crossway.

As of 2023, Crossway had six campuses: Burwood East, South East (located at Nossal High School), Brighton, Maroondah (located at Ringwood Secondary College), Oak City, and Boroondara.

By 2025, the number of attendees at Upwey Baptist Community Church declined over the years, and the church was at risk of closing. In early 2026, Upwey Baptist Community Church became the seventh campus of Crossway and was renamed to Crossway Upwey. The campus was officially launched on the 22 February, along with the 122nd anniversary of the Upwey Baptist Community Church.
