= T. S. B. Woodfull =

Minister in Victoria

Thomas Staines Brittingham Woodfull (1863 – 1 May 1941) was a Methodist minister in Victoria, Australia, who was prominent in the fight against introduction of "the tote" to racetracks. He was the father of the Australian Test cricket captain of the 1930s, Bill Woodfull.

== History ==
Woodfull was born in Maldon, Victoria, and grew up in Prahran, attending the Punt Road Methodist Church. He qualified as a pharmacist, but also acted as lay preacher before being ordained in 1887, with his first placement being Sandhurst (modern-day Bendigo). He was sent as a home missionary to Tasmania, where in 1891 he married Gertrude Lily Abey. In 1893 they moved to Victoria, where he served as minister at Methodist churches at (in turn) Kerang, Maldon, Shepparton, Flemington and Essendon, Collingwood, Bendigo, Albert Park, Brunswick, and Box Hill, where he retired in 1930.

He was President of the Methodist Conference in 1923 and elected president of the Council of Churches in Victoria in 1909.

He died after a long illness in May 1941; his wife died barely a week later. Their last home was at 5 Warida Avenue, East Malvern.

== Other interests ==
Woodfull was a keen cricketer, introducing the game to his sons, all four of whom played senior district cricket in Melbourne. Bill captained Australia during the controversial Bodyline series of 1932–33, when his "physical courage and dignified leadership, when he refused to employ retaliatory tactics, won universal admiration".

== Family ==
Woodfull (1863–1941) married Gertrude Lilian Abey (19 September 1872 – 10 May 1941) in 1891. Their children include

- Balfour Staines Abey "Jack" Woodfull (1892 – 6 July 1963) was born in Deloraine, Tasmania.
- Dora Alice Woodfull (1893–1966) married Grierson
- Melville Bruce Woodfull (1895–1958), born in Kerang, he married Doris Abey, daughter of W. A. Abey, on 26 June 1924. Perhaps a cousin.
- William Maldon "Bill" Woodfull (1897–1965), the famous cricketer, married Gwen King, of Albert Park, on 12 January 1927.
- Vera Faith Woodfull (1902–1959) married S. R. McColl
- (Howard Thomas) Colin Woodfull (10 Mar 1908 – 11 August 1976), born in East Melbourne, solicitor with offices in 52 Queen Street, Melbourne, was appointed secretary of the (later Royal) Victorian Agricultural Society in 1953, married Alva Phillips.

Woodfull's only brother, Alfred Holmes Woodfull (1875–1954), was a Melbourne solicitor and mayor of Prahran.
