= Henry Worrall (minister) =

Australian politician and minister (1862–1940)

Henry Worrall (26 February 1862 – 26 May 1940) was an Australian Methodist minister, Orangeman and temperance advocate. Worrall was born in Hartshead, Lancashire, England and died in Canterbury, Melbourne, Victoria.

== See also ==
- Sir Thomas Bent
- Sir Philip Fysh
- Sir Samuel Gillott
- Sir Frank Madden
- Daniel Mannix
