= Frank W. Boreham =

British preacher

Frank William Boreham OBE (3 March 1871, Tunbridge Wells, Kent, England – 18 May 1959, Melbourne, Victoria) was a Baptist preacher best known in New Zealand, Australia, and England.

== Life and career ==
Boreham's birth coincided with the end of the Franco-Prussian War. He could say in later life, "Salvoes of artillery and peals of bells echoed across Europe on the morning of my birth." He was one of 10 children.

Boreham heard the great American preacher Dwight L. Moody during his youth. On another occasion he was badly injured and spent considerable time in hospital recovering, nursed by a Roman Catholic woman who widened his insight of ecumenism. Boreham became a Baptist preacher after conversion to Christianity while working in London. He was probably the last student interviewed by Charles Spurgeon for entry into his Pastor's College.

After graduation, Boreham accepted a call to be the first minister at the Mosgiel Baptist Church, Dunedin, New Zealand, in March 1895 and there began his prolific writings, initially for the local newspaper. He was joined by his sweetheart Estella ("Stella") Cottee and they were married at Kaiapoi in 1896. They went on to have five children.

In 1906 he moved to Australia to be pastor at the Baptist Tabernacle in Hobart, Tasmania, where he was active in the multi-faith Council of Churches, serving six years as secretary and two as president. In 1916 he left for mainland Australia and churches in the Melbourne suburbs of Armadale and Kew.

He notionally retired in 1928 at age 57, but continued to preach and write, and made extended preaching tours to the USA and Britain in 1928 and again in 1936. In 1928 he was awarded an honorary doctor of divinity by McMaster University in Canada, and was appointed O.B.E. in 1954. During Billy Graham's evangelistic campaign in Australia in early 1959, Graham sought out Boreham for a discussion, due in great part to Boreham's widely read and respected writings.

== Published works ==
Boreham wrote some 3,000 editorials that appeared weekly in the Hobart Mercury for 47 years between 1912 and 1959, and others in the Melbourne Age. He was calling on these works for yet another book, with one article for each day of the year, when he died.

He published some 46 books with Epworth Press, the last The Tide Comes In in 1958, only months before his death. Many of these books received wide international acclaim. Most famous is his series of five books, published between 1920 and 1928, derived from the 125 sermons on the theme "Texts that Made History":

- A Bunch of Everlastings
- A Handful of Stars
- A Casket of Cameos
- A Faggot of Torches
- A Temple of Topaz

=== List ===
- 1891 Won to Glory (with foreword by F.B. Meyer)
- 1902 Loose Leaves (travelogue)
- 1903 From England to Mosgiel (travelogue)
- 1903 The Whisper of God (The Baptist Pulpit series)
- 1911 George Augustus Selwyn (biography)
- 1912 The Luggage of Life
- 1914 Mountains in the Mist
- 1915 The Golden Milestone
- 1915 Mushrooms on the Moor
- 1916 Faces in the Fire
- 1917 The Other Side of the Hill
- 1918 The Silver Shadow
- 1919 The Uttermost Star
- 1920 A Bunch of Everlastings
- 1920 A Reel of Rainbow
- 1921 The Home of the Echoes
- 1922 A Handful of Stars
- 1922 Shadows on the Wall
- 1923 Rubble and Roseleaves
- 1924 A Casket of Cameos
- 1924 Wisps of Wildfire
- 1925 The Crystal Pointers
- 1926 A Faggot of Torches
- 1926 A Tuft of Comet's Hair
- 1927 The Nest of Spears
- 1928 A Temple of Topaz
- 1928 The Fiery Crags
- 1929 The Three Half Moons
- 1930 The Blue Flame
- 1930 An Arch of Roses
- 1931 When the Swans Fly High
- 1932 A Witch's Brewing
- 1933 The bachelors of Mosgiel
- 1933 The Drums of Dawn
- 1934 The Ivory Spires
- 1935 The Heavenly Octave
- 1935 Ships of Pearl
- 1936 The Passing of John Broadbanks
- 1939 I Forgot to Say
- 1940 My Pilgrimage (autobiography)
- 1941 The Prodigal
- 1944 Boulevards of Paradise
- 1945 A Late Lark Singing
- 1948 Cliffs of Opal
- 1948 The Man Who Saved Gandhi (a short biography of J. J. Doke, republished in 2007 as Lover of Life)
- 1950 The Little Palace Beautiful
- 1951 Arrows of Desire
- 1953 My Christmas Book
- 1954 Dreams at Sunset
- 1954 In Pastures Green
- 1955 The Gospel of Robinson Crusoe
- 1956 The Gospel of Uncle Tom's Cabin
- 1958 The Tide Comes In
- 1961 The Last Milestone

Edited compilations:

- Second Thoughts
- The Chalice of Life

In 2016, nearly 50 years after Boreham's death, John Broadbanks Publishing published two volumes of previously unpublished material: Nuggets of Romance and Slices of Infinity. In addition, Pioneer Library and John Broadbanks Publishing are seeking to revive many of his out-of-print books.

The Heritage Collection of the Dunedin Public Libraries includes a Frank W. Boreham Collection of 72 titles, presently housed at the Mosgiel branch library.

== Popular culture ==
Steven James references Boreham several times in Synapse.
