= Stirling Theological College =

Christian college in Mulgrave, Victoria, Australia

Coordinates: 37.928°S 145.195°E

- Former names: Churches of Christ Theological College (CCTC); The College of the Bible
- Motto: Forming God's people for leadership, mission and ministry.
- Type: Christian theological and counselling education
- Established: 1907-2022 (closed)
- Accreditation: none
- Religious affiliation: Churches of Christ
- Academic staff: 0
- Students: 0
- Location: Melbourne, Australia
- Campus: Mulgrave, Victoria, Melbourne CBD, (former)
- Website: stirling.edu.au

Stirling Theological College is a former Australian Christian theological college located in Mulgrave, a south eastern suburb of Melbourne, Victoria.

== History ==
The Bible College, Melbourne was established by the Churches of Christ in 1907 in Carlton, Victoria, by Henry George Harward (died 12 April 1944), with Alexander Russell Main, MA (died 13 October 1945), as lecturer. Main was previously pastor of the Brisbane Church of Christ.

In 1910 the college moved to a new building on a 5 acres (2.0 ha) property in the township of Glen Iris, re-established as the College of the Bible, a wholly owned institution of the Churches of Christ. Its initial intake was around 40 students. Two courses were offered: a three-year Bible course, from which successful students were issued with a Certificate of Proficiency, and a five-year course, entry for which required matriculation, after which successful students would be granted a Degree issued by the University of Melbourne, which body conducted various course modules. By 1912 there were "44 students in residence, including two women students".

The second principal of the college was A. R. Main. He was succeeded around 1938 by one of the lecturers, Thomas Henry Scambler (died 31 October 1944) and in 1945 by E. L. Williams, MA.

It changed its name to Churches of Christ Theological College in 1989 when it moved to 44-60 Jacksons Road, Mulgrave and in September 2011 changed its name to Stirling Theological College in honour of former graduate and vice-principal, Gordon R. Stirling, who ministered in all Australian states and in New Zealand; after retiring he became editor of The Australian Christian.

The college board sold the Mulgrave campus in 2020. In November 2022 the college announced that it was leaving the University of Divinity on December 31, 2022. It subsequently announced merger discussions with the Australian College of Ministries which is a Member Institute of Sydney College of Divinity. The substantial proceeds from the sale of the Mulgrave property are administered by the Stirling Theological College Trust, details of which can be located on the ACNC website.

== Notable alumni ==
- Ernest Aderman OBE (1894–1968) - Member of Parliament in New Zealand
- Andrew Hughes - missionary, minister, politician, actor
- Terry Lane - noted atheist, radio broadcaster and newspaper columnist
- Gordon Moyes AC - Head of Wesley Mission in Sydney and Member of Parliament in New South Wales

== Principals ==
Three presidents of the council of the University of Divinity and its predecessors, the Melbourne College of Divinity and MCD University of Divinity, came from Stirling Theological College: K. R. Bowes (1978–79), W. Tabbernee (1986-1987) and M. A. Kitchen (2004-05). A. F. Menzies served as Deputy Chancellor of the University of Divinity from 2012 to 2020.

- 1907 - 1910: H. G. Harward
- 1910 - 1938: A. R. Main
- 1938 - 1944: T. H. Scambler
- 1944 - 1973: E. L. Williams
- 1974 - 1980: K. R. Bowes
- 1981 - 1990: W. Tabbernee
- 1993 - 1999: G. O. Elsdon
- 2000 - 2009: M. A. Kitchen OAM
- 2010 - 2020: A. F. Menzies
- 2020 - 2022: G. J. Hill
- 2022 - : S. Sutton (Final Interim Principal)
