= Australian Baptist Ministries =

Christian denomination

- Classification: Evangelicalism
- Theology: Baptist
- National Chair: Rev John Robertson
- National Ministries Director: Rev Mark Wilson
- Associations: Baptist World Alliance
- Origin: 1926
- Congregations: 1,041
- Members: 79,326
- Missionary organization: Baptist Mission Australia
- Aid organization: Baptist World Aid Australia
- Seminaries: 3
- Official website: baptist.org.au

Australian Baptist Ministries (formerly Australian Baptist Union, then Baptist Union of Australia) is a Baptist Christian denomination in Australia. The Baptist Union of Australia was inaugurated on 24 August 1926 at the Burton Street Church in Sydney. The headquarters is in Belmont. It is affiliated with the Baptist World Alliance.

== History ==
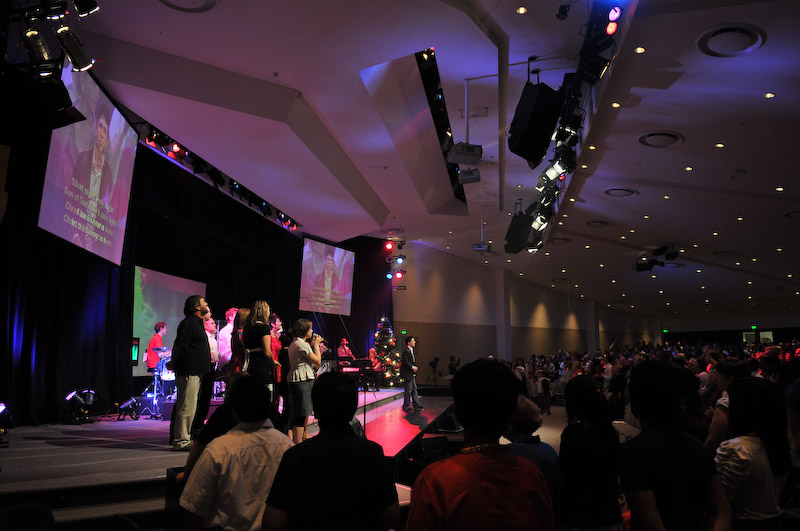
Worship service at Crossway Baptist Church in Melbourne, affiliated with Australian Baptist Ministries, 2008

Baptist work in Australia began in Sydney in 1831, forty-three years after the British penal colony was established. The first preacher was John McKaeg, who conducted the first Baptist service on Sunday 24 April in The Rose and Crown Inn on the corner of Castlereagh and King Streets. The first baptism, of two female congregants, was conducted by McKaeg in Woolloomooloo Bay on 12 August 1832.

It was not until 1835 that the first church was established in Hobart Town by Henry Dowling, a strict Calvinist. John Saunders, who had been sent by the Baptist Missionary Society of England to Sydney in 1834, raised the funding to erect a second church which was opened on 23 September 1836. The first state Union was formed in Victoria in 1862. The national Baptist Union was founded in 1926 by representatives from existing state unions. In 1978, Marita Munro became the first woman ordained pastor within the body. In 2009 it was renamed Australian Baptist Ministries.

According to a census published by the association in 2025, it has 1,041 churches and 79,326 members.

== Beliefs ==
=== Marriage ===
In 2022, the New South Wales and Australian Capital Territory Baptist Association voted to require adherence to a creed affirming marriage only between a man and a woman. In 2023, Union churches that support same-sex marriage founded the Open Baptists Association.

== Ministries ==
=== Unions ===
- Baptist Churches Western Australia
- Baptist Union of Victoria
- Tasmanian Baptists
- Baptist Churches SA & NT
- Queensland Baptists
- Baptist Association NSW & ACT

=== National affiliated ministries ===
- Baptist Care Australia
- Baptist Mission Australia
- Baptist World Aid Australia
- Crossover
- Baptist Insurance Services
- Baptist Financial Services

== Affiliations ==
Australian Baptist Ministries is a member of the Asia Pacific Baptist Federation (formerly Asian Baptist Federation) and the Baptist World Alliance. Ministry arms of ABM include Baptist Mission Australia (formerly known as the Australian Baptist Missionary Society and then as Global Interaction), Australian Baptist World Aid, Baptist Care, and a number of Delegated Bodies which represent communities of practice, developing strategies and resources that benefit the Australian Baptist movement. These include: Crossover Australia, and Crossover Remote (formerly Northreach). The national work is divided among one territory and six state unions, which operate independently, with the national body functioning as a governance council to facilitate collaborative ministries and mission initiatives across the Baptist movement in Australia.

== Theological colleges ==
There are four theological colleges affiliated with state Baptist associations, three of them having amalgamated into one. The Victorian College is Whitley College. Morling College began as the NSW & ACT college but also now incorporates Malyon College of Queensland and Vose Seminary of Perth.

== Other bibliography ==
- From Woolloomooloo to 'Eternity': A History of Australian Baptists by Ken R. Manley (Paternoster, 2006, 2 volumes, ISBN 1-84227-194-6 & ISBN 1-84227-405-8)
- Baptists Around the World, by Albert W. Wardin, Jr.
