= South Pacific Association of Evangelical Colleges =

The South Pacific Association of Evangelical Colleges (SPAEC) (previously the South Pacific Association of Bible Colleges (SPABC)) was an association of independent evangelical Bible colleges that operated from 1969 until the end of 2018. Colleges were located in Australia, Papua New Guinea, Vanuatu and New Zealand.

== Members ==
Member colleges included:

- Adelaide College of Ministries
- Alliance College of Australia (formerly Canberra College of Theology)
- Bible College of South Australia (formerly Adelaide Bible Institute)
- Bible College of Western Australia (formerly West Australian Bible College)
- Booth College (NSW) (formerly The Salvation Army College of Further Education)
- Brisbane School of Theology (formerly Crossway College, Bible College of Queensland and Queensland Bible Institute)
- Capernwray Torchbearers Australia
- Carey Baptist College
- Christian Leaders Training College
- Dunamis International College of Ministries
- Emmaus Bible College
- Harvest Bible College
- Kingsley College
- Laidlaw College (formerly Bible College of New Zealand)
- Malyon College - Queensland Baptist College of Ministries
- Melbourne School of Theology (formerly Bible College of Victoria)
- Morling College (offers distance education)
- Nazarene Theological College
- New Covenant International Bible College
- Pathways College of Bible and Mission
- Perth Bible College
- Reformed Theological College
- Sydney Missionary and Bible College
- Tabor College Victoria
- Tabor College Perth
- Tahlee Bible College
- Talua Ministry Training Centre
- World View Centre for Intercultural Studies
