= Tabor (Australia) =

Australian Christian college

Coordinates: 34°58′15.93″S 138°33′31.14″E

Tabor College, Australia
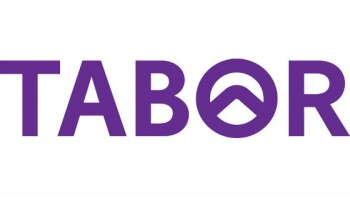
- Motto: "Witnesses of His Majesty" (2 Peter 1:16)
- Type: Christian tertiary education
- Established: 6 February 1979
- President: Dr Johan Roux
- Students: 1,400
- Location: Adelaide and Perth, Australia
- Campus: Millswood, South Australia
- Website: tabor.edu.au

Tabor College is an Australian Christian tertiary college offering a range of liberal arts courses from certificate to post-graduate studies in the areas of counselling, education, ministry, performing arts, mission, youth studies and humanities. The college is based in Adelaide, South Australia with a campus in Perth, Western Australia. The Adelaide campus, formerly including the national headquarters, is housed in heritage listed buildings in Millswood, which were formerly the Goodwood Orphanage and more recently an education centre. The Tabor Institute of Music (TIM) established in 2022 provides short courses, professional development and specialist music facilities.

== History ==
Tabor had its origins in the then Christian Revival Crusade (now CRC Churches International), a Pentecostal denomination. It has retained its charismatic ethos and established itself as a liberal arts institution with many students and faculty coming from mainline churches. These include the Anglican, Baptist, Churches of Christ, Uniting Church in Australia churches, as well as many Pentecostal groups. Tabor seeks to ensure all its programmes are: Scripture-based, Christ-centred, academically sound, ministry-oriented, positively expressed and spiritually empowered.

Tabor's founding principal was Pastor Barry Chant, now retired from the role of pastor of the International Congregation at Wesley Mission in Sydney. Chant is the author of several books including a history of Pentecostalism in Australia called Heart of Fire (1984, Adelaide: Tabor). Chant started the college in Adelaide with co-founder Dennis Slape.

The name and logo of the college refers to Mount Tabor, Israel which, according to Christian tradition, was the site of the Transfiguration of Christ described in the gospels and Second Epistle of Peter.

=== Expansion and partnerships ===
The college expanded with new campuses in Melbourne in 1988 and Sydney and Perth in 1992. Kingsley College merged its higher education courses with Tabor Victoria in January 2008.

=== Successor colleges ===
- New South Wales and Queensland: Australian College of Christian Studies (ACCS), established 2014
- Victoria: Eastern College Australia established 2015.
- Tasmania: Alphacrucis from 2016 incorporated Tabor Tasmania
- South Australia and Western Australia: Tabor College main campus in Adelaide, the previously independent Tabor Perth merged with Tabor Adelaide in 2015 maintaining a Perth campus

== Admission ==
The admission process for undergraduates is based on the Australian Tertiary Admission Rank and interviews held between the applicants and faculty.

== Awards ==
Tabor College offers undergraduate Bachelor of Music, Bachelor of Theology, Bachelor of Ministry and Bachelor of Intercultural Studies degrees, as well as Bachelor of Arts degrees in humanities, Bachelor of Social Science degrees in Counselling or Youthwork, and a variety of Bachelor of Education degrees. Tabor also offers master's degrees in all its faculties as well as a PhD in theology.

== Associations ==
Tabor has formal links with a range of allied organisations including the South Pacific Association of Bible Colleges, the Association of Pentecostal and Charismatic Bible Colleges of Australasia, the Australian and New Zealand Theological Library Association, Unilinc and Missions Interlink.

== See also ==
- Christian education (disambiguation)
