= Shane Clifton =

Australian theologian

Shane Clifton is an Australian theologian and disability scholar.

Clifton was the Dean of Theology at Alphacrucis College (Sydney, New South Wales, Australia, resigning in 2019.). He received his PhD from the Australian Catholic University. In 2024 Clifton was appointed Associate Professor in the Sydney School of Health Sciences at the University of Sydney. Since 2025 Clifton has been Director of the Centre for Disability Research and Policy at the University of Sydney. In addition to his role with Alphacrucis, Clifton was previously the editor of the Australasian Pentecostal Studies journal. His 2005 dissertation and subsequent book (published 2009) was entitled Pentecostal Churches in Transition. He has co-written Globalization and the Mission of the Church with ACU's Professor Neil Ormerod. After a serious accident, in October 2010, that left him a quadriplegic, Shane has focused his scholarly work on exploring the intersection between disability and various conceptions of the good life.
