= Emmaus Bible College (Australia) =

Bible college from 1954 to 2017

Coordinates: 33°46′06.25″S 151°04′06.25″E

Emmaus Bible College was an Australian bible college established in 1954 last located in Macquarie Park, a suburb of Sydney. It was associated with the Christian Community Churches of Australia (Open Brethren). It was affiliated with the South Pacific Association of Evangelical Colleges and the Sydney College of Divinity. In late 2017 it amalgamated with the Australian College of Christian Studies (formerly known as Tabor College NSW).

It offered courses on site and by distance education, with courses accessed from 105 countries and in 125 languages. Emmaus Bible College was a sister institution to the founding Emmaus Bible College, opened in 1941 in Toronto, Canada.

The college had about 30 full and part-time students. Sixty percent of the student body were Brethren. Its library held the largest collection of Brethren books in the southern hemisphere.
