= Bible colleges affiliated with Australian Christian Churches =

Bible colleges affiliated with Australian Christian Churches refers to Bible colleges that are registered with Australian Christian Churches, a Pentecostal denomination. Australian Christian Churches currently has eight registered Bible colleges, that train aspiring ACC pastors, leaders, evangelists and missionaries as well as people from other denominations and other aspirations. Alphacrucis is the official ministry training college of the denomination.

== Official colleges ==
=== Alphacrucis ===
In 1948, Commonwealth Bible College was established as the official ministry training college of Australian Christian Churches. The college moved from Melbourne to Brisbane, then to Katoomba. In 1993, under a new incorporation, the college became Southern Cross College of the Assemblies of God in Australia, simply known as Southern Cross College. In 1996, the College moved to Chester Hill in Sydney. In 2009, the college adopted a new name Alphacrucis launched at the ACC National Conference. Alphacrucis and Harvest Bible College merged in 2018, established in 1985, Harvest had campuses at Scoresby Victoria; Perth; Brisbane and on the Gold Coast; and in Denmark and the United Kingdom

=== Hillsong International Leadership College ===
Hillsong International Leadership College, established in 1988, has its campus at Baulkham Hills, New South Wales. The college relies on its courses being accredited by Alphacrusis. When Hillsong became its own denomination, it is no longer a college of Australian Christian Churches.

=== Other colleges ===
- ICI College Australia, at Legana a suburb of Launceston, Tasmania
- Influencers School (previously Paradise College of Ministries), operated by Influencers Church in Paradise, South Australia
- Southland Training Australia

== Relationship between ordination and academics in the ACC ==
Mainline church denominations generally require their pastors to have graduated from one of their own denominational theological colleges in order to be ordained. This is not the case in the ACC. Pastors and leaders can be ordained as long as they meet certain conditions set by the ACC, yet the academic conditions do not require that candidates have studied at Alphacrucis or any other registered ACC college. At one level this allows for an autonomy at a local church level which is unheard of in mainline churches. However, it also has called into question how there can even be a true and official ministry training college for the ACC.

Mainline churches generally require a bachelor's degree in either ministry or theology plus units which cover the denominational distinctives. This usually equates to about five years full-time higher educational study. Again, at the ACC this is not the case. In fact the minimum academic requirement by the ACC is that candidates "have undertaken a recognised Bible study course and/or given evidence to the interviewing committee that he/she is equipped by private reading and study to fulfill the relevant ministry." This generally equates to a Certificate IV in Ministry. This is in line with ACC's understanding of priority of the empowerment of the Holy Spirit over and above academic training and allows a lot of autonomy at a local church level. But again, it has called into question how there really can be any official training colleges for the ACC, as whether someone has studied there or even done any formal study at all is unnecessary for ordination.
