= List of acts of the Parliament of Victoria from 1902 =

This is a list of acts of the Parliament of Victoria, Australia for the year 1902.

== 1902 ==
Short title, or popular name	Citation	Royal assent
Long title
Trust Funds Act 1902	2 Edw. VII. No. 1782	24 June 1902
An Act to amend the Trust Funds Act 1897. (Note: Trust Funds Act 1897 (61 Vict. No. 1531))
	2 Edw. VII. No. 1783	24 June 1902
An Act to apply out of the Consolidated Revenue the sum of Six hundred and four thousand and eighty-five pounds to the service of the year One thousand nine hundred and two and One thousand nine hundred and three.
Bodies Corporate (Joint Tenancy) Act 1902	2 Edw. VII. No. 1784	8 August 1902
An Act for enabling Bodies Corporate to hold Property in Joint Tenancy. (Repealed by Conveyancing Act 1915 (6 Geo. V. No. 2633))
Instruments Act 1902 (repealed)	2 Edw. VII. No. 1785	8 August 1902
An Act to further amend the Instruments Act 1890. (Note: Instruments Act 1890 (54 Vict. No. 1103)) (Repealed by Instruments Act 1915 (6 Geo. V. No. 2672))
	2 Edw. VII. No. 1786	8 August 1902
An Act to apply out of the Consolidated Revenue the sum of Two hundred and forty-seven thousand three hundred and eighty-six pounds to the service of the year One thousand nine hundred and one and One thousand nine hundred and two.
	2 Edw. VII. No. 1787	8 August 1902
An Act to apply out of the Consolidated Revenue the sum of Seven hundred and sixty thousand four hundred and seventy-seven pounds to the service of the year One thousand nine hundred and two and One thousand nine hundred and three.
Footscray Deposit Receipts Act 1902	2 Edw. VII. No. 1788	19 August 1902
An Act to enable the City of Footscray to obtain Advances on the Security of Certain Deposit Receipts.
Acting Victorian Railways Commissioner Act 1902	2 Edw. VII. No. 1789	19 August 1902
An Act to provide for the further Appointment of an Acting Victorian Railways Commissioner.
	2 Edw. VII. No. 1790	24 October 1902
An Act to apply out of the Consolidated Revenue the sum of Six hundred and seventy-seven thousand seven hundred and seventy-one pounds to the service of the year One thousand nine hundred and two and One thousand nine hundred and three.
	2 Edw. VII. No. 1791	
Mallee Land Account Act 1902	2 Edw. VII. No. 1792	12 November 1902
An Act relating to the Mallee Land Account.
Members and Public Service Retrenchment Act 1902	2 Edw. VII. No. 1793	12 November 1902
An Act to provide for the Reduction until the thirtieth day of June One thousand nine hundred and three of the Reimbursement of Expenses payable to Members of the Legislative Assembly and the Salaries or Pay of certain Public Officers.
Trading Stamps Act 1902 (repealed)	2 Edw. VII. No. 1794	12 November 1902
An Act to amend the Trading Stamps Act 1901. (Note: Trading Stamps Act 1901 (1 Edw. VII. No. 1750)) (Repealed by Goods Act 1915 (6 Geo. V. No. 2663))
Treasury Bonds Act 1902	2 Edw. VII. No. 1795	25 November 1902
An Act to authorize the issue of Treasury Bonds.
Victorian Loans Redemption Fund Act 1902 (repealed)	2 Edw. VII. No. 1796	25 November 1902
An Act to further amend the Victorian Loans Redemption Fund Act 1898. (Note: Victorian Loans Redemption Fund Act 1898 (62 Vict. No. 1565)) (Repealed by Statute Law Revision Act 1995 (No. 11 of 1995))
Trust Funds Act 1902 (No. 2)	2 Edw. VII. No. 1797	25 November 1902
An Act to further amend the Trust Funds Act 1897.
Police Regulation Act 1902 (repealed)	2 Edw. VII. No. 1798	25 November 1902
An Act to amend Part III. of the Police Regulation Act 1890 (Note: Police Regulation Act 1890 (54 Vict. No. 1127)) with regard to future Appointees. (Repealed by Police Regulation Act 1915 (6 Geo. V. No. 2709))
Methodist Union Act 1902	2 Edw. VII. No. 1799	25 November 1902
An Act to confirm the Union in Victoria of the Wesleyan Methodist Church, the Primitive Methodist Church, the Bible Christian Church, and The United Methodist Free Churches; to deal with the Properties in Victoria of the said Uniting Churches, and to assimilate the Trusts thereof; to vest the said Properties in the United Church under the name of the Methodist Church of Australasia; to give certain powers to the Victoria and Tasmania Conference of the Methodist Church of Australasia; to amend The Victorian Wesleyan Methodists' Act 1887, (Note: Victorian Wesleyan Methodists' Act 1887 (51 Vict. No. 931)) and for other purposes.
Treasury Bonds Act 1902 (No. 2)	2 Edw. VII. No. 1800	25 November 1902
An Act to authorize the issue of Treasury Bonds (No. 2).
Cancelled Debentures Act 1902	2 Edw. VII. No. 1801	25 November 1902
An Act to authorize the Destruction of Discharged Public Debentures Bonds and Coupons.
Defences Act 1902	2 Edw. VII. No. 1802	25 November 1902
An Act to further amend the Defences and Discipline Act 1890. (Note: Defences and Discipline Act 1890 (54 Vict. No. 1083))
Government Buildings Rent Act 1902 (repealed)	2 Edw. VII. No. 1803	25 November 1902
An Act relating to charging Public Officers for Rent of Public Buildings used by them for Residence. (Repealed by Public Service Act 1915 (6 Geo. V. No. 2713))
Factories and Shops Continuance Act 1902 (repealed)	2 Edw. VII. No. 1804	5 December 1902
An Act to revive and continue the Factories and Shops Act 1896 (Note: Factories and Shops Act 1896 (60 Vict. No. 1445)) and the Acts amending the same in respect of certain trades and businesses and to make special provision in respect of certain other trades and businesses. (Repealed by Factories and Shops Act 1905 (5 Edw. VII. No. 1975))
Railway Loan Application Act 1902	2 Edw. VII. No. 1805	9 December 1902
An Act to sanction the issue and application of certain sums of Money available under Loan Acts for Railways.
Public Works Loan Application Act 1902	2 Edw. VII. No. 1806	9 December 1902
An Act to sanction the issue and application of certain Sums of Money available under Loan Acts for Public Works and other purposes.
Railway Loan Rates Abolition Act 1902	2 Edw. VII. No. 1807	9 December 1902
An Act to provide for the abolition of Local Rates on certain lines of railway.
Long Lake Water Supply Act 1902	2 Edw. VII. No. 1808	9 December 1902
An Act to provide by pumping for the Supply of Water from Long Lake to Part of the Eastern Mallee.
Marriage Act 1902 (repealed)	2 Edw. VII. No. 1809	9 December 1902
An Act to amend the Marriage Act 1900. (Note: Marriage Act 1900 (64 Vict. No. 1684)) (Repealed by Marriage Act 1915 (6 Geo. V. No. 2691))
Statistics Collection Act 1902	2 Edw. VII. No. 1810	9 December 1902
An Act to provide for the Collection of Statistics.
Municipal Overdrafts (Indemnity) Act 1902	2 Edw. VII. No. 1811	9 December 1902
An Act to indemnify the Councillors of various Municipalities for Borrowing Moneys by Overdrafts on Bankers for the purposes of their Municipalities contrary to the provisions of the Local Government Act 1890 (Note: Local Government Act 1890 (54 Vict. No. 1112)) and for other purposes.
Water Supply Loans Application Act 1902	2 Edw. VII. No. 1812	9 December 1902
An Act to sanction the issue and application of certain sums of money available under Loan Acts for Water Supply in Country Districts and for other purposes.
	2 Edw. VII. No. 1813	22 December 1902
An Act to apply out of the Consolidated Revenue the sum of Seven hundred and seventy-one thousand five hundred and ninety-one pounds to the service of the year One thousand nine hundred and two and One thousand nine hundred and three.

== Sources ==
- "1902 Victorian Historical Acts". AustLII.
