= Council for Christian Colleges and Universities =

Higher education association

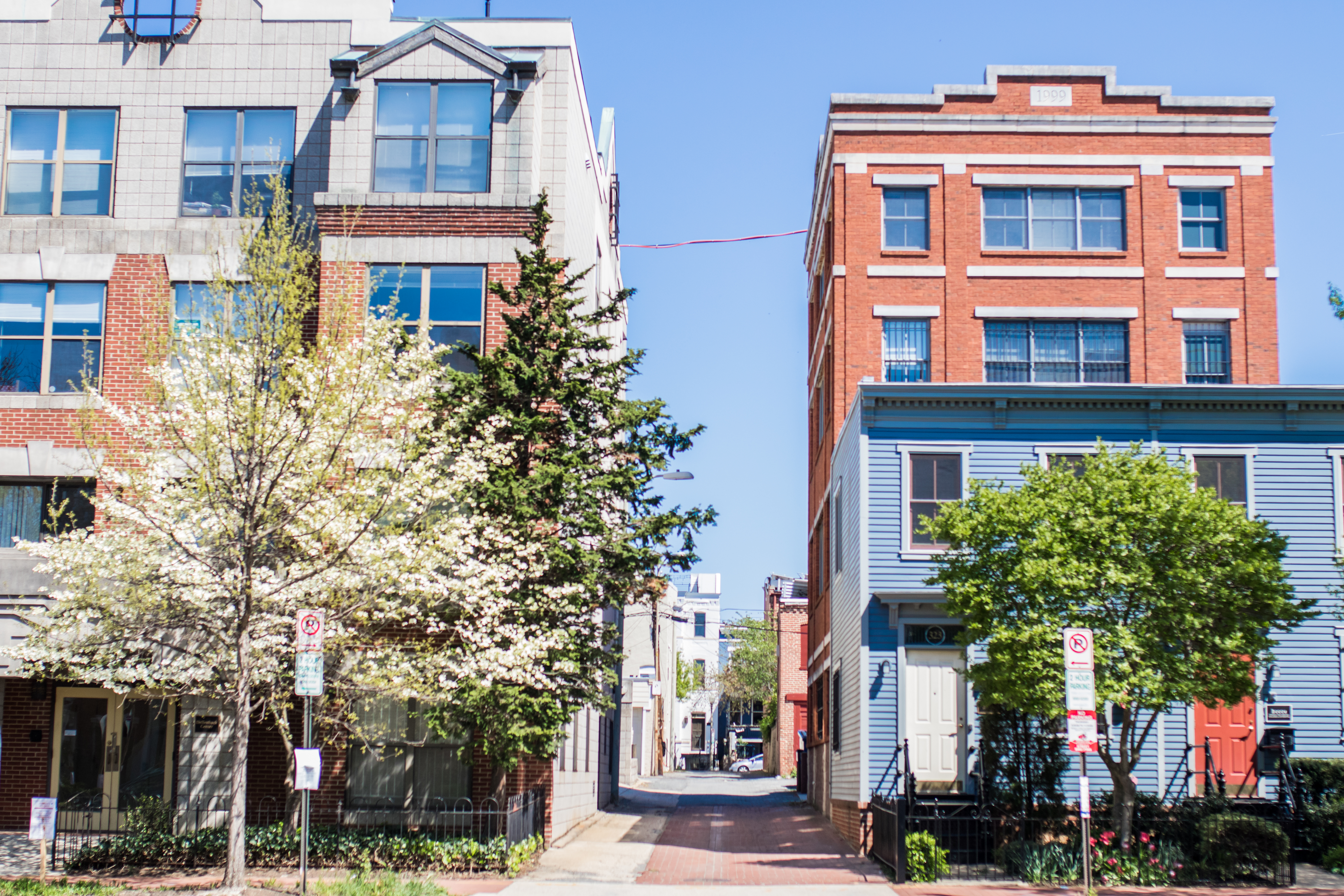
- The Council for Christian Colleges and Universities headquarters in Capitol Hill, Washington, D.C.
- Abbreviation: CCCU
- Formation: 1976; 50 years ago
- Type: Non-governmental organization
- Headquarters: 20 M Street SE, Suite 350
- Location: Washington, D.C., United States
- Region served: 20 countries
- Members: 170
- Website: cccu.org

Council for Christian Colleges & Universities (CCCU) is an international organization of evangelical Christian colleges and universities. The headquarters is in Washington, D.C., United States.

== History ==
In 1976, presidents of colleges in Christian College Consortium called a meeting in Washington, D.C. to organize a Coalition for Christian Colleges that could expand the objectives of the consortium. Representatives from 38 colleges participated in the founding meeting to establish a new organization to provide a unified voice representing the interests and concerns of Christian colleges to government decision-makers and the general public.

The Coalition and the Consortium shared facilities in Washington, D.C. until 1982, when the Consortium relocated to St. Paul, Minnesota and the Coalition formally incorporated as an independent organization. In 1995, the organization changed its name to the Coalition for Christian Colleges and Universities; in 1999 it changed again to the Council for Christian Colleges and Universities. In 2025, CCCU had 170 members in 20 countries.

== Leadership ==
In September 2014, Shirley V. Hoogstra was named the council's seventh president. Before that, she was the vice president for student life at Calvin University in Grand Rapids, Michigan, after having served for four years on Calvin's board of trustees. While at Calvin, Hoogstra also served as a cabinet member who became familiar with team building, campus-wide planning and communications. She was also the co-host of Inner Compass, a nationally televised show on PBS. She has served in a variety of volunteer leadership roles for CCCU institutes and commissions, and is the council's first female president. The previous president, Edward O. Blews Jr., served from January 1, 2013, to October 22, 2013. William P. Robinson, former president of Whitworth University, was named the interim president before Hoogstra was appointed.

The council has a 17-member board of directors, most of whom are presidents of member institutions. The chair is Dan Boone, president of Trevecca Nazarene University.

== Programs ==
=== Advocacy ===
CCCU seeks to provide a unified voice for faith-based institutions of higher learning on policy matters that affect its constituency and to equip members to engage in effective advocacy on the state and local level. The advocacy agenda includes concerns about religious liberty, institutional autonomy, student financial aid, immigration, environmental stewardship, prison education, and government regulation affecting higher education.

=== Services ===
CCCU provides programs and services for presidents and administrators, trustees, faculty, and students of member institutions. These include many professional development opportunities, such as annual gatherings for its college and university presidents, and annual conferences for member Chief Institutional Development Officers; Communication, Marketing and Media Officers; Chief Enrollment Officers; Chief Financial Officers; Campus Ministry Directions, and other leadership development programs. Other member services include webinars, grant-making opportunities for scholarship and research, discipline specific forums, networking communities, a tuition waver exchange program, and an online career center. Members also receive access to the council's biannual magazine called CCCU ADVANCE, as well as regular news updates, website resources on scholarship, and information related to Christian higher education policy and issues. In 2019 the council launched an online consortium to allow participating schools to share online courses.

=== CCCU GlobalEd ===
The CCCU administers a number of student off-campus study programs around the world through CCCU GlobalEd (formerly known as BestSemester). Its first off-campus program, the American Studies Program, was established in Washington, D.C., in the 1970s. It added a contemporary music program in Nashville and a film studies program in Los Angeles, as well as international study abroad programs in Australia, Latin America, the Middle East, Northern Ireland, Oxford, England, and Uganda. Over 14,500 students and growing have benefitted from these academically rigorous, Christ-centered, experiential education programs for almost 50 years. The Australian and Latin American programs ceased operation in 2020. The Nashville, Los Angeles, Uganda, and Northern Ireland programs have all been acquired by CCCU member institutions. A program in Russia (Russian Studies Program) operated from 1994 to 2010. A program in China (China Studies Program) operated from 1999 to 2016 . A program in India (India Studies Program) operated from 2011 to 2015.

== Membership ==
CCCU institutions are accredited, comprehensive colleges and universities whose missions are Christ-centered and rooted in the historic Christian faith. Most also have curricula rooted in the arts and sciences. Member institutions are divided into four major categories depending on type of institution, agreement the council's defining commitments, and geographical location.

In 2016, the organization adopted a membership policy that contains a clause affirming its commitment to heterosexual Christian marriage. The policy defined six criteria according to which affiliated schools would be designated as governing members, associate members, or collaborative partners. Schools located outside of the United States or Canada are classified as International Affiliates.

=== Withdrawals from membership ===
In August 2015, Union University and Oklahoma Wesleyan University withdrew from membership in the CCCU because of a policy change by two member institutions to hire same-sex couples. A potential split within the CCCU was avoided with the announcement on September 21, 2015, that both Goshen College and Eastern Mennonite University, the two colleges that changed their policies to hire same-sex couples, had withdrawn from the council. The council issued a statement affirming the traditional Christian view of marriage as between a man and a woman. A task force was appointed to examine the rationale for the existing associational categories plus address how to remain rooted in traditional Christianity, leading to the announcement of a new membership policy in 2016. Bluffton University also withdrew its membership in the council in December 2015 when it announced a policy change to allow hiring gay and lesbian employees.

On November 3, 2015, The Master's College announced their withdrawal from the CCCU due to the college's "concerns about the direction of the CCCU" on issues such as Creation and Evolution and same-sex marriage, stating that "the vast majority of [CCCU] member schools do not accept the Genesis account of creation or the inerrancy of Scripture". Cedarville University and Shorter University also withdrew from the council over concerns that the council's rejection of same-sex marriage was not swift or complete enough.

== Governing member institutions ==
Governing (voting) members must fulfill all six criteria:

- Christian mission
- Institutional type and accreditation (must offer a "comprehensive undergraduate curricula rooted in the arts and sciences")
- Cooperation and participation (dues)
- Institutional integrity (financial ethics)
- Employment policies (full-time faculty and administrators must be professing Christians), and
- Christian distinctions and advocacy (must support the advocacy agenda determined by the Board of Directors, including a sexual ethic committed to heterosexual marriage, care for the marginalized and suffering, and environmental stewardship).

Institution name	Location	Denominational affiliation	Year joined
Abilene Christian University	Abilene, Texas	Churches of Christ	1982
Ambrose University	Calgary, Alberta	Christian and Missionary Alliance	2007
Anderson University	Anderson, Indiana	Church of God (Anderson)	1982
Anderson University	Anderson, South Carolina	South Carolina Baptist Convention	2011
Asbury University	Wilmore, Kentucky	Nondenominational	1976
Azusa Pacific University	Azusa, California	Nondenominational	1976
Belhaven University	Jackson, Mississippi	Presbyterian Church (USA)	1979
Bethany Lutheran College	Mankato, Minnesota	Evangelical Lutheran Synod	2017
Bethel University	Mishawaka, Indiana	Missionary Church	1984
Bethel University	Arden Hills, Minnesota	Baptist General Conference	1976
Biola University	La Mirada, California	Inter-denominational	1976
Bluefield University	Bluefield, Virginia	Baptist General Association of Virginia	2008
Bushnell University	Eugene, Oregon	Christian churches and churches of Christ and Christian Church (Disciples of Christ)	1981
California Baptist University	Riverside, California	Southern Baptist Convention	1990
Calvin University	Grand Rapids, Michigan	Christian Reformed Church	1981
Campbellsville University	Campbellsville, Kentucky	Southern Baptist Convention	1976
Central Christian College of Kansas	McPherson, Kansas	Free Methodist Church	2001
Charleston Southern University	North Charleston, South Carolina	South Carolina Baptist Convention	2003
College of the Ozarks	Point Lookout, Missouri	Nondenominational	1996
Colorado Christian University	Lakewood, Colorado	Inter-denominational	1985
Columbia International University	Columbia, South Carolina	Nondenominational	2000
Concordia University Ann Arbor	Ann Arbor, Michigan	Lutheran Church–Missouri Synod	2019
Concordia University Chicago	River Forest, Illiniois	Lutheran Church–Missouri Synod	2021
Concordia University Irvine	Irvine, California	Lutheran Church–Missouri Synod	2011
Concordia University Nebraska	Sweard, Nebraska	Lutheran Church–Missouri Synod	
Concordia University Wisconsin	Mequon, Wisconsin	Lutheran Church–Missouri Synod	2019
Corban University	Salem, Oregon	Nondenominational	1992
Cornerstone University	Grand Rapids, Michigan	Interdenominational	1991
Covenant College	Lookout Mountain, Georgia	Presbyterian Church in America	1976
Crown College	St. Bonifacius, Minnesota	Christian and Missionary Alliance	1997
Dallas Baptist University	Dallas	Baptist General Convention of Texas	1984
Dordt University	Sioux Center, Iowa	Christian Reformed Church	1981
East Texas Baptist University	Marshall, Texas	Baptist General Convention of Texas	1995
Emmanuel University	Franklin Springs, Georgia	International Pentecostal Holiness Church	2011
Erskine College	Due West, South Carolina	Associate Reformed Presbyterian Church	1981
Evangel University	Springfield, Missouri	Assemblies of God USA	1976
Faulkner University	Montgomery, Alabama	Churches of Christ	2014
Fresno Pacific University	Fresno, California	Mennonite Brethren Church	1981
Geneva College	Beaver Falls, Pennsylvania	Reformed Presbyterian Church of North America	1976
George Fox University	Newberg, Oregon	Northwest Yearly Meeting of Friends	1976
Gordon College	Wenham, Massachusetts	Multi-Denominational	1976
Grace College & Seminary	Winona Lake, Indiana	Fellowship of Grace Brethren Churches	1976
Greenville University	Greenville, Illinois	Free Methodist Church	1976
Hannibal–LaGrange University	Hannibal, Missouri	Southern Baptist Convention	2010
Hardin–Simmons University	Abilene, Texas	Baptist General Convention of Texas	2003
Harding University	Searcy, Arkansas	Churches of Christ	2015
Hope International University	Fullerton, California	Christian churches and churches of Christ	1994
Houghton University	Houghton, New York	Wesleyan Church	1976
Houston Christian University	Houston	Baptist General Convention of Texas	2000
Howard Payne University	Brownwood, Texas	Baptist General Convention of Texas	2000
Huntington University	Huntington, Indiana	United Brethren Church	1978
Indiana Wesleyan University	Marion, Indiana	Wesleyan Church	1976
Jessup University	Rocklin, California	Nondenominational	2004
John Brown University	Siloam Springs, Arkansas	Inter-denominational	1976
Judson University	Elgin, Illinois	American Baptist Churches USA	1976
Kentucky Christian University	Grayson, Kentucky	Christian churches and churches of Christ	1999
King University	Bristol, Tennessee	Presbyterian Church (USA)	1979
Lee University	Cleveland, Tennessee	Church of God (Cleveland)	1981
LeTourneau University	Longview, Texas	Inter-denominational	1985
Lipscomb University	Nashville, Tennessee	Churches of Christ	1999
Los Angeles Pacific University	San Dimas, California		
Lubbock Christian University	Lubbock, Texas	Churches of Christ	2018
Malone University	Canton, Ohio	Evangelical Friends Church - Eastern Region	1976
Messiah University	Mechanicsburg, Pennsylvania	Inter-denominational	1976
Mid-America Christian University	Oklahoma City, Oklahoma	Church of God (Anderson)	
MidAmerica Nazarene University	Olathe, Kansas	Church of the Nazarene	1978
Milligan University	Milligan College, Tennessee	Christian Churches and Churches of Christ	1984
Mississippi College	Clinton, Mississippi	Southern Baptist Convention	2003
Missouri Baptist University	Creve Coeur, Missouri	Southern Baptist Convention	2005
Montreat College	Montreat, North Carolina	Inter-denominational	1985
Mount Vernon Nazarene University	Mount Vernon, Ohio	Church of the Nazarene	1982
Multnomah University	Portland, Oregon		2007
North Central University	Minneapolis, Minnesota	Assemblies of God USA	2010
North Park University	Chicago	Evangelical Covenant Church	1981
Northwest Nazarene University	Nampa, Idaho	Church of the Nazarene	1979
Northwest University	Kirkland, Washington	Assemblies of God USA	1992
Northwestern College	Orange City, Iowa	Reformed Church in America	1978
Oklahoma Baptist University	Shawnee, Oklahoma	Southern Baptist Convention	1994
Oklahoma Christian University	Oklahoma City	Churches of Christ	1998
Olivet Nazarene University	Bourbonnais, Illinois	Church of the Nazarene	1978
Oral Roberts University	Tulsa, Oklahoma		1997
Ouachita Baptist University	Arkadelphia, Arkansas	Arkansas Baptist State Convention	2018
Palm Beach Atlantic University	West Palm Beach, Florida	Inter-denominational	1982
Point Loma Nazarene University	San Diego	Church of the Nazarene	1979
Point University	West Point, Georgia	Nondenominatonal	2018
Redeemer University	Ancaster, Ontario	Christian Reformed Church	1986
Regent University	Virginia Beach, Virginia	Inter-denominational	1995
Roberts Wesleyan University	North Chili, New York	Free Methodist Church	1982
San Diego Christian College	Santee, California	Nondenominational	2008
Seattle Pacific University	Seattle	Free Methodist	1976
Simpson University	Redding, California	Christian and Missionary Alliance	1976
Southeastern University	Lakeland, Florida	Assemblies of God USA	2002
Southern Adventist University	Collegedale, Tennessee	Seventh-day Adventist Church	2022
Southern Nazarene University	Bethany, Oklahoma	Church of the Nazarene	1978
Southern Wesleyan University	Central, South Carolina	Wesleyan Church	1978
Southwest Baptist University	Bolivar, Missouri	Southern Baptist Convention	1995
Southwestern Adventist University	Keene, Texas	Seventh-day adventist	1995
Spring Arbor University	Spring Arbor, Michigan	Free Methodist Church	1978
Sterling College	Sterling, Kansas	Nondenominational	1980
Tabor College	Hillsboro, Kansas	Mennonite Brethren Church	1979
Taylor University	Upland, Indiana	Nondenominational	1976
Toccoa Falls College	Toccoa, Georgia	Christian and Missionary Alliance	2008
Trevecca Nazarene University	Nashville, Tennessee	Church of the Nazarene	1980
Trinity Christian College	Palos Heights, Illinois		1980
Trinity International University	Deerfield, Illinois	Evangelical Free Church	1976
Trinity Western University	Langley, British Columbia	Evangelical Free Church	1986
University of Mary Hardin–Baylor	Belton, Texas	Baptist General Convention of Texas	2008
University of Northwestern – St. Paul	Roseville, Minnesota	Nondenominational	1980
University of the Southwest	Hobbs, New Mexico	Nondenominational	2008
Vanguard University	Costa Mesa, California	Assemblies of God USA	1981
Walla Walla University	College Place, Washington	Seventh-day Adventist Church	
Warner University	Lake Wales, Florida	Church of God	1982
Warner Pacific University	Portland, Oregon	Church of God (Anderson)	
Wayland Baptist University	Plainview, Texas	Baptist General Convention of Texas	2021
Westmont College	Montecito, California		1976
Wheaton College	Wheaton, Illinois	Inter-denominational	1976
Wisconsin Lutheran College	Milwaukee, Wisconsin	Wisconsin Evangelical Lutheran Synod	2015
York University	York, Nebraska	Churches of Christ	2012

=== Associate member institutions ===
Associate members must meet all the same criteria as governing members except institutional type and accreditation. Thus, institutions that do not offer a comprehensive undergraduate program (including Bible colleges or seminaries) can be associate members.

Institution	Location	Denominational affiliation	Year Joined
Arizona Christian University	Phoenix, Arizona	Nondenominational	2006
Asbury Theological Seminary	Wilmore, Kentucky	Inter-denominational	2002
Crandall University	Moncton, New Brunswick	Canadian Baptist	1999
Dallas Theological Seminary	Dallas, Texas	Nondenominational	2007
Denver Seminary	Littleton, Colorado	Nondenominational	2019
Fuller Theological Seminary	Pasadena, California	Nondenominational	1996
Gordon-Conwell Theological Seminary	South Hamilton, Massachusetts	Nondenominational	2016
Johnson University	Knoxville, Tennessee		2007
Life Pacific University	San Dimas, California	International Church of the Foursquare Gospel	2014
McMaster Divinity College	Hamilton, Ontario		2007
Mid-Atlantic Christian University	Elizabeth City, North Carolina	Christian churches and churches of Christ	2016
Moody Bible Institute	Chicago, Illinois		2001
Ohio Christian University	Circleville, Ohio	Churches of Christ in Christian Union	2017
Ozark Christian College	Joplin, Missouri	Christian churches and churches of Christ	2019
Prairie College	Three Hills, Alberta	Inter-denominational	2004
Providence University College and Theological Seminary	Otterburne, Manitoba	Inter-denominational	1996
Southwestern Christian University	Bethany, Oklahoma	International Pentecostal Holiness Church	2015
The King's University	Southlake, Texas	Inter-denominational	2021
Tyndale University	Toronto, Ontario	Nondenominational	1997
University of Valley Forge	Phoenixville, Pennsylvania	Assemblies of God	2003
Wesley Bible Seminary	Ridgeland, Mississippi	Wesleyan	2025

=== Collaborative partner institutions ===
Collaborative partners must meet the first four criteria set for governing members (Christian mission, institutional type and accreditation, cooperation and participation, and institutional integrity), but may depart from last two: employment policies and Christian distinctions and advocacy. Institutions that do not require all of their faculty to be professing Christians and/or do not agree with all elements of the CCCU's advocacy agenda, but nevertheless wish to take part in the council's programs and partnerships, may be collaborative partners.

Institution	Location	Denominational affiliation	Year Joined
Baylor University	Waco, Texas	Baptist General Convention of Texas	2004
Booth University College	Winnipeg, Manitoba	Salvation Army	
Friends University	Wichita, Kansas	Nondenominational	2014
Pepperdine University	Malibu, California	Churches of Christ	2010
Samford University	Homewood, Alabama	Southern Baptist	2010

=== International affiliates ===
The CCCU has more than 30 colleges and universities in countries outside the U.S. and Canada.

Institution	Location	Denominational affiliation	Year Joined
Africa International University	Nairobi, Kenya		2005
Africa Nazarene University	Nairobi, Kenya	Church of the Nazarene	2002
Alphacrucis College	Parramatta, New South Wales	Assemblies of God	2005
Avondale University College	Cooranbong, New South Wales		2010
Central University College	Accra, Ghana	International Central Gospel Church	2001
Baekseok University	Cheonan, South Chungcheong, South Korea		2019
Christelijke Hogeschool Ede	Ede, Netherlands		2003
Christian Heritage College	Brisbane, Australia		2013
Christ's College Taipei	Taipei, Taiwan	Presbyterian Church in America	1999
CSI Bishop Appasamy College of Arts and Sciences	Coimbatore, India	Church of South India Trust Association	2001
Daystar University	Nairobi, Kenya	Non-Denominational Christian	2022
Eastern College Australia	Melbourne, Australia		2019
Emmaus University of Haiti	Cercaville, Acul du Nord, Haiti	Wesleyan	2019
Excelsia College	Macquarie Park, New South Wales		2000
Handong Global University	Pohang, South Korea		2001
Jerusalem University College	Jerusalem, Israel		1998
John Wesley Theological College	Budapest, Hungary		2003
Károli Gáspár University of the Reformed Church in Hungary	Budapest, Hungary		2014
Laidlaw College	Auckland, New Zealand		2000
LCC International University	Klaipėda, Lithuania		1997
Liverpool Hope University	Liverpool, United Kingdom		2020
Morling College	Macquarie Park, New South Wales		2020
North Haiti Christian University	Limbé, Nord, Haiti	American Baptist	2005
Queensland University	Port-au-Prince, Haiti		2003
Sheng-te Christian College	Taoyuan City, Taiwan		2000
Tabor (Australia)	Adelaide, Australia, Australia		2020
Tokyo Christian University	Inzai, Chiba, Japan		1995
Tunghai University	Taichung City, Taiwan	Nondenominational	2021
Uganda Christian University	Mukono, Uganda		2000
Universidad Nacional Evangelica	Santo Domingo, Dominican Republic		2015
Universitas Pelita Harapan	Banten, Indonesia		2003
University of the Holy Land	Jerusalem, Israel		2017
Wycliffe Hall	Oxford		2006
