= Reformed Presbyterian Church of Australia =

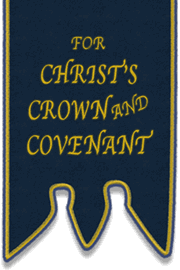
- The "Blue Banner"
- Classification: Protestant
- Orientation: Reformed
- Polity: Presbyterian
- Associations: Reformed Presbyterian Church
- Region: Victoria, Australia
- Origin: 1858; Geelong
- Branched from: Reformed Presbyterian Church of Ireland
- Separations: Reformed Presbyterian Church of the Philippines
- Congregations: 3
- Members: 260

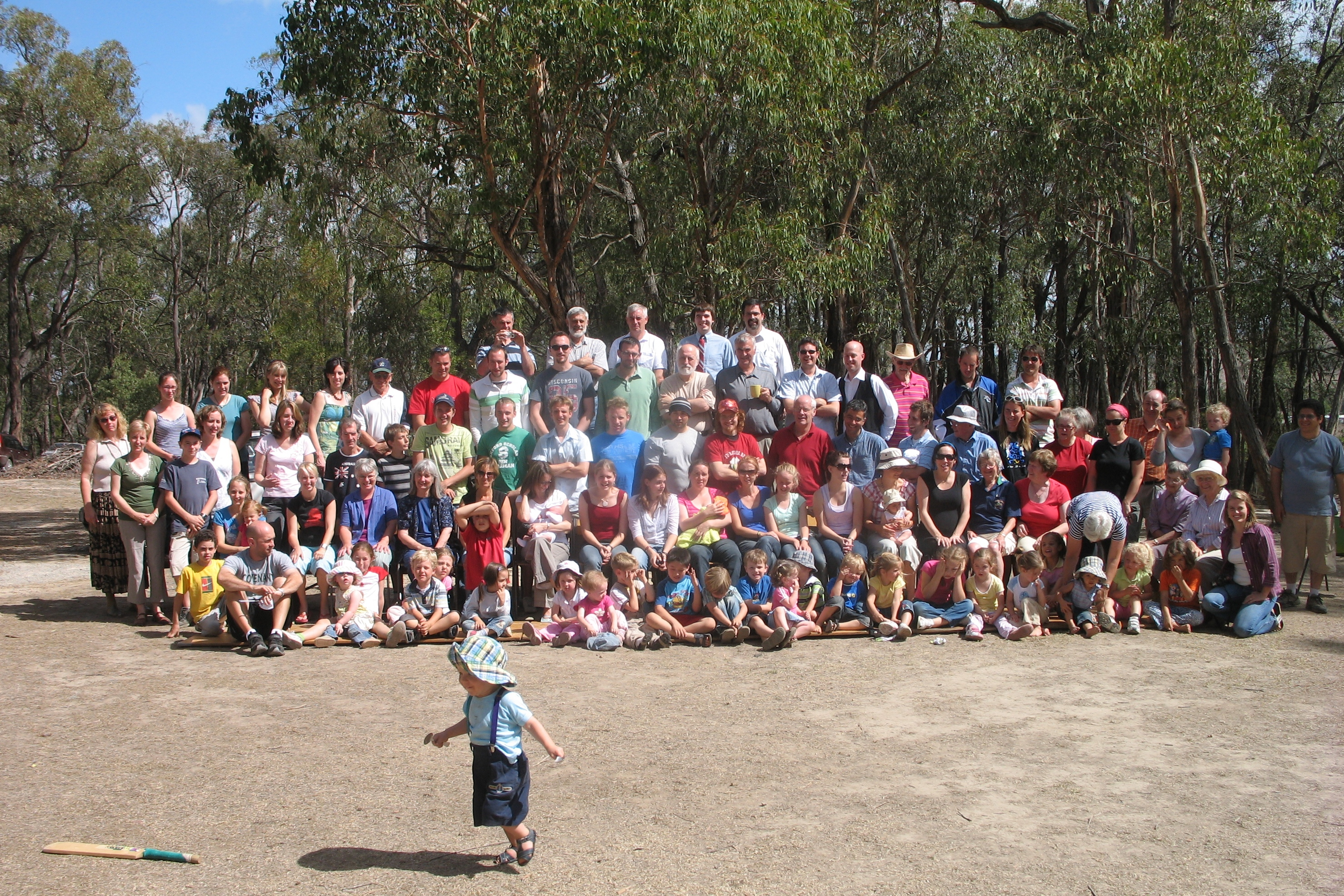
Reformed Presbyterians at a family conference

The Reformed Presbyterian Church of Australia is a Reformed church in Australia. It is a small Presbyterian church numbering slightly over 200 persons with its largest congregation in the area of Geelong, Victoria. The first church, in Geelong, was started in 1858. It links itself historically with those in the Covenanter movement in Scotland who did not accept the settlement of Presbyterianism in that country in 1690, and has sister denominational relations with the Reformed Presbyterian churches of North America, Ireland, and Scotland. Fraternal relations exist with the Presbyterian Church of Eastern Australia.

== History ==
A number of Reformed Presbyterians had migrated from Scotland or Ireland to Australia. A number who did not join other branches of Presbyterianism were against occasional hearing, and they wanted a minister of their own. They wrote to the parent church requesting this. Rev. A. M. Moore eventually answered. He was ordained in Belfast 18 August 1857, and arrived in Melbourne in late December 1857, to commence the work in Geelong which he served until his death in 1897. Geelong was the only congregation for many years, the most notable minister after Moore being H.K. Mack who served 1909–46. Congregations were begun in McKinnon, Victoria (1933 begun/1946 organised under Rev. W. R. McEwen), Frankston, Victoria (1971/1977), and Sunbury, Victoria (1979/1981, closed 2006).

In 1959, Rev. A. Barkley, RP minister in Geelong, became the founding principal of the Reformed Theological College.

In 1974, the Australian Presbytery petitioned the parent body, the Reformed Presbyterian Church of Ireland, and was made a separate denomination (or church) on 12 June. In former times, church law required members to believe that the Solemn League and Covenant were still binding and forbade them from participating in government because the Constitution does not explicitly make the Australia an officially Christian country; these provisions have been repealed.

The Frankston congregation, after closing in 1989, was revived around 2004 as a preaching station of the McKinnon congregation. The organising pastor from February 2006 was Rev. Ed Blackwood from the United States. In 2008 it became a separate congregation meeting in a hall in Frankston South. The pastor resigned in August 2015 and returned to the U.S. Pastor Andrew McCracken moved to Frankston from the United States to take up the work again in March 2020.

== Organisations ==
=== Theological Seminaries ===
- Reformed Theological College (in conjunction with the Christian Reformed Church of Australia and the Reformed Churches of New Zealand)

== See also ==
- List of Presbyterian and Reformed denominations in Australia
- Presbyterian polity
- Reformed Presbyterian churches
