= Christian Business Faculty Association =

American Christian organization

Christian Business Faculty Association (CBFA)
- Location: United States
- Key people: Dr. Scott A. Quatro, Board Chair
- Website: CBFA Website

The Christian Business Faculty Association (CBFA) is an organization created in the United States in the 1990s to further Christian education in colleges and universities. As of 2009 the organization had a total of 400 Christian business faculty members currently employed at colleges and universities. The CBFA holds an annual conference of American and international Christian business faculty. The CBFA offers programs for college students and faculty to be able to travel overseas and study abroad.

The CBFA is led by an eleven-member board. Seven of the board positions are elected by the membership. Each year, two new members of the board are elected at the annual conference for a three-year term. After his or her first year on the board, one of those individuals is chosen to become the vice-chair/chair-elect of the board; that person then becomes the chair of the board, and then serves an additional year as the immediate past chair. The year in which each board member's term ends is given in parentheses.

Four board positions are appointed by the elected members of the board: the secretary, the treasurer, the senior editor, and the program chair

== History ==
The association began in April, 1980 when the leaders of the American Studies Program and the Council for Christian Colleges and Universities (then known as the Christian College Coalition) organized a meeting of 12-15 business professors from member schools in Washington, D.C. The group kept growing every year. Over 40 professors attended the year after in Washington, D.C. Also Regional conferences started at several member schools in 1982 and 1983. In 1984 over 70 faculty attended a convention at Seattle Pacific University on business ethics sponsored by the CCCU with a grant from the Murdock Foundation. The convention created friendships and interest that pushed the professors to have more meetings. In 1987, the association appointed a steering committee with regional representatives that decided to increments services to the membership, and the creation of a regular newsletter.

== Awards ==
The CBFA awards three honored recipients each year:

- The Chewning Award was established to honor integration of personal faith and business as modeled by its first recipient, Dr. Richard C. Chewning.

Past recipients also include:

2017	Dr. Terry Truitt	Anderson University
2016	Dr. Vince LeFrance	Messiah College
2015	Dr. John Kiser	Dordt College
2014	Dr. Ken Bates	Houghon College
2013	Dr. Jeffrey Fawcett	Grace College
2012	Dr. Kent Saunders	Anderson University
2011	John D. Beckett	R.W. Beckett Corporation
2010	Dr. Becky Havens	Point Loma Nazarene University
2009	Dr. Doyle Lucas	Anderson University
2008	Dr. Steven L. Bovee	Roberts Wesleyan College
2007	Dr. Joe Walenciak	John Brown University
2006	C. William Pollard	ServiceMaster Corporation
2005	Dr. Yvonne S. Smith	University of LaVerne
2004	Dr. Robert H. Roller	LeTourneau University
2003	Dr. Linwood T. Geiger	Eastern University
2002	Dr. Ken Armstrong	Anderson University
2001	Dr. Sharon G. Johnson	Cedarville University
2000	Dr. John A. Bernbaum	Russian American Christian University
1999	Dr. Lisa Klein Surdyk	Seattle Pacific University

- The Johnson Award recognizes God-honoring intellectual contributions by individuals who incorporate learning, business, and faith. For the creation of dynamic process promoting Christian faith integration in business championed by its first recipient, Dr. Sharon Johnson.

Past recipients also include:

2017	Dr. Kent Saunders	Anderson University
2016	Dr. Timothy Redmer	Regent University
2015	Dr. Bruno Dyck	University of Manitoba
2014	Dr. David Burns	Xavier University
2013	Dr. Michael Cafferky	Southern Adventist University
2012	Dr. Margaret Edgell	Calvin College
2011	Dr. Yvonne Smith	University of LaVerne
2010	Dr. Monty Lynn	Abilene Christian University
2009	Dr. Steve Vanderveen	Hope College
2008	Dr. Brian E. Porter	Hope College
2007	Dr. Richard C. Chewning	John Brown University
2006	Dr. Sharon Johnson	Cedarville University

- The Barnabas Award is named after Barnabas, a disciple of Jesus Christ in the first century. This award recognizes individuals who have served CBFA by serving and participating joyfully and enthusiastically and contributing to CBFA's effectiveness and esprit de corps.

Past recipients include:

2017	Dr. Julia Underwood	Azusa Pacific University
2016	Dr. Yvonne Smith	University of LaVerne
2015	Dr. Kevin Hughes	Mt. Vernon Nazarene University
2014	Dr. Keith Starcher	Indiana Wesleyan University
2013	Dr. Don Daake	Olivet Nazarene University
2012	Dr. Sharon Johnson	Charleston Southern University
2011	Dr. Robert H. Roller	Mt. Vernon Nazarene University
2010	Dr. Tim Redmer	Regent University
2009	Kenneth Bates	Houghton College
2008	Dr. Larry Rottmeyer	Taylor University
2007	Ronald Walker	Cedarville University
2006	Richard A. Halberg	Houghton College

- The Teaching Award celebrates the Christ-like teaching of individuals who emulate the character, engagement, and calling of Christ to the work and ministry of transformational education.

Past recipients include:

2017	Dr. Monty Lynn	Abilene Christian University
2016	Dr. Chris Neuenschwander	Anderson University
2015	Steve Cosentino	Point Loma Nazarene University
2014	Dr. Michael Wiese	Anderson University (IN)
2013	Dr. David Hagenbuch	Messiah College
2012	Dr. Margaret Britt	Mt. Vernon Nazarene University

== Membership ==
Membership is open to college and university faculty members, current or retired, full-time, part-time, or adjunct who agree with the following:

- That Jesus Christ is the Son of God and through His atonement is the mediator between God and man.
- That the word of God expressed in the Bible is inspired by God and is authoritative in the development of Christian faith and practice.
- That the Christian faith has significant implications for the structure and practice of business.
- That developing Christian education for business practice should be undertaken as a cooperative venture of this organization.

Members pay annual dues of $50.

== Journals ==
The CBFA publishes a journal known as The Journal of Biblical Integration in Business (JBIB). This journal has a yearly publication and is sent out to members of the association who have subscribed through the membership dues of the CBFA.

The Journal states that its proposition is "All Scripture is God-breathed and is useful for teaching, rebuking, correcting, and training in righteousness, so that the man of God may be thoroughly equipped for every good work" (II Timothy 3:16-17)."

The CBFA states that purpose of the journal is for faculty and business professionals to share ideas and perspectives on how to best prepare students to be able to live their Christian faith in the professional workplace.

Michael Cafferky is the editor of JBIB.

CBFA also publishes the "Christian Business Academy Review (CBAR) with the purpose of promoting Christian business education that focus on 1) creative instruction, 2) curriculum development, 3) professional issues and 4) research in business education. It is also published yearly and sent out to members of the association. Emmett Dulaney serves as the editor.
