= Uniting (newspaper) =

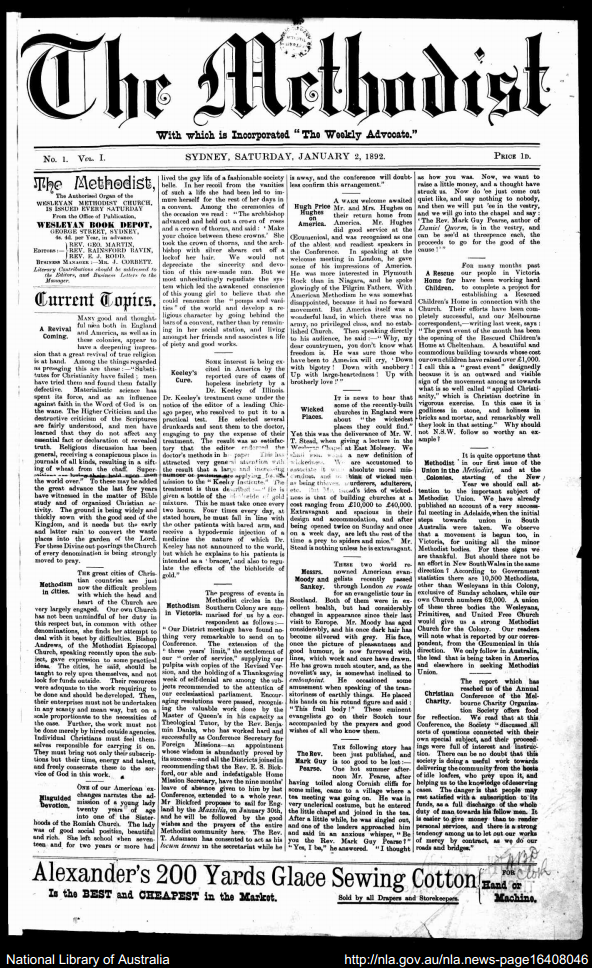
Front page of The Methodist on 2 January 1892.

Uniting was a weekly English language broadsheet newspaper published in Sydney, New South Wales, Australia. It was first published in 1892 as The Methodist, and subsequently for about a year as The Methodist and Congregationalist, before continuing as Forward.

== History ==
Issue No. 1 of Vol. 1 of The Methodist was first published on 2 January 1892 by the Wesleyan Methodist Church. At this time it incorporated the newspaper The Weekly Advocate. The publishers aimed their publication at Methodists within New South Wales, but hoped to gain a wider audience. Issue No. 1 of Vol. 1 of

The Methodist briefly changed its title to The Methodist and Congregationalist in 1976 before being retitled as Forward in 1977. The title changed to Uniting in 1982 and ceased publication in 1987.

== Digitisation ==
The paper has been digitised as part of the Australian Newspapers Digitisation Program project of the National Library of Australia.

== See also ==
- List of newspapers in Australia
- List of newspapers in New South Wales
