= Nazarene Theological College =

Nazarene Theological College may refer to:

- Nazarene Theological College (Australia) in Thornlands, Queensland
- Nazarene Theological College (England) in Didsbury, Manchester

== See also ==
- Nazarene Theological Seminary, a Christian seminary affiliated with the Church of the Nazarene
