= World Harvest Bible College (disambiguation) =

World Harvest Bible College may also refer to:

- Valor Christian College, Columbus, Ohio

== See also ==
- Harvest Bible College, Melbourne, Australia
