= Denise A. Austin =

Australian Pentecostal historian

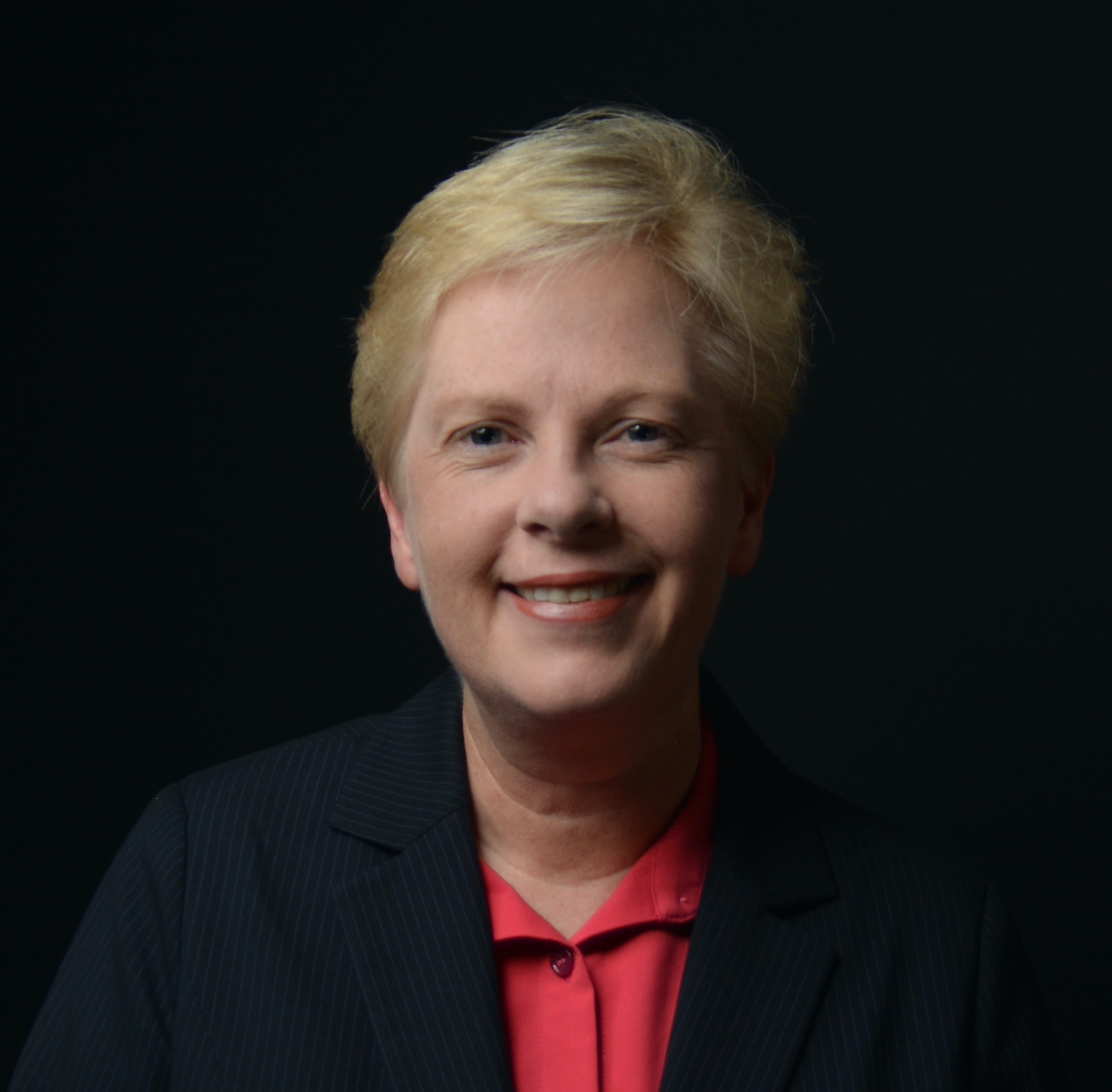
- Education: University of Queensland
- Occupations: Theologian, historian
- Website: https://www.deniseaaustin.com/

Denise A. Austin is an Australian Pentecostal historian, particularly focused on Australia and the Asia-Pacific region.

Austin was the Deputy Vice President of Research and Standards, and Professor of History at Alphacrucis College. She was also the Director of the Australasian Pentecostal Studies Centre.

== Early life and education ==
Denise A. Austin was born in Brisbane in 1969 to Alan and Merle Anderson. She met and married her husband Garry while studying at Rhema Bible College in Townsville. Together, they worked as Assemblies of God missionaries in Hong Kong before returning to Australia for further study.

Austin received her PhD from the University of Queensland. Her 2004 dissertation and subsequent book (published 2011) is entitled Kingdom-Minded People: Christian Identity and the Contributions of Chinese Business Christians.

== Career ==
In 2006, Austin became the Academic Dean of Garden City College and began lecturing on Church History and Missions. In 2009, she started working at Southern Cross College which changed its name to Alphacrucis College later that same year. She is actively working with TEQSA to help Alphacrucis College become the first Pentecostal training college in Australia to achieve university status. She is an ordained minister with Australian Christian Churches.

Austin has secured over $100,000 in grants to fund the research of Pentecostal history. Austin has also written the biographies of several key figures in Australian history including Andrew Evans, founder of the Family First political party, as well as the biography of bass player George McArdle from the Little River Band.

An article by Austin about the Prime Minister of Australia, Scott Morrison's personal faith and its influence on his response to women's rights and workplace sexual harassment, was published in the Sydney Morning Herald on 19 April 2021. Seven letters in response were published the following day, with several suggesting that the Prime Minister's faith was not the problem, but rather his actions in response to these issues.

== Selected publications ==
=== Books ===
- Austin, Denise A. (2009). The Man from Little River: The Story of George McArdle, Former Bass Player for the Little River Band. Ark House Press. ISBN 9781921589034.
- Austin, Denise A. (2011). 'Kingdom-Minded' People: Christian Identity and the Contributions of Chinese Business Christians. Brill. ISBN 978-9004204027.
- Austin, Denise A. (2017). Jesus First: The Life and Leadership of Andrew Evans. Love of Books. ISBN 9780648033493.
- Austin, Denise A.; Jacqueline Grey; Paul W. Lewis, eds. (2019). Asia Pacific Pentecostalism. Brill. ISBN 9789004396708.

=== Chapters ===
- Austin, Denise A. (2017). ""Flowing Together": The Origins and Early Development of Hillsong Church within Assemblies of God in Australia". In Tanya Riches; Tom Wagner (eds.). The Hillsong Movement Examined. Palgrave Macmillan. pp. 21–37. doi:10.1007/978-3-319-59656-3_2. ISBN 978-3-319-59655-6.
- Austin, Denise A. (2020). "Women and Guangdong Native-Place Charity in Chinese Australian Pentecostalism: The Miracle of Grace". In John Fitzgerald; Hon-ming Yip (eds.). Chinese Diaspora Charity and the Cantonese Pacific, 1850–1949. Hong Kong University Press. pp. 173–192. ISBN 9789888528264.
- Austin, Denise A. (2020). "Andrew Evans: The Making of an Australian Pentecostal Politician". In C. Rocha; M. Hutchinson; K. Openshaw (eds.). Australian Pentecostal and Charismatic Movements: Arguments from the Margins. Leiden: Brill. ISBN 9789004425798.
- Austin, Denise A.; Perry, David (2021). "Developing a Research and Scholarship Framework: An Australian Christian Higher Education Case Study". Innovating Christian Education Research. Brill. pp. 125–142. doi:10.1007/978-981-15-8856-3_9. ISBN 978-981-15-8855-6. S2CID 234263862.

=== Articles ===
- Austin, Denise A. (2017). ""A contagious church": Theological influences of Pentecostalism in Sydney, 1916-2016". St Mark's Review. 242: 114–132.
- Austin, Denise A.; Ulzii-Davaadar, Togtokh (4 November 2020). "Pentecostalism in Mongolia: A Case Study of Mongolia Assemblies of God". Inner Asia. 22 (2). Brill: 277–298. doi:10.1163/22105018-12340151. S2CID 228833790.
