= Reformed Theological College =

Theological college in Melbourne, Australia

- Type: Private
- Established: 1954
- Principal: Phillip Scheepers
- Location: Melbourne, Australia; 37°48′46.999″S 144°57′35.106″E
- Campus: Urban
- Website: www.rtc.edu.au

The Reformed Theological College (RTC) is the theological college supported by the Christian Reformed Churches of Australia, the Reformed Churches of New Zealand, and the Reformed Presbyterian Church of Australia. It is located in the Melbourne CBD, Victoria, Australia. It was established in 1954.

RTC is accredited through the Australian University of Theology and is a member of the South Pacific Association of Bible Colleges.

The range of courses includes pastoral ministry, Christian service, life in the workplace and personal spiritual growth.

RTC has published the Vox Reformata annual journal since 1962.

== History ==
The school began in 1954 in the Reformed Presbyterian Church in Geelong before moving to the former Geelong Grammar School building in 1961. In 1999, the college purchased part of the Geelong Grammar Junior campus in Highton and moved to that location.

In 2025, Reformed Theological College relocated its operations from the Waurn Ponds campus to the Melbourne CBD, where its main administration, faculty offices, and library holdings are now situated.

== RTC Melbourne Campus ==
RTC classes are held at the Melbourne campus in addition to online and live-streamed classes. A library is located on the Melbourne campus.

== Notable alumni ==
The founding members of the band Sons of Korah attended RTC and formed the band while studying there.
