= Christian Leaders' Training College =

Bible college in Papua New Guinea

- Established: 1964
- Location: Banz, Papua New Guinea
- Website: www.cltc.ac.pg

The Christian Leaders' Training College of Papua New Guinea (CLTC) is an interdenominational Bible college. It was established in 1964 and offers theological study at up to Masters level.

== Location ==
The college is located near the township of Banz, in the Western Highlands Province of Papua New Guinea. The nearest major city is Mount Hagen, which is a 60-minute drive from CLTC, mostly on sealed road. A major medical centre is located approximately 15 minutes drive away, at Kudjip.

CLTC is located next to the Sigri coffee and Bunem-Wo tea plantations, which are renowned for producing some of the best quality tea and coffee in Papua New Guinea.

CLTC also has satellite centres in Port Moresby and Lae, Papua New Guinea's two largest cities.

== Campus ==
Most of the students reside on the campus, which has a population of approximately 500. Many of the residents of CLTC are involved in agricultural support programmes, which help to support the students financially during their studies. The college operates a hatchery which provides day-old chickens for the local markets, abattoir and market gardens. The laying section also provides table eggs that are sold throughout the provinces. Previously it also operated a dairy, but this was shut down for commercial reasons in the 1990s and converted to the abattoir.

The Campus also contains its own corner store and medical clinic that services the college and the surrounding local communities. The theological library contains approximately 30,000 books which is one of the largest in Papua New Guinea.

CLTC's faculty includes both Nationally and Internationally trained theological lecturers. Its students are drawn from across the South Pacific, including Papua New Guinea, the Solomon Islands and Vanuatu.

== Courses offered ==
CLTC offers Diploma of Ministry, Bachelor of Theology, and Master of Theology degrees.

CLTC also offers a Graduate Refresher Courses and Pastoral courses, and Theological Education by Extension (TEE), a distance programme at Certificate Level.

CLTC was a member of the South Pacific Association of Evangelical Colleges (until that association was wound up).

== Journal ==
CLTC publishes the Melanesian Journal of Theology (MJT) on behalf of the Melanesian Association of Theological Schools. MJT was established in 1985, and was produced in print until 2012, and exclusively online from 2013.
