= Christian Reformed Churches of Australia =

Christian denomination in Australia

- Classification: Protestant
- Theology: Reformed
- Polity: Presbyterian
- Associations: International Conference of Reformed Churches
- Region: Australia
- Origin: 1951; Sydney NSW
- Branched from: Reformed Churches in the Netherlands
- Congregations: 59
- Members: 7808
- Official website: https://crca.org.au

The Christian Reformed Churches of Australia (CRCA), formerly known as the Reformed Churches of Australia (RCA) is a Christian denomination established in Australia belonging to the Reformed/Presbyterian tradition.

== Background ==
This denomination has its roots in the European Reformation of the 15th and 16th centuries, affirming the beliefs that God grants salvation by grace alone, in Christ alone and through faith alone.

The denomination is part of the worldwide family of reformed churches which came into being at the time of the Reformation, and declared themselves reformed from the teachings and practices of the Roman Catholic Church at that time. Whereas Martin Luther was the champion of the Reformation in Germany, John Calvin was the champion of the Reformation in Switzerland, the Netherlands and northern Europe. It is John Calvin's understanding of the Bible, as spelled out in his Institutes of the Christian Religion, that forms the doctrinal basis of the various reformed churches.

This doctrinal basis is further summarized in the three Confessions to which the continental reformed churches adhere:

- Belgic Confession
- Heidelberg Catechism
- Canons of Dordt

And by the Confession to which the Presbyterian churches adhere:

- Westminster Confession

== History ==
This denomination was established by post-World War II Dutch migrants in 1951. Many of the migrants had been members of the Reformed Churches in the Netherlands. They had no desire to start new congregations in their new home, and had been advised to seek the pastoral care of the Scottish Free Presbyterians (i.e. the Presbyterian Church of Eastern Australia) upon their arrival in Australia. The differences between the culture of the Australian-Scottish Presbyterians and the Reformed Netherlanders was a hindrance, but the real problem was the liturgical restrictions where no instrumental accompaniment was allowed and only psalms were sung. The Dutch migrants struggled to find churches in Australia which embraced and upheld Biblical and Reformed theology, with a national profile that could enfold these new settlers, and was governed according to reformed tradition. For these reasons, in December 1951, they organised a separate denomination, initially composed of Reformed Churches in Sydney, Penguin and Melbourne. The new denomination held their first Synod in June 1952 in premises owned by the Presbyterian Church of Eastern Australia at East St Kilda. By 1955, some dozen congregations were formed in all Australian states, and the denomination, then named the Reformed Churches of Australia, grew to around 10,500 by the early 1990s, when it was renamed the Christian Reformed Churches Of Australia.

Currently there is an active membership of around 7800 in over fifty churches spread throughout Australia. This steady decline is due to a desire to assimilate in their new country, welcome changes in the Anglican and Presbyterian Churches in some states bringing these denominations theologically closer, and certain aspects of generational change. Numerous South African immigrants in the last decade have slowed this trend, as have converts from other denominations. From exclusively Dutch beginnings, the CRCA is now a culturally diverse group, reflecting the character of Australian society, and is seeking to proclaim the Christian message in a contemporary and relevant way.

The denomination has been instrumental in the establishment of many Christian schools, including the Illawarra Christian School, Sutherland Shire Christian School, Tyndale Christian School (New South Wales), Calvin Christian School Kingston Tasmania, and Covenant College (ACT). It is actively engaged in Christian missions both within Australia and abroad. One of these is The NSW THING. They have established their own theological college, the Reformed Theological College in Geelong, Victoria. They also own Wedderburn Christian Campsite, a Christian camp site in the outskirts of Sydney. They also support SWIM Solomon Islands, which is a missionary outreach in the Solomon Islands. The CRCA also produces a denominational magazine titled "Trowel And Sword"

Since 2000, the CRCA has adopted a fourfold mission statement to remind and empower its member churches to set and focus on their primary goal of equipping God's people for the service of God both within and beyond itself. The four tasks are headed: Pray, Multiply, Train and Align.

== Structure ==
The basic unit is the local church, which is governed by the local session as "elected" by the congregation. All sessions within a geographical area (typically on a statewide basis) meet every 3-4 months as a classis.

Nationally, delegates meet every three years as a Synod. The synod deals only with issues raised by a classis. Therefore, all synodical issues were originally raised by a session, brought to a classis, before coming to the synod. At synod, policies for the church are formulated, directions considered, and new ways forward explored. In between synodical meetings the financial commitments of the member churches are administered by a Synodical Board of Management, while all other matters affecting the church as a whole are looked after by the Synodical Interim Committee.

Permanent committees of synod include:

- World Transform: Distributes funds collected for overseas relief work
- Solomons Islands Workgroup: Workgroup supporting the missionary work carried out in the Solomon Islands.

== Notable members ==
Senator Eric Abetz is a member of the Kingston Christian Reformed Church .

== Local congregations ==
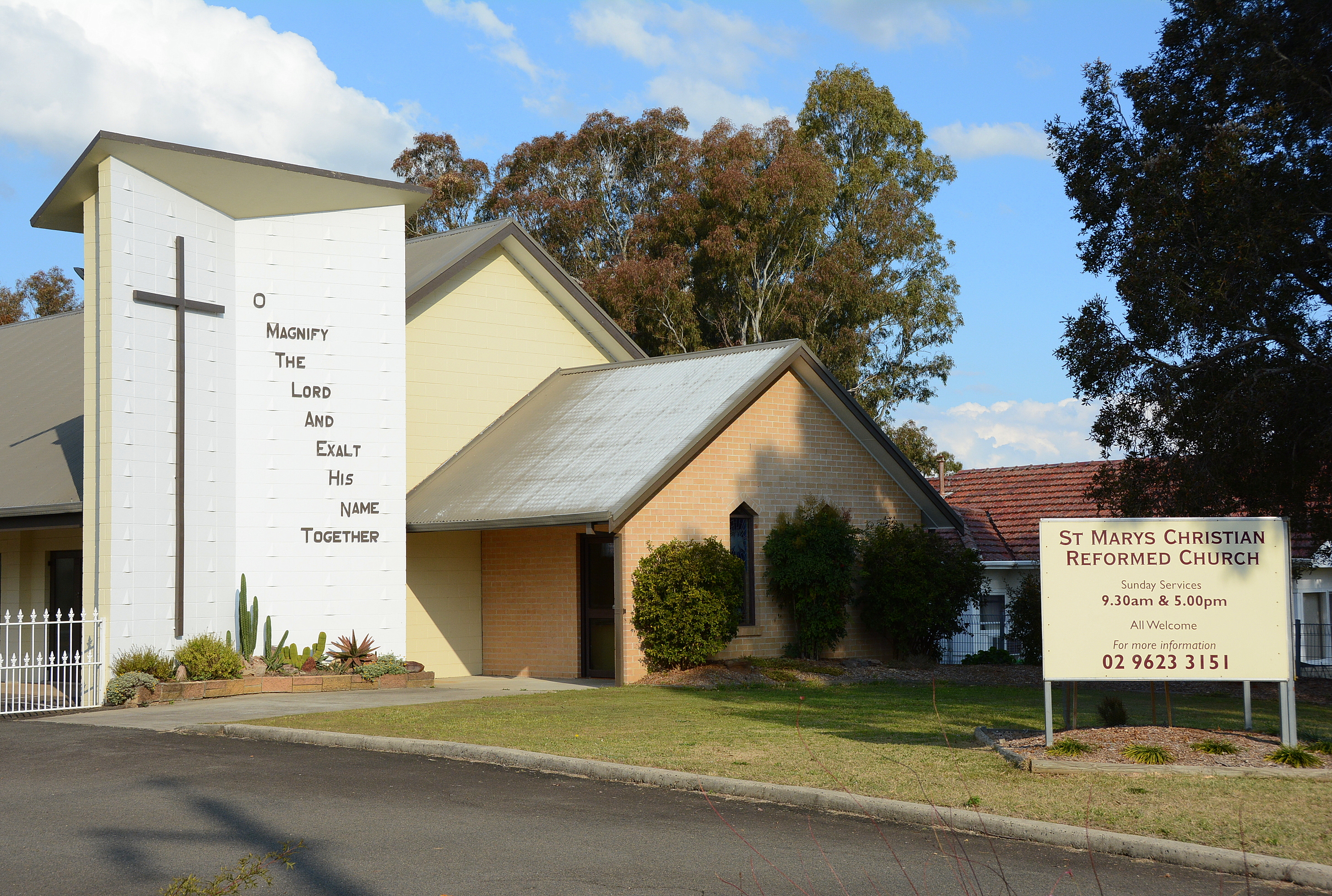
Colyton Christian Reformed Church, NSW 2760

Member churches of the CRCA are found in every state of Australia, along with one church in the Australian Capital Territory. The member churches, listed alphabetically with their dates of institution, are as follows:

Australian Capital Territory

- Reformed Church of Canberra - Rivett (26 March 1975)

New South Wales

- Christian Reformed Church of Blaxland - Blaxland (5 July 1980)
- Christian Reformed Church of Dee Why - Dee Why (1 March 1954)
- Hope Christian Community Church - St Marys (1 January 1965)
- Indonesian Reformed Church - Castle Hill (2 April 2003)
- Christian Reformed Church of Macarthur - Cobbitty (1 December 1974)
- New Life Christian Church - Woodcroft (21 April 1953)
- Christian Reformed Church of Newcastle - Argenton (25 May 1955)
- Tanilba Christian Reformed Church - Tanilba Bay (25 May 1955)
- Christian Reformed Church of Sutherland Shire - Barden Ridge (1 January 1960)
- Christian Reformed Church of Sydney - Castle Hills (16 December 1951)
- Reformed Church of Wamberal - Wamberal (1 May 1976)
- Christian Reformed Church of Wollongong - Fairy Meadow (16 December 1951)

Queensland

- Christian Reformation Community Church - Inala (13 March 1965)
- Christian Reformed Church of Toowoomba - Glenvale (19 April 1969)
- Wishart Community Church - Wishart (30 August 1980)
- Oasis Church - Bray Park (11 October 1980)
- Christian Reformed Church of Tivoli - Tivoli (9 February 1991)
- Redlands Christian Reformed Church - Ormiston (28 August 1999)
- Open House Christian Reformed Church - Gaven (12 August 2000)
- Westside Christian Church - Camira (29 November 2003)

South Australia

- Campbelltown Christian Reformed Church - Campbelltown (24 October 1954)
- Christian Reformed Church of Elizabeth - Elizabeth Vale (31 October 1971)
- Hallett Cove Christian Reformed Church - Hallett Cove (13 February 2011)

Tasmania

- Bay Christian Church - Blackmans Bay (3 January 2010)
- Good News Christian Church - Howrah (9 May 1960)
- Christian Reformed Church of Kingston - Kingston (24 February 1952)
- One Way Christian Church - Margate (3 January 2010)
- Pathway to Life - Devonport (8 February 1958)
- Redeemer Christian Church - Huonville (TBI)
- Riverbank Christian Church - Riverside (7 March 1954)
- Sanctuary Hill Christian Fellowship - Penguin (13 October 1951)
- Summerleas Christian Church - Huntingfield (3 January 2010)
- Christian Reformed Church of Ulverstone - Ulverstone (13 October 1951)

Victoria

- Reformed Church of Box Hill - Box Hill (19 May 1957)
- Casey Christian Reformed Church - Narre Warren South (1 July 1969)
- Christian Chinese Reformed Church - Springvale South (4 December 1989)
- Christian Reformed Church of Dandenong - Dandenong North (1 July 1953)
- Christian Reformed Church of Geelong - Geelong West (28 October 1955)
- Hope in the Hills Christian Church - Tecoma (17 July 1955)
- Christian Reformed Church of Langwarrin - Langwarrin (30 June 1968)
- Mount Evelyn Christian Reformed Church - Mount Evelyn (1 October 1953)
- Narre Warren Christian Church - Narre Warren (19 February 1989)
- One Hope Community Church - Scoresby (2 July 1995)
- Pakenham Christian Community Church (PC3) - Pakenham (24 July 2011)
- South Barwon Christian Reformed Church - Waurn Ponds (5 November 1989)
- Christian Reformed Church of South Gippsland - Leongatha (11 September 1957)
- Christian Reformed Church Wonga Park - Wonga Park (20 June 1980)

Western Australia

- Christian Reformed Church of Australind - Australind (17 September 1959)
- Forrestdale Gospel Community Church - Forrestdale (TBI)
- Gateway Community Church - Cockburn Central (4 May 2003)
- Christian Reformed Church of Gosnells - Gosnells (1 July 1974)
- Grace Christian Reformed Church - Joondalup (18 November 2007)
- Hope Community Church - Baldivis (30 July 2017)
- Wheatbelt Christian Fellowship - Wongan Hills (TBI)
- Willetton Christian Church - Willetton (23 September 1984)
- Wilson Christian Church - Wilson (7 February 2016)

== See also ==
- List of Presbyterian and Reformed denominations in Australia
