= Australian College of Christian Studies =

Australian vocational Bible college

The Australian College of Christian Studies (ACCS) is an Australian Bible college offering vocational under-graduate and post-graduate courses in ministry, theology, and Biblical counselling, in both English and Korean. It was formerly known as Tabor College Australia, and had merged with Emmaus Bible College.

Courses in ministry and theology are taught in Korean under the Sydney Korean Theological College that is accredited through the Sydney College of Divinity with ACCS. The main campus is in Sydney at Burwood, and co-located campuses are in Box Hill, Victoria and Brisbane, Queensland. A high proportion of the colleges students access courses online.
