= Christian education =

Christian education may refer to:

- Catechesis, a type of Christian education associated with the Roman Catholic church and churches that follow a liturgical paradigm
  - the Catholic Church's 1965 Declaration on Christian Education (Gravissimum educationis)
- Sunday school, the format for Christian education used widely among many different Christian denominations
- Bible study
- Seminary, for educating students in theology
- Parochial school, private school associated with a religious organization
- Christian school
- Christian college
- Classical Christian education
