= Perth Bible College =

Evangelical interdenominational Christian tertiary theological institution

- Former names: Perth Bible Institute
- Motto: "Thinking Service"
- Type: Tertiary theological institution
- Established: 2 July 1928
- Founders: Reverend Carment Urquhart
- Accreditation: TEQSA
- Academic affiliations: Sydney College of Divinity
- Principal: Reverend Stephen Poisat
- Academic staff: 7
- Total staff: 12
- Students: 80–100
- Location: 1 College Court, Karrinyup, Perth, Western Australia, 6018, Australia
- Colors: Navy, Teal, Aqua and Orange
- Website: pbc.wa.edu.au

Perth Bible College (abbreviated as PBC) is an evangelical interdenominational Christian tertiary theological institution, located in the Perth, suburb of Karrinyup, Western Australia.

Established in 1928 as the Perth Bible Institute, Perth Bible College has accreditation from the Australian Government's Tertiary Education Quality and Standards Agency as a Higher Education Provider for its degree and diploma programs. In 2019 PBC had the distinction of being ranked first in the Federal Government's QILT survey of all Higher Education Providers in Australia.

== Courses ==
Courses range from undergraduate to postgraduate degrees. Diploma of Counselling, Diploma, Bachelor and Graduate Diploma of Ministry courses are accredited through the Australian Government in the AQF whilst Bachelor and Master of Counselling courses, and the Master's degrees in Theological studies are accredited by the Sydney College of Divinity. PBC offers Counselling and Master's courses as a member institution of Sydney College of Divinity (Australian University College).

== See also ==
- List of Bible colleges
- List of seminaries and theological colleges in Australia
