= Australian University College of Divinity =

Australian University College of Divinity (formerly Sydney College of Divinity)
- Established: 1983
- Affiliations: Chongshin University and Theological Seminary (Korea); Soongsil University (Korea); Sungkyul University (Korea)
- Dean: Prof. Stephen Smith (Dean / CEO)
- Location: Sydney, New South Wales, Australia
- Campus: Metropolitan (multiple campuses)
- Website: scd.edu.au

The Australian University College of Divinity (AUCD), formerly Sydney College of Divinity, is a consortium of Christian theological educational institutions and Bible colleges based in Sydney, New South Wales, Australia. The college is structured as a federation of member institutions, each of which retains its autonomy and respective theological traditions. Member institutions represent a range of Christian churches.

AUCD is a registered Higher Education Provider, with degrees and awards accredited by the Australian Government Tertiary Education Quality and Standards Agency, a regulatory and quality agency for higher education. The consortium offers undergraduate awards that meet Australian and Korean education standards, postgraduate qualifications by coursework and research that meet Australian standards, and postgraduate qualifications by coursework that meet Korean standards. Awards range from Diploma in Theology to Doctor of Theology (Th.D.) and Doctor of Philosophy (Ph.D).

In Australia, seminaries which deliver instruction and prepare people for religious ordination are sometimes separate from theological educational institutions.

== Member institutions ==
- Australian College of Christian Studies
- Australian College of Ministries (ACOM)
- BBI The Australian Institute of Theological Education (BBI-TAITE)
- NAIITS An Indigenous Learning Community (NAIITS)
- Nazarene Theological College (NTC)
- Nisibis Assyrian Theological College
- New South Wales College of Clinical Pastoral Education (NSWCCPE])
- Olivet Theological Seminary
- Perth Bible College (PBC)
- Planetshakers College (PSC)
- Sparrows College
- St Andrew's Greek Orthodox Theological College
- St Cyril's Coptic Orthodox Theological College
