= Harvest Bible College =

Australian Pentecostal theological college

- Established: 1985
- President: Brendan Roach
- Location: Melbourne, Australia; 37.901°S 145.231°E
- Website: www.harvest.edu.au

Harvest Bible College was the first Pentecostal theological college accredited by the Australian government. In 2018 it merged with Alphacrucis College.

It was a private tertiary education provider, accredited by the Australian government, specialising in training for Christian ministry. It was non-denominational and Pentecostal in its theology and ethos.

== History ==
In 1985 there was no Pentecostal theological college in Victoria. In response to this, a British AOG pastor, Ps. Alun Davies, began Harvest Bible College on the property of the church he pastored. Initially, it ran as a non-government accredited college. With Dr Scott Wilson and then Dr Kameel Majdali as Principals, the College then became the first Pentecostal college in Australia to be accredited by the government, and the first to offer a Licentiate. At first, a Certificate IV in Ministry was accredited, then a Diploma in Ministry, then finally a Bachelor of Arts in Ministry or Biblical Studies.

After Dr Brendan Roach became Principal (2004) and then President (2011), the College accredited a Graduate Diploma in Theology, a Master of Arts in Ministry and a Doctorate of Ministry with the Australian government. The College also had campuses, in Queensland and Perth (Harvest West [Principal Ashley Crane] ), and abroad in Denmark, as well as smaller rural extension centres and online training. In 2014 the College moved its headquarters from the property of Faith Christian Church to its own building in Scoresby, Victoria.

Harvest consistently fulfilled its mission to Train Effective Ministry Worldwide to Serve Local Churches since 1985. For 33 years trained men and women to serve God in a variety of ministry roles and functions in and beyond the local church. Harvest trained 7,825 people and graduated 3,464 leaders for the kingdom of God. RTO 067 | CRICOS 01035C

Harvest Bible College merged with Alpha Crucis College in December 2018.

== Notable alumni ==
- Andrew Chan
