= Eastern College Australia =

- Established: 1988
- Principal: Rev Tim Meyers
- Location: Melbourne, Australia; 37.859742°S 145.208941°E
- Website: www.eastern.edu.au

Eastern College Australia is a non-denominational Christian Private Higher Education and Vocational Education provider in Melbourne, Australia.

The college offers courses including Education, Arts, Counselling and Theology degrees.

== History ==
Eastern College Australia, formerly named Tabor Victoria, was established in 1988 as a campus of Tabor College Adelaide. The founding principal was Dr Ian Richardson and the first classes were held at the Blackburn Baptist Church site on Holland Road Blackburn. Their current name was adopted in 2015.

James Catford then served as principal until his former wife, Dr Cheryl McCallum served as principal from 2012 to December 2017. Eastern College shared a campus with Stirling Theological College from January 2011 until December 2017. Both colleges offered separate educational awards and while students and staff freely mixed and formal study programs taught separately.

In 2017 Eastern moved to co-locate with MST, formerly Melbourne School of Theology in the Melbourne suburb of Wantirna.

== Schools ==
Eastern College Australia has three schools. The School of Arts and Social Sciences, School of Education and School of Theology.

== School of Arts and Social Sciences ==
The goal of the School of Arts and Social Sciences is to provide a broad, flexible education. It includes opportunities for students to develop broad philosophical and theoretical frameworks. It helps provide a base on which to develop task-specific skills and experience.outcomes.

Eastern College Australia has continued to develop its Counselling courses in response to community needs and changes in the counselling profession. Eastern started to offer counselling courses in 1987, with the most recent addition of a Graduate Diploma in Arts, specialising in counselling.

== School of Education ==
Eastern believes schools are places of change and development for children and young people. Christian teachers make significant impact on the lives of their students showing them something of the love and power of God, as well as helping them understand themselves, develop knowledge and skills and the capacities to live abundant and fruitful lives.

Eastern College Australia provides a Bachelor of Education - Primary or Secondary. As these courses are integrated with each other (Along with the Bachelor of Arts), students can transfer easily from one course to the other in the first two years of study. This provides great flexibility as they recognise that students' early goals can modify as their studies progress.

== School of Christian Studies ==
Eastern's Christian Studies courses provide in-depth understanding for handling Scripture and deepening spiritual life. All courses introduce students to studies of Scripture and Christian truth, an overview of history and ethics in the light of their history and social context and much more

Graduate-level degrees include: Master of Practical Theology and Master of Transformational Development.

== Resource Centre ==
The Resource Centre at Eastern College Australia contains over 85,000 items including: reference materials, books and audio-visual materials. In addition Eastern's Resource Centre contains over 55,000 journal issues. The library services faculty and students of Eastern College Australia and Melbourne School of Theology as well as members of the public who take out an individual membership.
