= Kingsley College Australia =

Methodist College in Australia

Kingsley College is the Bible College for the Wesleyan Methodist Church of Australia a school of theology located in Melbourne, Australia. Its student body is a mix of Wesleyan Methodists and students from other Christian denominations.

== History ==
The college was founded by President of the Australian Wesleyan Methodist Conference and editor of the Australian Wesleyan Kingsley Ridgway in 1948, and continues to welcome students from across Australia and the Pacific.

It was originally known as the Wesleyan Methodist Bible College of Australia; but in 1973 its name was changed to honour its founder upon his retirement. It was funded initially from donations made by Wesleyan Methodist church members in North America, reported by Ridgway as being "in the neighbourhood of one dollar (six shillings) per member over the whole connexion". Its first principal was professor Leo G. Cox, an American who was elected Conference President in 1948 after Ridgway.

Kingsley College continues to provide Wesleyan Methodist ministerial and lay person training in Bible and theology through the Vocational Education Training sector. Four awards in Christian Ministry are available. The college continues to thrive with a growing presence across Australia, into New Zealand, and students studying in the Pacific. Kingsley College delivers training under the auspices of Eva Burrows College, RTO 0328.

== Principals ==
Principals of Kingsley College
Name	Years of service
Dr Leo G. Cox	1949-1955
The Revd Robert Mattke	1956-1961
The Revd James Ridgway	1961-1966
The Revd Arthur Calhoun	1967-1969
The Revd Aubrey Carnell	1970-1971
The Revd Dr James Ridgway	1972-1984
The Revd Dr David Wilson	1985-2002
The Revd Lionel Rose	2003
The Revd Peter Dobson	2004-2010
The Revd Dr Kevin Brown	2010 – present

== Sources ==
- Emilsen, William; O'Brien, Glen (2016). "The Continuing Methods Legacy, 1977–2014". In O'Brien, Glen; Carey, Hilary M. (eds.). Methodism in Australia: A History. Routledge Methodist Studies Series. Routledge. ISBN 9781317097099.
- O'Brien, Glen (2018). Wesleyan-Holiness Churches in Australia: Hallelujah under the Southern Cross. Routledge Methodist Studies Series. Routledge. ISBN 9781351189217.
- Kostlevy, William (2010). "Ridggway, Kingsley Mervin". The A to Z of the Holiness Movement. Vol. 164. Rowman & Littlefield. ISBN 9780810875913.
- Dr Wynand J. de Kock, Principal Tabor Victoria; The Revd Peter J. Dobson, Principal Kingsley College. "Kingsley College and Tabor Victoria - United Press Release: Christian Colleges Unite with 100 years' experience" (Press release). Archived from the original on 19 July 2008.
- Patton, Don (2010). "A brief history of the Pacific College of Graduate Studies". Melbourne, Australia.
- Brown, Kevin (2026). "Kingsley College Handbook 2026".
