= Nazarene Theological College (Australia) =

Theological college in Queensland, Australia

- Nazarene Theological College Shield
- Former names: Nazarene Bible College (1953-1993)
- Type: Private theological college
- Established: 1953
- Affiliations: Church of the Nazarene
- Academic affiliations: Sydney College of Divinity
- Principal: Rev. Dr. Joseph Wood
- Location: Redland City, Queensland, Australia
- Campus: Suburban
- Website: ntc.edu.au

The Nazarene Theological College (NTC) is a theological college located in the Thornlands suburb of Redland City in Queensland, Australia. NTC is a member institution of the Sydney College of Divinity.

== History ==
In 1952, the General Council of the Nazarene Young People's Society voted to fund a bible college in Australia. Richard S. Taylor was appointed to be the founding principal of Nazarene Bible College and the Board was elected. A six-acre property in Thornleigh near Sydney was purchased for £17,000. Classes commenced in 1953 and the college was dedicated in 1953.

In 1973, the college relocated to Thornlands, Queensland rather than renovate at Thornleigh. 7.3 hectares (18 acres) were purchased on the southern outskirts of Brisbane for $13,000. During the next two years, nine buildings were constructed on the new campus but classes did not resume until 1976 under principal R.T. Bolerjack

In 1992 the college decided to seek accreditation of the three-year advanced diploma program from the Minister for Education in Queensland. In 1993, the college was renamed Nazarene Theological College "to better reflect its educational ethos." In 1994, the Queensland Minister for Education approved the accreditation of NTC's Advanced Diploma of Ministry program. The Bachelor of Ministry degree and a Graduate Diploma in Christian Studies were accredited in 2000.

In 2006, NTC became a member institution of the Sydney College of Divinity.

== Affiliations ==
Nazarene Theological College is operated by the Church of the Nazarene in Australia and New Zealand. During its 50 years, NTC has had students from Canada, Colombia, Hong Kong, India, Indonesia, Namibia, the Netherlands, Papua New Guinea, Samoa, South Africa, Taiwan, the United Kingdom and the United States of America, as well as from Australia and New Zealand. Students from other denominations have always been welcomed.

NTC is also a member institution of the Sydney College of Divinity and an institutional partner in the Australasian Centre for Wesleyan Research.

== Faculty ==
Richard Shelley Taylor (30 March 1912, Cornelius, Oregon – 19 June 2006) was a noted Nazarene educator and theologian. Taylor attended Northwest Nazarene College (now University) before receiving undergraduate degrees from Cascade College and George Fox, both in Oregon, in 1942 and 1944, respectively. He received a master's degree from PLNU (then Pasadena College) in 1945. He received his Doctor of Theology Degree in 1953 from the Boston University School of Theology. Taylor served in the roles of evangelist, pastor, and teacher in a long career of service in and to the Church. He was a retiree of the Education Department (now International Board of Education) at Nazarene Headquarters. In addition, Taylor was a writer. His works included the Disciplined Life; Exploring Christian Holiness, Vol. 3: The Theological Formulation; and A Right Conception of Sin.

=== Partial bibliography ===
- A Right Conception of Sin: Its Relation to Right Thinking and Right Living (1945)
- The Disciplined Life: Studies in the fine art of Christian discipline (1962)
- Life in the Spirit (1966)
- A Return to Christian Culture: Christian Ideals in a Sagging Society (1973)
- God, Man, & Salvation (1977) with W. T. Purkiser and Willard H. Taylor
- What Does It Mean to Be Filled with the Spirit? (1995)
- God's Integrity and the Cross (1999) ISBN 0-916035-81-6
- What Every Christian Ought to Know: Basic Answers to Questions of the Faith (2002)
