= Alphacrucis =

Ministry training college of Australian Christian Churches

Alphacrucis University College
- Former names: Commonwealth Bible College (1948–1993); Southern Cross College (1993–2009); Alphacrucis College (2009–2022)
- Motto: Equipping Christian leaders to change the world,
- Established: 1948 (as Commonwealth Bible College)
- Affiliations: Australian Christian Churches; Assemblies of God; Council for Christian Colleges and Universities
- President: Prof Stephen Fogarty
- Administrative staff: > 200
- Students: > 4,500
- Location: Parramatta, NSW, Australia; 33.820448°S 151.007138°E
- Campus: Multiple campuses – Adelaide, Auckland, Brisbane, Finland, Hobart, Melbourne, Perth, Sydney, Global Online
- Colours: Orange
- Website: ac.edu.au

Alphacrucis University College (AC, formerly Commonwealth Bible College and Southern Cross College) is a tertiary Christian liberal arts college. In addition to being the largest self-accrediting Christian liberal arts College in Australia, it is the official training college of Australian Christian Churches, the Assemblies of God in Australia. The college has campuses in every state capital city in Australia, campuses in Auckland and in Finland, and registered sites of offer in other places. Its main campus in Parramatta, New South Wales, Australia. The college has programmes running in various colleges and churches around Australia. The college was founded in 1948 with the vision of being a "spirit-empowered, church-planting, missions-sending, outreach-focused, distinctly Australian college that would contribute its efforts towards changing the world".

AC offers several courses in ministry, business, music, chaplaincy and counselling; accredited by the Australian Skills Quality Authority. It is also a self-accrediting higher education institution, that provides a range of theology, ministry, business, leadership, and education degrees up to doctorate level, baccalaureate and postgraduate programs in counselling, and a Korean language programme. The college ethos is based on an evangelical Pentecostal/Charismatic orientation. In 2018, the college had an Equivalent Full Time Student Load of over 1000.

== History ==
"Commonwealth Bible College" commenced in 1948 in Melbourne at the Richmond Temple under the Commonwealth Executive of the Assemblies of God in Australia. The college used the premises of Richmond Temple in the first year. The 40 students enrolled at CBC in 1948 called themselves the "Van Couriers 1948" or "First Messengers". They came to study from all over Australia.

In 1949, the college moved to Brisbane, first to New Farm, and, in 1961, to a purpose-built campus on the Brisbane River which was destroyed in the 1974 Brisbane flood.

After a year of temporary operation at Glad Tidings Tabernacle in Brisbane, 1949, a new campus was obtained and refurbished at Katoomba, New South Wales, in the former Palais Royale guesthouse. The facilities of the Illawarra Bible College were later added to the campus. The college remained at Katoomba until 1995. In 1993, the name was changed, first to "Southern Cross Bible College" and then to "Southern Cross College of the Assemblies of God in Australia Ltd" (not to be confused with Southern Cross University). From early 1996 to August 2011, the college was at Chester Hill, New South Wales. For a period during this time, the college was associated with the Sydney College of Divinity.

On 27 April 2009 at the Australian Christian Churches National Conference, Southern Cross College officially changed its name to Alphacrucis. The new name derives from the star that sits at the foot of the Southern Cross constellation named Alpha Crucis. The principal, Stephen Fogarty, said, "Alphacrucis is the brightest star in the Southern Cross, and it’s at the foot of the cross. […] We want our students to shine brightly at the foot of the cross."

In September 2011, AC relocated its main campus to 30 Cowper Street, Parramatta, Sydney (formally opening it in March 2012); and also re-opened its Brisbane campus at the site of iSEE CHURCH – 308 Seventeen Mile Rocks Road, Seventeen Mile Rocks, Brisbane. In early 2014, the AC Brisbane campus relocated to 35 Thompson Street, Bowen Hills, Brisbane, on the grounds of Hope Centre International. In 2016, it opened its own campus in Woolloongabba, to which it has since added campuses at Melville Street, Hobart, and in Melrose Park, Adelaide.

In December 2017, the other official ACC College, Harvest Bible College, merged with Alphacrucis.

== Faculty and research ==
Alphacrucis currently employs 180 staff in all. The college has set up the Australasian Pentecostal Heritage Centre, founded by Denise A. Austin, which includes the largest online repository of historical Pentecostal journals in the Southern Hemisphere – including issues of the Australian Evangel back to 1927. AC also has a refereed journal, Australasian Pentecostal Studies. As of 2018, the college library had over 100,000 volumes, and extensive electronic collections.

== See also ==
- Bible colleges affiliated with Australian Christian Churches
