= Wesleyan Methodist Church of Australia =

Australian Methodist Denomination

The Wesleyan Methodist Church of Australia is a Christian denomination with its origins in Wesleyan Methodism. It is the organisational name for contemporary The Wesleyan Church in Australia. (The historic Wesleyan Methodist denomination in Australia up to 1 January 1902 merged into the Methodist Church of Australasia.)

== Background and formation ==
The beginnings of the current Wesleyan Methodist Church in Australia may be traced to 1945, when the Rev. Dr. Kingsley Ridgway offered himself as a Melbourne-based "field representative" for a possible Australian branch of the Wesleyan Methodist Church of America, after meeting an American serviceman who was a member of that denomination.

Ridgway's legacy continued to be felt in the church, with his son, the Rev. Dr. James Ridgway, providing denominational and institutional leadership over many years, and grandson the Rev. Kent Ridgway serving as Southern District Superintendent.

Contrary to a popular assumption, it is not a "continuing Methodist Church", formed by those who did not join the merger in 1977 of Congregationalist, Methodist and Presbyterian congregations to form the Uniting Church in Australia. It was never a part of the merger negotiations with the bodies that formed the Uniting Church, though some members and ministers, unhappy with the Basis of Union of the Uniting Church, switched allegiance to the Wesleyan Methodist Church in Australia.

== Recent times ==
The Wesleyan Methodist Church of Australia saw increased growth in the 1980s, particularly in Queensland. As well as aiming at new convert growth, Wesleyan Methodists have welcomed into their membership those seeking an alternative to more liberal Protestant denominations, as well as Pentecostals looking for a church more grounded in historic Christianity. The 45th National Conference held in January 2004 reported 77 local churches, 96 ordained ministers, 2017 members and an average main Sunday service attendance of 3702 persons.

From the late 1990s, the Australian church has fostered and encouraged the emergence of Wesleyan Methodist churches in New Zealand, the Solomon Islands, and Bougainville, Papua New Guinea.

At the 2008 South Pacific Convention and National Conference held at Phillip Island, Victoria, a new National Superintendent was appointed, Lindsay Cameron, who brought to the position a desire to see the denomination strengthened through the upholding and proclamation of the uniqueness of Wesleyan doctrinal teaching.

There are 54 congregations currently listed on the denominational website.

== Theology ==
The church is theologically conservative and Arminian in theology. Congregations range from being traditional in their worship style to more charismatic. It appreciates both its revivalist and holiness heritage as well as its roots in John Wesley's Anglicanism. Along with Nazarenes and the Salvation Army, it has a strong commitment to the ordination of women, a position that in part arises out of its interpretive approach to the Bible and in part out of its revivalist heritage.

Historically, the church may be seen both as a new religious movement, emerging out of the post-war context of greater engagement between Australians and Americans and at the same time as a continuation of the long-standing Holiness and Revivalist strain within Australian evangelicalism.

The associated Kingsley College, Melbourne provides a ministry training program that offers four awards from Certificate IV to Graduate Certificate. Kingsley College delivers training under the auspices of Unity College Australia RTO 6330. Kingsley College has been the ministry training arm of the Wesleyan Methodist Church of Australia since 1949. That training of lay people and ministerial candidates continues through Kingsley Community training centres located around Australia.
