= Chant (disambiguation) =

A chant is the rhythmic speaking or singing of words or sounds.

Chant or Chants may also refer to:

== People with the name ==
- Barry Chant (born 1938), Australian author and co-founder of Tabor College Australia
- Christopher Chant, fictional nine-lived enchanter in the Chrestomanci series by Diana Wynne Jones
- Clarence Chant (1865–1956), Canadian astronomer and physicist
- Donald Chant (1928–2007), Canadian biologist
- Joy Chant (born 1945), British fantasy author
- Ken Chant (born 1933), Australian Pentecostal pastor
- Kerry Chant, Australian physician and public health officer
- Susie Chant, Canadian politician
- William Chant, Canadian politician

== Music ==
=== Groups ===
- The Chant, an American indie rock band
- Chants R&B, a rhythm and blues band from Christchurch, New Zealand

=== Albums ===
- Chant (Benedictine Monks of Santo Domingo de Silos album), 1994
- Chant (Donald Byrd album), 1979
- Chants (album), by Craig Taborn, 2012
- The Chant (album), by Sam Jones, 1961
- Chant, a 1985 album by Merzbow
- Chant: Music For Paradise, a 2008 album recorded in the Heiligenkreuz Abbey

=== Songs ===
- "Chant", by Fourplay from Between the Sheets, 1993
- "Chant", by Macklemore and Tones And I from Ben, 2023
- "Chant", song from Hadestown
- "Chant", by Jeff Majors

== Other uses ==
- Chant (crater), a lunar crater
- Chant (horse) (born 1891), American Thoroughbred racehorse that won the 1894 Kentucky Derby
- CHANT (ship type), a type of coastal tanker built in the UK during the Second World War
