= Christian Assemblies International =

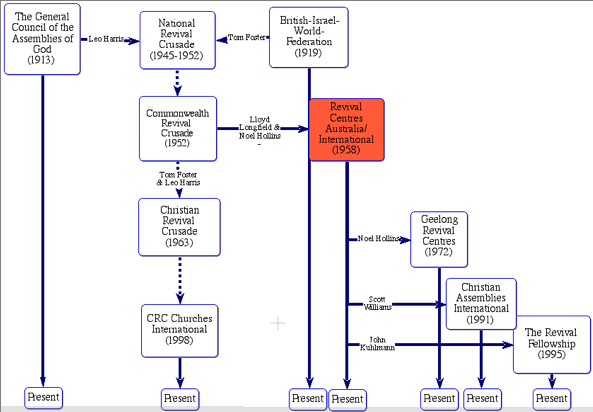
- Church Genealogy of Revival Centres International
- Classification: Registered Denomination
- Orientation: Pentecostal, Evangelical
- Polity: Autonomous
- Region: Austria, Australia, Canada, France, Germany, Greece, Italy, Netherlands, New Zealand, Poland, Russian Federation, South Africa, Sweden, Switzerland, United Kingdom, United States of America
- Founder: Scott Williams
- Origin: 1994; Coffs Harbour, Australia
- Separated from: Commonwealth Revival Crusade
- Branched from: Revival Centres of Australia
- Separations: Geelong Revival centre (1972) Christian Assemblies International (1991) New Delhi Revival Centres The Revival Fellowship (1995)
- Official website: http://www.cai.org/

Christian Assemblies International (CAI), rebranded as Christ in You Fellowship, is an Australian-based charity organisation and religious group registered as Christian Assemblies Europe International. CAI was registered as a charity in Australia in 1994, and operates in Australia and several other countries. The European headquarters in Stirling, Scotland is registered as the Scottish charity Christian Assemblies Europe.

The organisation started in the 1970s in Feldafing, Germany. According to Christian Assemblies International, they are a Pentecostal Church founded by Scott Williams. Williams began his career as a teacher at Ballarat East High School. In 2009, former members described the CAI as a cult. In 2014, former members also claimed the organisation is a cult in a four-year Australian Broadcasting Corporation investigation. According to CAI, the organisation was under new leadership before the death of Williams in 2015.

In September 2018 the group formally changed their leadership with two senior pastors being appointed to lead the church. A message to former members was recorded and shared in February 2019 admitting wrongdoing in the past and offering former members an opportunity to speak with the new leadership, and committing to making changes to the group's practices.

== See also ==
- Revival Centres International
- The Revival Fellowship
