= Vision International University =

University in the United States

Coordinates: 33.0388°N 116.8683°W

- Motto: "The Whole Word to the Whole World"
- Type: Private
- Established: 1990
- President: Stan E. DeKoven
- Faculty: approx. 30 (full and part time)
- Location: Ramona, California, United States
- Website: vision.edu

Vision International University is an American interdenominational Christian Seminary based in Ramona, California. The university offers distance education and online academic degree programs designed to prepare people for professional ministry.

The institution traces its roots to Vision International College (alternatively known as Vision Christian College) in Australia, which was founded in 1974 in Launceston, Tasmania, by Australian theologian and author Ken Chant. Together with Vision International College, City Vision University, and several other Christian educational institutions, Vision International University is a member institution of the Vision International Education Network.

== Academics ==
Vision International University offers ministry training and theological education to students from a wide variety of faith backgrounds. Vision International College began in Australia in 1974 as a Pentecostal-Charismatic institution without specific denominational affiliation. Vision cooperates with many Christian denominations and ministerial fellowships to provide a "primarily biblical education to both students preparing for vocational ministry and those who seek a stronger theological foundation for the ministerial context in which they find themselves". Vision welcomes students from any denominational background.

The curriculum of Vision attempts to maintain academic rigor from a non-dogmatic perspective, allowing students to study a wide variety of theological issues and to formulate their own beliefs in an academic context. Vision maintains a strong emphasis on church planting, community service, and Christian character development.

The university offers a bachelor's degree completion program and a small selection of focused master's and doctoral degree programs.

== Authorization and recognition ==
Since 1990, Vision International University has maintained authorization to grant degrees by religious exemption in the State of California. In 2005, the university submitted its application for state approval by the California Bureau for Private Postsecondary and Vocational Education (BPPVE) to be recognized as a degree-granting institution. In April 2007, the university received approval to operate from the BPPVE.

City Vision University has conducted an extensive evaluation of Vision International University courses and programs and will accept credit for courses as well as associate’s and bachelor’s degrees. Students with a Vision International University Bachelor’s Degree can enter directly into City Vision University Master’s programs.

Vision International University is accredited by Accreditation Service for International Schools, Colleges and Universities. ASIC is recognised by UKVI in UK, is a member of the CHEA International Quality Group (CIQG) in USA and is listed in their International Directory, is a member of the BQF (British Quality Foundation), and are institutional members of EDEN (European Distance and E-Learning Network.

== Accreditation in Australia ==
Vision International College in Australia is accredited by the New South Wales Vocational Education and Training Accreditation Board (VETAB), which is part of the Australian Qualifications Framework (AQF). This government accreditation is recognized throughout the British Commonwealth.

== Notable alumni ==
- Meadowlark Lemon, former member of the Harlem Globetrotters, holds a Doctor of Divinity degree.
- Shelley Lubben, former adult actress and later anti-porn activist, earned a bachelor's degree in theological studies.
- Guillermo Maldonado, founder of El Rey Jesus, holds a Doctor of Divinity degree.

== See also ==
- TechMission
- Vision International College
