= Revival Centres International =

Pentecostal church headquartered in Australia

- RCI Logo
- Classification: Registered Denomination
- Orientation: Pentecostal
- Polity: Autonomous
- Region: Australia, Canada, Democratic Republic of Congo, England, Fiji, Italy, Kenya, Liberia, Malawi, Mozambique, New Zealand, Papua New Guinea, Poland, Rwanda, Solomon Islands, South Africa, Tanzania, Uganda, United Kingdom, USA, Zimbabwe
- Founder: Lloyd Longfield
- Origin: 1958; Melbourne, Aust
- Separated from: Commonwealth Revival Crusade
- Separations: Geelong Revival centre (1972) Christian Assemblies International (1991) The Revival Fellowship (1995)
- Congregations: 1000+
- Members: 2000+ (plus tens of thousands in Africa and PNG)
- Ministers: 1000+
- Other names: Revival Centres of Australia (superseded); Revival Centres Church
- Key Pastors= Lloyd Longfield (founder), Simon Longfield, (Principal Pastor). Church Homepage = Church Slogans = "Contending for the faith", "The Truth with Proof", "Filled with the Spirit of God"

The Revival Centres International (Revival Centres Church) is a Pentecostal church with its headquarters in Melbourne, Australia. In 2015 the Revival Centres International changed their name to Revival Centres Church.

The Revival Centres was established as a result of schism from the Commonwealth Revival Crusade in 1958.

The Revival Centres emphasizes the belief that "speaking in tongues" is essential to demonstrating one has received the Holy Spirit, and is therefore a saved Christian. This doctrinal position separates them from every major Pentecostal denomination with the exception of the United Pentecostal Church, which also bases its teaching on an idiosyncratic interpretation of Acts 2. The Revival Centres does not engage or affiliate with any other religious organisation.

== Doctrine and Beliefs ==
The core belief of the Revival Centres Church is that speaking in tongues is the evidence of a person having received the Holy Spirit. The church also believes that God heals, and that converts can expect ongoing life changing transformations.

The Revival Centres Church's statement of beliefs is:

- Infallibility of the Word of God
- Jesus Christ is the Son of God
- The Gospel of His death, resurrection, and the directive to repent, be baptised, and receive the Holy Spirit
- Baptism into the Body of Christ (the Church) through the Holy Spirit, with the Bible evidence of speaking in tongues
- Miraculous gifts of the Holy Spirit in the Church
- Prayer for the sick and healing by the power of God
- The Bible instructs the Spirit-filled believer on how to live an overcomer’s life
- The Bible describes God’s plan for this world and gives signs of the soon return of Jesus Christ

== Demographics ==
The Revival Centres claims over 1000 assemblies in 20 countries. According to 2021 census data, 735 Australians identified as members of the Revival Centres in that year. At the census undertaken twenty years earlier, the figure was 3,856

== Church genealogy ==
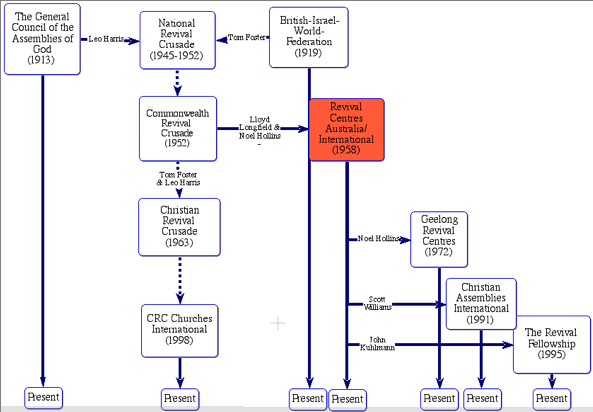
Church Genealogy of Revival Centres International

=== Early schisms ===
The predecessor of the Revival Centres was the Commonwealth Revival Crusade, which began as the National Revival Crusade in 1945. The Crusade was itself the result of schism with the Assembly of God over the issue of the so-called British-Israel identity. In 1952 Lloyd Longfield deposed pastor Tom Foster to assume control of the Melbourne assembly, ostensibly over the latter's deliverance ministry. This resulted in the Melbourne work being divided, with Foster and Longfield leading competing Crusade assemblies. The Revival Centres of Australia (as they were then known) was established in 1958 by Noel Hollins and Lloyd Longfield, when the pair withdrew from the Crusade after refusing to ratify the proposed national constitution. They experienced schism again in 1972 when the founders disfellowshipped each other, thereby dividing the work into two factions. Lloyd Longfield's group remained the 'Revival Centres of Australia' while Noel Hollins' group became the 'Geelong Revival Centres' and affiliated assemblies.

== Carn Brae ==
One of the earliest Revival Centre purchases was in March 1966 when the Revival Centres paid almost $100,000 for a property in Harcourt Street, Auburn in Melbourne to develop as a church meeting place. The land included a large seventeen-roomed mansion formerly the residence of the Lord Mayor of Melbourne, known as Carn Brae. Nearby residents feared the building of a hall on the property would spoil the previously quiet character of the area, and their protests made newspaper headlines in Victoria and interstate. Permission to build a hall on the property was ultimately denied. Lloyd Longfield lived in the property for several years, and used the property for various church related functions.

== Forum Theatre ==
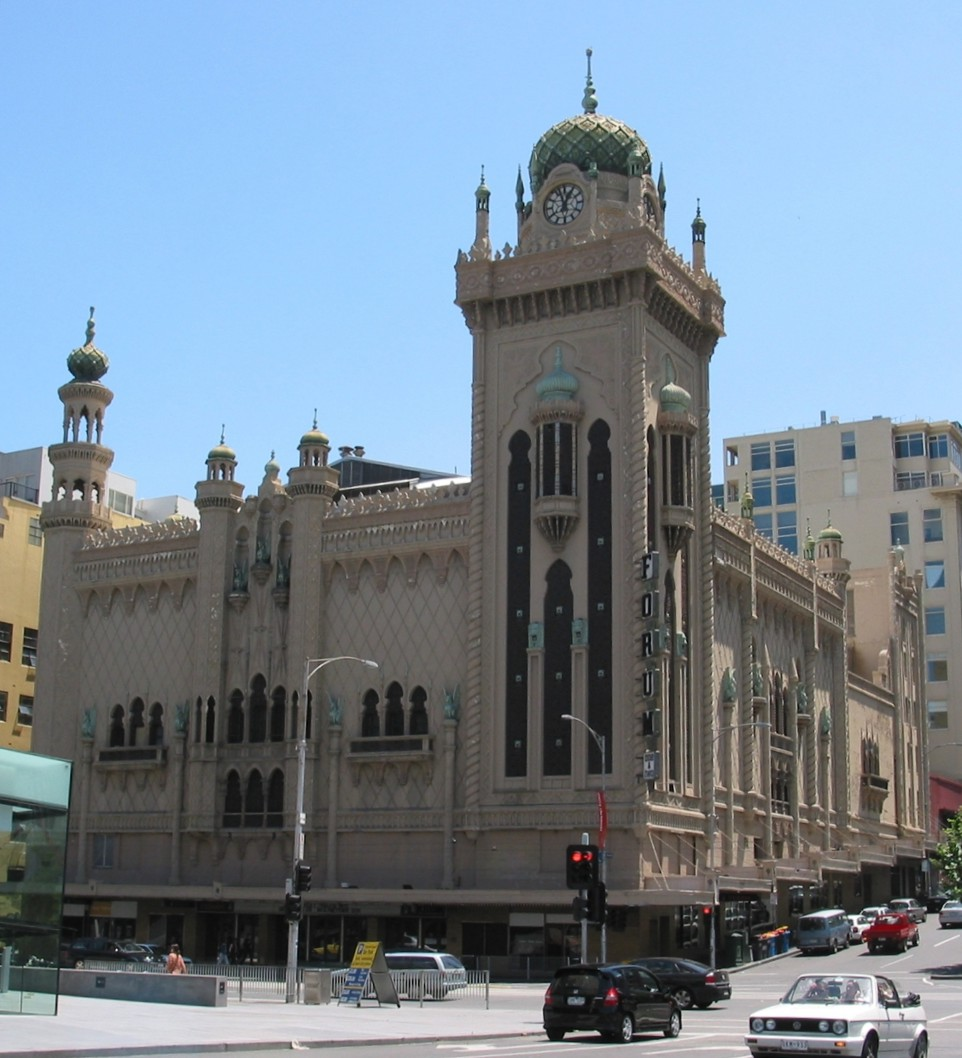
The famous "Moorish Revival" style building and previous location of Revival Centres International HQ

The Forum Theatre (formerly known as the "State Theatre") is a famous "Moorish Revival" style theatre located on the corner of Flinders Street and Russell Street in the central business district of Melbourne, Australia. When the theatre was first built by Bohringer, Taylor & Johnson in 1929, it had the largest seating capacity in Australia, holding 3371 people. In 1985 it was purchased by the Revival Centres International for use as its International headquarters. In 1995 the property was sold to Staged Developments Australia, who redeveloped it for use as a film and concert venue.

== General meeting format ==
The Revival Centres normally holds a midweek meeting in the form of decentralised house groups, and at least one full assembly meeting each Sunday, generally two. Both meeting types are expected to contain most of the following elements:

- Community singing or "choruses" led by a song leader.
- Welcome and opening prayer.
- Personal Testimonies, given by church members.
- Sermon or "talk" given by a pastor or a male leader. Women are not permitted to become pastors, nor are they permitted to preach from the platform.
- Sharing of the Communion "elements" (bread and grape juice) representing body and blood of Christ. Normally once a week at the Sunday meeting.
- Operation of the Spirituals Gifts or "Voice Gifts" by church members. i.e. containing speaking in tongues, interpretation of that tongue and prophecy.
- Prayer line or "laying on of hands" for people with needs, by church leaders.
- Donations or "tithing".
- Church Activities Announcements.
- Closing prayer.
- Social time after meeting.

== Spiritual gatherings and practices ==
A common practice for Revival Centres members is to gather together each year at various camp venues during Christmas and Easter holidays as a Spiritual Retreat. Each year the Melbourne assembly hosts an international convention during the Australian King's Birthday weekend. Some countries and areas hold annual local rallies throughout the year. Revival Centres members are voluntarily active in evangelising or "outreaching", individually or in groups. Various assemblies run activities for a Young Revivalists group (generally in the 10 to 14 years age group); the Young People group (generally 15 to 21 years age group), and the Revival Rangers group (5 to 10 years age group).

== Missions ==
Revival Centres International emphasis is on equipping local people to run their own assemblies. They have no standing missionaries, preferring to train and encourage the locals, thereby avoiding paternalism. They strongly support and encourage members in the "mission fields" through regular visits, and where financially possible, by bringing groups to the annual convention in Australia each year. Visits are made by pastors and officers as part of an ongoing program of support, but also by groups of assembly members and young peoples groups.

== British Israelism and statements on racism ==
Royal coat of arms of the United Kingdom. Dieu et mon droit — "God and my right", Honi soit qui mal y pense — "Shamed be he who thinks ill of it"

The Revival Centres International statement about British Israelism is that it draws together biblical and historical clues identifying The Anglo Saxon Celtic peoples as the Lost Tribes of Israel, and that countries comprising majority Anglo Saxon Celtic peoples are therefore inheritors of God's promises to the Old Testament nation of Israel. They believe God's intention for Israel was that they would be a blessing to all the families (nations, ethnic groupings etc.) of the earth, not that they would form some kind of master race. Some of these "British Israel" identifying features include linking emblems of modern-day nations to Israel emblems from the Bible, such as the UK Royal coat of arms and the seal of the president of the United States. The identifications also includes links of the mottos of the emblems to biblical descriptions.

The Revival Centres believes all human beings have been created in the image of God; they have equal value in God's sight, and that salvation is open to all. They note they have members from all major ethnic groups and that church members share fellowship with members from all ethnic groups and intermarry.

The British Israel theory of racial and national identity has been discredited on biblical, historical, ethnological, genetic, philological, linguistic and archaeological grounds, but it remains an important point of belief for the Revival Centres International. Critically, the British Israel message was racially and nationally motivated from its invention in the 18th century, and consolidation in the 1850s. It provided a justification for the colonial expansion of the British Empire, and was promoted in earnest within the Church of England after the Second World War to bolster the belief that Great Britain and her dominions were favored by God, in spite of the rapidly declining influence of said Empire.

Seal of the president of the United States: "E pluribus unum" -out of many, one.

== Second Coming ==
The Revival Centres believes and adheres to an interpretation of Jesus' prophecies about his soon return. During the 1980s the Revival Centres taught Armageddon and Jesus's return were imminent – holding events such as the "Survival '82" outreach. In the June/July 1984 issue of the Voice of Revival Magazine, Lloyd Longfield wrote an editorial claiming that Jesus Christ would return to earth no later than 17 September 2001. Simon Longfield publicly acknowledged this error: "We need to keep a faith focus in our ministry and take care not to make unbiblical claims or statements. There was a time in the early ‘80s where the careful editorial scrutiny of Voice of Revival was lost for a time and some unwise things were published. One of these ‘chickens has come home to roost’. It was claimed that the Lord would return at a specific date and time. This has appeared on the Internet to our detriment."

In a Melbourne Revival Centre book, entitled The Throne of David and the Return of Christ, at the end of chapter nine it says "the generation of people who were alive in 1917 would still be alive when all the prophecies concerning the return of Jesus Christ reach fulfillment." The chapter acknowledges that while "1917 Generation" is not a Bible term, it later speculates in the same chapter that a "generation" scripturally implies that it is forty years. This chapter explains that it lines up with the prophesied signs of the return of Christ examined in the chapter seven as being fulfilled by 1957. Therefore, Revival Centres International teaches the imminent return of Jesus Christ based on the precept that the prophesied signs of his return have been fulfilled.

The Stone of Scone is believed to be the Stone of Destiny, and the pillow stone of Jacob used for the coronation of many kings. The Revival Centres speculates that when Jesus returns he will be crowned on this coronation stone due to its biblical history. However, the stone of Scone has been proven geologically to comprise red sandstone from the local Perthshire region, having Strathclyde substrates. It is of a completely different type to the karst sandstones found in Palestine and the Negev, and so cannot be the stone used as a pillow by the patriarch Jacob.

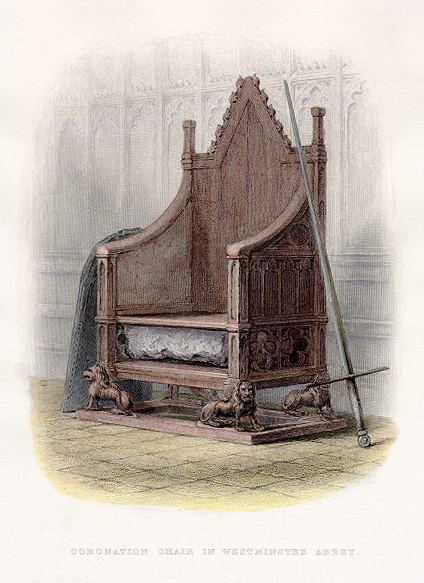
The Stone of Scone in the Coronation Chair at Westminster Abbey, 1885.

== Publications ==
While the Revival Centres International acknowledges certain books as being useful for bible study, they have published a number of books themselves including "The Sabbath", "Jacob vs Esau", "The Commonwealth of Israel" and "The Throne of David and the Return of Christ". They also publish articles such as "An Introduction to the Emblems of Israel", "The Emblems of Israel" and "Wisdom from the Preaching of the Word of God".

For many years the Revival Centres published a magazine called "Voice of Revival", that gave insight into their doctrine and their life, but about which they made no claims regarding infallibility

From the 1980s the Revival Centres published a foolscap report called 'SITREP' (from the military, Situation Report), used to report on activities in their assemblies around the world. In 1991, following encouragement from Lloyd Longfield, this became a magazine that was issued four times a year. In 1994 the magazine developed into the twice yearly "Newsletter", which included colour photos. In 2006, the "Newsletter" was replaced by the church's online news section on their official website front page. The online news articles are contributed by various Revival Centres International editors from around the world.

A monthly email newsletter can be freely subscribed to from their official website as well as free podcasts of talks and free mp3 download of one of their music albums.

== Doctrinal schisms and refining church identity ==
In 1991 a number of assemblies in Europe broke with the Revival Centres and formed the Christian Assemblies International under Scott Williams. A further schism occurred in 1995 when approximately half of the Australian assemblies, and a majority of the PNG assemblies aligned with the Adelaide assembly to organize The Revival Fellowship. They cited as grounds their disagreement over Lloyd Longfield's revision of the fornication policy (i.e. church members who engaged with sex outside of marriage would no longer be able to attend Revival Centres International in perpetuity.)

Revival Centres International, former owner of the Forum Theatre in the city, bought the Campion Books premises in Middleborough Rd, Box Hill South and moved in at the end of April 1998. In 1998, Lloyd Longfield handed leadership to his son, Simon Longfield, who continues to lead the group.

After a combination of doctrinal schisms and changes in leadership, several revisions were made to refine Revival Centres International's spiritual direction and church identify.

Lloyd Longfield's (d. 29 March 2012) legacy includes six major schisms and church splits between 1952 and 1995.

=== Bible Numerics ===
In June 1999 the Revival Centres International revised its position on Bible Numerics after becoming aware it could be conclusively disproven mathematically. They had previously considered Bible Numerics, as pioneered by Ivan Panin, to be conclusive proof for the divine authorship of the Bible and had promoted this error for many years.

Current Revival Centre thought is that these supposed intricate numerical patterns are in fact a feature of any text, in any language. Outlined in a paper written by Geoff Beggs dated 9 February 1999, this position was formed following study and consideration of work done by a mathematician named Brendon MacKay. The original work and associated computer program was developed by Brendon MacKay working at the Australian National University of Canberra and was used to analyze Bible Numerics.

=== Revision of the Code of Conduct ===
Lloyd Longfield originally developed the "RCI Code of Conduct", known colloquially as the "Rules and Regs", on becoming concerned at a church meeting, that a young man had attended with his new girlfriend while his girlfriend of the previous week sat at the back of the church, crying. Longfield devised the code of conduct, which mentioned conduct which the church regarded as unacceptable.

Primarily focused towards the youth of the church, the code of conduct dealt with a wide range of guidelines for "living a righteous life" covering areas of acceptable behavior and activities to relationships and appearances. For every topic, there was a biblical quotation and a number of propositions which follow from that text. Its introduction stated "...these requirements are mandatory for the safety of us all. As the worldly influences continue to grow we must become more direct in our campaign to keep unsavoury practices out of the Church – the body of Christ!"

Members failing to comply with these guidelines would be dealt with by the local pastor resulting through counseling, education, restrictions/conditions in participation in church ran activities, and temporary or permanent dismissal from the church, depending on the severity of the situation.

Longfield stated the code did not assert the guidelines were based on a specific command in the Bible. He said that the code contained suggestions, observations or regulations to help people apply the Scriptures in their everyday lives and in the context of a changing world. The code was devised by the leadership of the Church to help to contribute to the well-being of its members. The code of conduct was revised each year or as different situations arose. The code was then distributed throughout RCI.

After the 1995 schism, and the subsequent change of leadership from Lloyd Longfield to Simon Longfield in 1998, the Revival Centres further revised the Code of Conduct. It was found that most of the rules and regulations were based on moral dilemmas concerning fornication and other behavioral problems the people of the church faced. It was concluded that many of the rules and regulations failed to stress the importance of personal responsibility, and in practice had problems de-emphasizing many other individual/external influence on each set of circumstances that church members faced.

The intention of the Code was to address broader areas of concerns that church members, especially young people, would find the most pressure, misleading information or harm to their spiritual walk. The onus now focuses on each church member " . . . working out your own salvation with fear and trembling." This means in practice that each church member is encouraged to accept the guidance of scripture in these matters.

The natural result of this revision means there is more allowance for church members to take even greater personal responsibility for their spiritual growth, and less personal intervention by the church oversight unless it was absolutely necessary or there was an urgent concern raised. Therefore, the "Code of Conduct" was withdrawn in preference to the church's simplified stance against fornication. This resulted in a moving away from the oversight being seen as a type of confessional outlet, and being more of a "shepherd" or "guide".

== Criticism ==
Criticism of the Revival Centres International tends to focus on two broad areas: the substance of their teaching, and the way they have treated former members. In mid-April 1998, weeks prior to the church moving in the Campion Books premises in Middleborough Rd, Box Hill South from the Forum Theatre, a number of former members spoke out via the Whitehorse Gazette, in a bid to warn Whitehorse residents of the organisation's impending move to the area in order to raise community awareness about the group. The Whitehorse Gazette also covered their founder, Lloyd Longfield's response in dismissing such concerns.

A notable scandal occurred in 2009, when Gold Coast pastor and solicitor Glenn Duker was exposed for running a Ponzi scheme that resulted in Revival Centres members and others losing $60 million in funds. Several of the aggrieved members claimed they received no support from their pastors, with some stating they had been disfellowshipped for speaking out. The scandal made headlines in Australia, and across the world.

Concerns have been raised about the use of guilt, fear, shame, financial predation and mind control, and of church activities occupying members time to the extent they had little opportunity to spend time with family members outside of the group. Other concerns raised by current and former members included that group members are unable to criticize or question the leaders in any way for fear of being disfellowshipped, nor are they allowed to associate with people who attend other churches. Similar concerns were highlighted by Australian journalist Tom Tilley, whose father Andrew was a Revival Centres pastor, in a 2022 memoir he wrote concerning his upbringing in the Revival Centres. The book was published under the title, “Speaking in Tongues” Lloyd Longfield claimed the Revival Centres International did not believe it was the only true Church, but it did believe its teachings were the only true way. He dismissed outright suggestions the group was a cult, or that it controlled and dominated its members. "You come along and have a wonderful experience in the Lord", he said. "You are born again and from that time on you walk, carefully and more reasonably. Every religious group is a cult. I suppose they say these things because they think we're out of line."

Longfield simplistically maintained those who left did so because they could not follow the Bible. He denied members were told to ignore them. "Some people leave because the group doesn't suit them. They cut themselves off 90 per cent of the time", he said. "It's not that no one can speak to them, they're just not in fellowship any more. They have different interests and we don't see them any more." Longfield said Church members were welcome to discuss concerns with the leaders but those who left the Church chose not to.

Lloyd Longfield defended the Church's actions of "disfellowshipping" members for breaking the rules. He said in other churches people who disobeyed the Bible were given a "smack on the wrist" and were allowed to keep attending services. "The church as a rehabilitation centre is ridiculous", Longfield said. Notably, Lloyd Longfield also claimed that he did not sin.

The status of the Revival Centres as a Christian church has been frequently challenged. According to critics their belief system elevates personal experience over biblical teaching, and as such is open to significant error through untethered subjectivity. Many have challenged the Revival Centres' interpretations of Scripture, claiming the group dismisses important historical, cultural and linguistic factors necessary to understanding Bible passages in their proper contexts. As Revival Centres pastors and leaders do not receive any tertiary training in biblical and theological studies, they lack the technical skills needed to properly understand, interpret and apply biblical teaching.

Further, critics point out there is no record of anything approaching the core doctrines of the Revival Centres International anywhere in the Christian Church from the early second until the early twentieth centuries.

== See also ==
- Pre-Adamite
- Ten Lost Tribes
