= Guillermo Maldonado =

Guillermo Maldonado may refer to:

- Guillermo Maldonado (pastor), founder of El Rey Jesús
- Guillermo Maldonado (racing driver), Argentine racing driver
