= WOIR =

Radio station in Homestead, Florida

- Homestead, Florida; United States
- Broadcast area: Miami area
- Frequency: 1430 kHz

Programming
- Format: Spanish Contemporary Christian

Ownership
- Owner: ERJ Media, LLC
- Operator: Iglesia Pentecostal Víspera del Fin (sale pending)

History
- First air date: November 2, 1957
- Former call signs: WSDB (1957–1963); WIII (1963–1972); WRSD (1972–1974); WQDI (1974–1985); WRBA (1985–1987)

Technical information
- Licensing authority: FCC
- Facility ID: 13776
- Class: B
- Power: 5,000 watts day 500 watts night
- Transmitter coordinates: 25°27′09″N 80°30′59″W

Links
- Public license information: Public file; LMS
- Website: lacadenadelafamilia.com

WOIR (1430 AM) is a radio station broadcasting a Spanish-language Christian format licensed to Homestead, Florida, United States, and serving South Florida. The station is currently owned by ERJ Media, LLC, a subsidiary of the El Rey Jesús church in Miami, and programmed by the Iglesia Pentecostal Víspera del Fin.

== History ==
=== Early years ===
On May 29, 1957—nearly two years after the filing was made—South Dade Broadcasting Co. was granted a construction permit to build a new radio station to serve Homestead on 1430 kHz, with 500 watts during daytime hours only. The station went on the air November 2 of that year, becoming the first broadcasting outlet in southern Dade County. In 1962, Seven League Productions purchased WSDB; the transaction closed in January 1963, and the call sign was changed to WIII that April. Seven League, however, struggled financially. In 1964, two groups sought the license for themselves: one, another group known as South Dade Broadcasting Company, ended up purchasing Seven League in 1966, beating out Redlands Broadcasting, a group that included a former mayor of Homestead.

In 1972, Clement Littauer purchased control of WIII. Littauer had owned two radio stations in San Juan, Puerto Rico, and had started the only English-language TV station there. The call letters changed to WRSD on June 1 of that year, changing to a middle-of-the-road format. Two years later, WRSD became WQDI when Southland Radio, Inc., acquired it; Southland flipped WQDI to country, the only format it ran at its stations. During Southland ownership, the daytime-only station was approved in 1978 to begin nighttime service, which was activated in 1980.

Southland Radio sold WQDI to Miami physician Ramiro Marrero in 1984 for $1.265 million; the station changed call signs to WRBA on September 15, 1985. However, WRBA's operational existence would prove short-lived. On the evening of August 15, 1986, the station informed its listeners it was going off air to perform construction work at its office; no such construction ever materialized, and the same day, the owners had filed for bankruptcy.

=== Radio Continental ===
WRBA was bought out of its silence by the Continental Broadcasting Corporation in 1987 and emerged as a Spanish-language station, WOIR "Radio Continental". The station's primary audience consisted of listeners of Mexican and Central and South American origin. In 1991, Carlos and Angela López reached a deal to buy WOIR, making it the first Miami-area station to be owned by Colombian Americans.

During Hurricane Andrew, Radio Continental was credited with saving the lives of hundreds of farmworkers in a labor camp. General manager Armando Gallegos remained on the air from the afternoon until midnight, pleading for listeners to evacuate; there were no deaths or injuries. The hurricane toppled both of the station's towers; after the storm, the engineer improvised a new antenna using a tree, and with aid from the city of Homestead and the Department of Defense, the station was back on air.

=== Christian radio ===
In 1995, Continental Broadcasting sold WOIR to Corpo-Mex, Inc. The format continued, but the presence of religious programming on the frequency, branded as Radio Amanecer, increased, dominating by 1999. In 2001, Amanecer Christian Network, Inc., purchased WOIR from Corpo-Mex for $2.58 million.

Amanecer Christian Network went into receivership in 2008, and a new investment company replaced it as the licensee; one of the two major debtors was Corpo-Mex, which had sold the station to Amanecer Christian Network in 2001.

ERJ Media filed to sell the station for $900,000 to Iglesia Pentecostal Víspera del Fin of Seattle, which airs Spanish-language Christian programming under the name Tu Familia Radio on stations on the West Coast, in December 2022. The church then assumed programming responsibilities for WOIR on December 16, 2022.
