= Revival Fellowship =

Pentecostal denomination

The Revival Fellowship is a Pentecostal church that was founded in Australia in 1995, following a schism from the Revival Centres International. It claims approximately 45 assemblies in Australia, and several developed and developing nations across the world. The international assemblies are small in number, with five to six groups of fewer than thirty people in most western nations, to perhaps a few thousand people in total in sub-Saharan Africa and Asia. Their largest assemblies are in Papua New Guinea, claiming between 100,000 to 200,000 members in that country. According to Australian Bureau of Statistics census data 1,114 people identified with the Revival Fellowship in 2021.

The Revival Fellowship is led by an unelected Council of experienced Pastors from around the world.

== History ==
Revival Fellowship
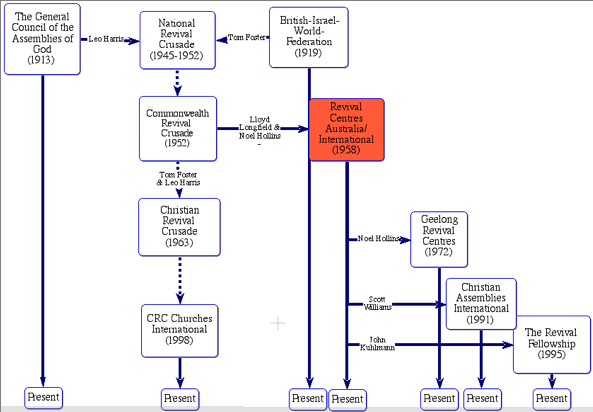
- Church Genealogy of Revival Centres International

The Revival Fellowship was formed as a result of a 1995 schism with the Revival Centres International. At a Christmas church camp in 1994 Lloyd Longfield (head-pastor of the Revival Centres International) instituted a policy that sexually immoral members would be permanently excommunicated; that they could never be restored to fellowship. The Adelaide assembly, led by pastor John Kuhlmann, opposed the move, withdrawing from the Revival Centres with approximately half of the assemblies (30), a third of pastors (35) and potentially over half of the membership (3,300 including 120 from Melbourne - the bulk of membership outside of Victoria and Tasmania). Approximately half of the missions work in Papua New Guinea became part of the Revival Fellowship, as well as various other international assemblies (including assemblies in Europe, Africa, New Zealand, the Pacific and the Americas).

== Doctrine ==
=== Salvation ===
The Revival Fellowship teaches that a person is not saved unless they have repented, been baptised by complete immersion in water, and received the Holy Spirit with the evidence of speaking in tongues. This view is not shared by any other major Christian group, and the only significant Pentecostal group that does is the United Pentecostal Church, who also defend their belief with an interpretation of Acts 2:38.

Scriptures quoted by the Revival Fellowship to justify its position on salvation include Acts of the Apostles|Acts chapter 2 (particularly the first few verses, which records the apostles speaking in tongues on the day of Pentecost, and Acts 2:38, which is included in the group's logo), Mark 16:15-20, Acts 10:44-48, Acts 19:1-6 and John 3:1-21 (particularly verses 1–9). Revival Fellowship teaching on speaking in tongues emphasizes glossolalia (which is an unintelligible, linguistically defined non-language; e.g. Acts 10:46, 1 Cor 14:2) over and against xenoglossa (which is a linguistically defined language; e.g. Acts 2:8).

Significant challenges have been levied against these Revival Fellowship doctrines by critics who are theologians with appropriate training in the science of biblical interpretation, or exegesis. They challenge what they believe is an uncritical and subjective approach to the interpretation of key Bible passages within the Revival Fellowship.

=== Miracles ===
The Revival Fellowship believe in miracles from God, and many claim to have experienced miraculous healings. Testimonies, consisting largely of stories about receiving the Holy Spirit and claims of healings and miracles, are often shared in fellowship meetings and publications.

The Revival Fellowship has representation in various Third World countries, including Papua New Guinea, where there are unverified claims of its members being healed of HIV/AIDS and being raised from the dead.

=== Bible Prophecy and Other Topics ===
The Revival Fellowship preaches a form of historicist interpretation of Bible prophecy, and holds to the ahistoric mid-twentieth century British-Israel religious theory as a crucial means of interpreting Bible prophecy, while denying its fundamentally racist elements.

The British Israel theory of racial and national identity has been discredited on biblical, historical, ethnological, philological, linguistic and archaeological grounds, but it remains an important point of belief for the Revival Fellowship. Critically, the British Israel message was racially motivated from its invention in the 18th century, and consolidation in the 1850s. It provided a justification for the colonial expansion of the British Empire, and was promoted in earnest within the Church of England after the Second World War to bolster the belief that Great Britain and her dominions were favored by God, in spite of the rapidly declining influence of said Empire.

== Criticism ==
Criticism of the Revival Fellowship tends to focus on two broad areas: the substance of their teaching, and the way they have treated former members.

Several novel beliefs shunned by historians, mathematicians and Christian theologians alike, including Bible Numerics, British Israel and Pyramidology are uncritically accepted and taught in the Revival Fellowship.

Concerns have been raised about the use of guilt, fear, shame, financial predation and mind control, and of church activities occupying members time to the extent they had little opportunity to spend time with family members outside of the group. Other concerns raised by current and former members included that group members are unable to criticize or question the leaders in any way for fear of being disfellowshipped, nor are they allowed to associate with people who attend other churches. From 2025 onwards the Revival Fellowship's Council of Pastors has taken steps to actively prevent dictatorial and controlling leadership styles, including the dismissal of pastors who refused to change their approach.

The status of the Revival Fellowship as a Christian church has been frequently challenged. According to critics their belief system elevates personal experience over biblical teaching, and as such is open to significant error through untethered subjectivity. Many have challenged the Revival Fellowship's interpretations of Scripture, claiming the group dismisses important historical, cultural and linguistic factors necessary to understanding Bible passages in their proper contexts. As Revival Fellowship pastors and leaders do not receive any tertiary training in biblical and theological studies, they lack the technical skills needed to properly understand, interpret and apply biblical teaching.

Further, critics point out there is no record of anything approaching the core doctrines of the Revival Fellowship anywhere in the Christian Church from the early second until the early twentieth centuries. The Revival Fellowship defends their stance by claiming that they are merely returning to the beliefs of the early church, which they believe were lost or corrupted.

== See also ==
- Christian Assemblies International
- Revival Centres International
