= CRC Churches International =

International network of Finished Work Pentecostal churches

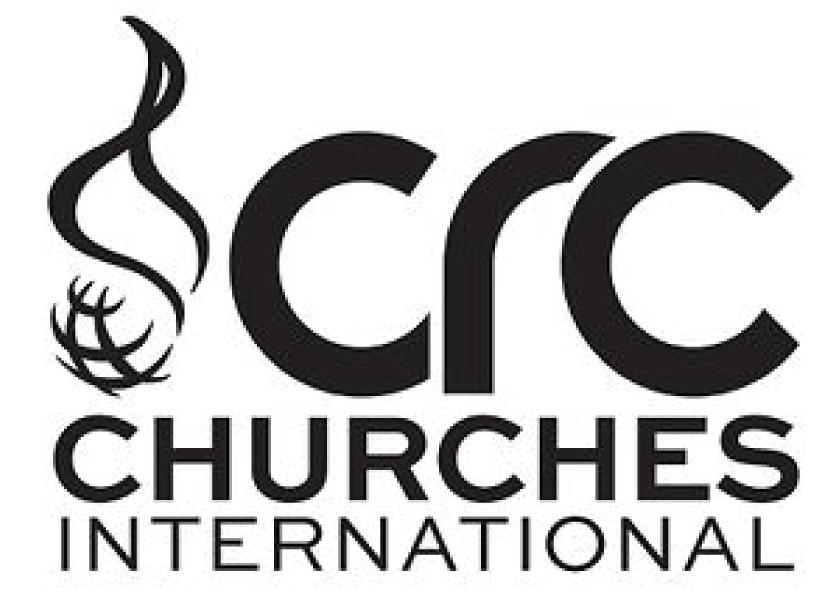
- Classification: Protestant
- Orientation: Finished Work Pentecostalism, Evangelical
- Founder: Leo Harris with assistance from Thomas Foster
- Origin: 1944 NZ, 1945 Australia
- Official website: http://www.crcchurches.org/

Development of the CRC Churches International in Australia (click to enlarge)

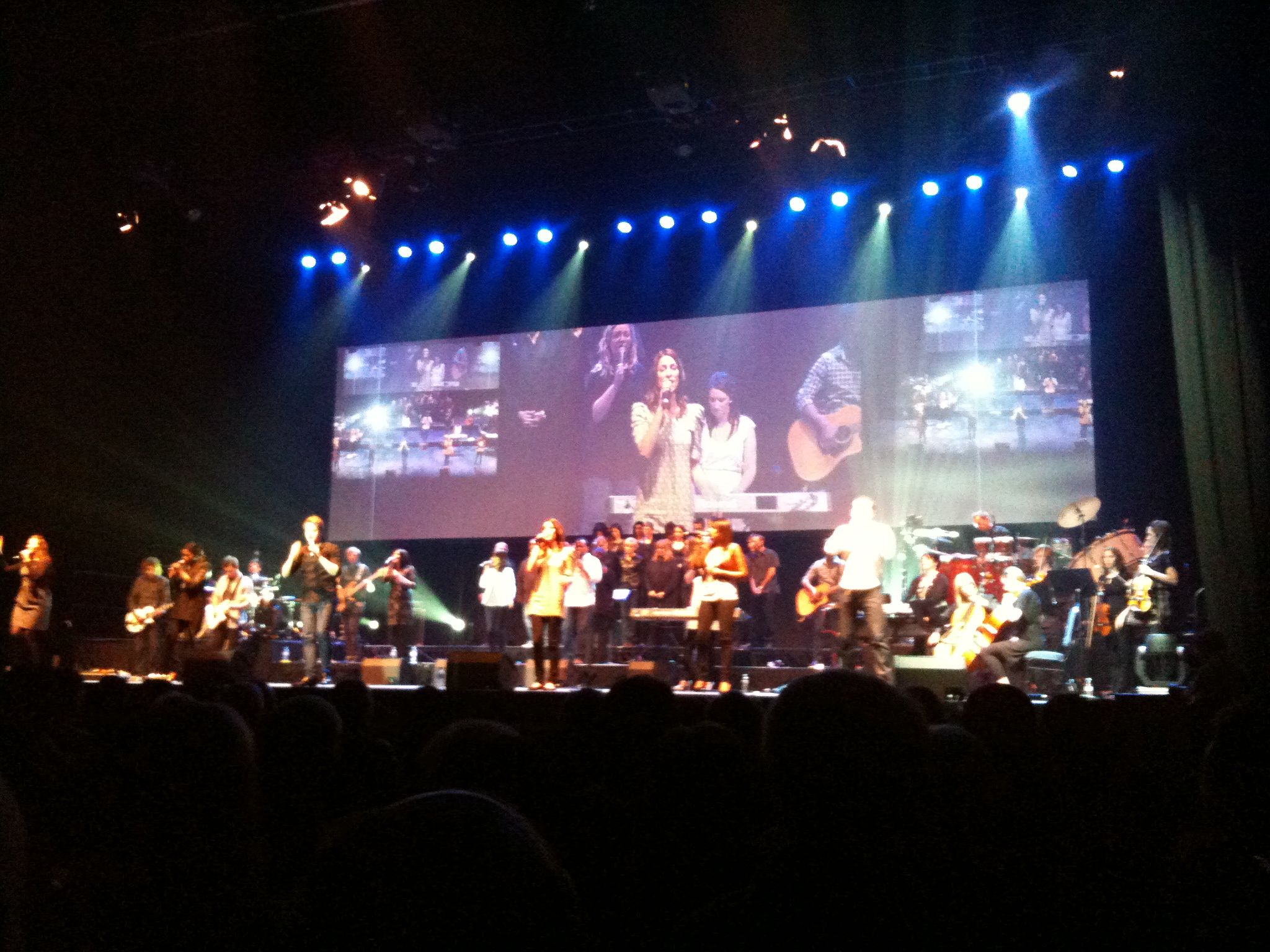
CRC International Conference, Adelaide Entertainment Centre, 2010

CRC Churches International, formerly known as the Christian Revival Crusade, is a Finished Work Pentecostal Christian denomination founded in New Zealand and Australia by Leo Harris in Adelaide, South Australia, with assistance from Thomas Foster in Melbourne, Victoria.

== History ==
Converted under the itinerant ministry of South African, Frederick Van Eyck, Harris' father became an Apostolic Church pastor before they both assumed ministry within the Assemblies of God. Harris was influenced by the British-Israel views of Thomas Foster, whose identification of Anglo-Saxon nations with the ten lost tribes of Israel prompted him to adopt a historicist eschatology. With the subsequent cancellation of his ministry credential and the increasing post-war popularity of his pro-British views throughout parts of Australia and New Zealand, the Commonwealth Revival Crusade was launched organisationally in Adelaide and Melbourne in 1945. The movement later became known as the National Revival Crusade after rejection from the Australian Government for the use of the word "Commonwealth". The movement then later became known as the Christian Revival Crusade before finally taking its current name. With a strong focus on classical Pentecostal distinctives such as baptism in the Holy Spirit, faith healing and deliverance ministry, the CRC grew and sought to establish a new constitution in 1958, which triggered the departure of churches, forming the Revival Centres International (which viewed spirit baptism with the evidence of speaking in tongues as essential for salvation). Nevertheless, growth continued, including a significant influence in Tasmania. Later departures of churches, some of which saw new movements emerge, were all unrelated to the declining popularity of the British-Israel teaching, which has not appeared in official publications since the early 1970s. International growth (principally in Papua New Guinea and in South-East Asia under Barry Silverback, recognised with an Order of Australia medal for his services) saw some 600 churches globally and 120 in Australia under the leadership of Bill Vasilakis by around 2009, with the stated goal of having a presence in every nation by the CRC's centenary in 2045. In 2012 the CRC reported that it had a presence in some 50 nations.

== People ==
Other influential ministers in the CRC include Ken Chant, founder of Vision International College in Sydney, and Barry Chant, a popular author and the founder of Tabor College Australia which has had campuses in several capital cities.

== Locations ==
The majority of CRC churches in Australia are in South Australia and Victoria. In South Australia they include:

- Adelaide Christian Centre, Adelaide
- Christian Family Centre, several locations
- Hope Central, several locations
- Lifehouse, Murray Bridge, South Australia

Churches in Victoria include:

- Grace Fellowship, two locations
- GROW church, two locations
- TurningPoint Church, nine locations

Internationally, there are as of September 2022 several churches in Canada and New Zealand, two in Uganda, and single churches in Brazil, Cambodia, Fiji, Solomon Islands, Sri Lanka, UK, US, and Vanuatu.
