= Thomas Foster (author) =

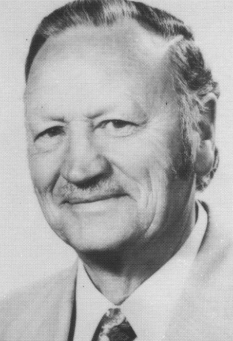
- Thomas N. Foster
- Born: Thomas Norman Foster; February 26, 1909; Mornington, Victoria, Australia
- Died: January 13, 1995 (aged 85); Box Hill Hospital, Victoria, Australia
- Occupations: Theologian, minister, author, bank officer,
- Spouse: Jean Kennedy (m. 1939)
- Writing career
- Period: 1920–1980
- Subjects: Theology, History, British-Israel, Pyramidology,

Thomas Norman Foster was an Australian Pentecostal minister. He was one of the co-founders of the Christian Revival Crusade and is also associated with British Israelism. He was invited by the London B.B.C. to do the radio news reel broadcast to Australia of the procession for the coronation of Queen Elizabeth II, in 1953. He formerly was a commissioner of the British-Israel-World Federation in Victoria., and a YMCA representative for A.I.F., Australia.

He authored books on British Israelism and the baptism in the Holy Spirit.

== Early life ==
Foster was born the ninth of nine children to a family in Mornington, Victoria. Before beginning his religious studies, he worked at the National Bank of Australia in Casterton. He then studied Christian ministry under the teachings of Rev E.E. Baldwin at the Presbyterian Training College in Carlton, a Melbourne suburb.

== Publications ==
Foster wrote several books on the topic of the baptism in the Holy Spirit, British Israelism, and pyramidology.

- The Antichrist: Who is he? (1975)
- Miracles of Inner Healing (1975)
- Amazing Book of Revelation Explained! (1977)
- Great Pyramid Power (1979)
- When Russia Attacks America (1980)
- The Baptism in the Holy Spirit (1985)
- Britain's Royal Throne (1986)
- Soviet Power or God's Kingdom (1988)

== See also ==
- Christianity and Biblical prophecy
- Ten Lost Tribes
