= Vision International College =

Coordinates: 34.027988°S 150.843880°E

Vision International College was founded in 1974 in Launceston, Tasmania, Australia by Ken Chant, an Australian theologian and author. Now located in the Sydney suburb of Minto, New South Wales, the college provides vocational ministry training by distance education with an emphasis on community service. The Reverend Denis Plant now serves as the principal of the college.

== History ==
The college began in Tasmania, Australia as a local church Bible college, to teach and train local church members the word of God and ministry skills to prepare them for service in the local Church. The Ministry still exists as a non-accredited College.

These two ministries operate side by side to offer a broad range of Christian and Biblical teaching options.

== Academics ==
Vision International College is a registered training organisation in Australia and is accredited by the Australian Skills Quality Authority, the national regulator of Australia's vocational education and training sector which is part of the Australian Qualifications Framework.

The college offers the vocational training awards of Certificate III, Certificate IV, Diploma and Advanced Diploma, Graduate Certificate and Graduate Diploma.

== Partnerships ==
Vision International College maintains partnerships with Vision Christian College and the Internet Bible College and with Vision International University in Ramona, California, United States, and Texas University of Theology in Hurst, Texas, United States.

These partnerships make it possible to offer students a pathway of learning from a certificate to an academic degree in theology.

Students who have earned a three-year diploma from Vision International College may gain admission into the bachelor's degree completion program of Vision International University or to the Texas University of Theology. The college offers its programs as part of the consortium of distance education of the Vision International Education Network.

The college maintains a strong commitment to vocational ministry training within the local context of the student. While the curriculum is deep-rooted in a Pentecostal-Charismatic heritage, it remains open-ended and adaptable to any immediate cultural and theological context. The college encourages students to apply their educational experience to their church environment, denomination, and faith community.

The college also maintains the Internet Bible College, an Internet-based option of study for its students which offers accredited awards from Vision International University, non-accredited awards up to the Diploma of Biblical Theology from Vision Christian College, Sydney, Australia, and state-approved degrees from bachelors to PhD degrees through Vision International University in Florida

In addition to individual studies, the college also helps local churches to establish their own local church Bible college.

== See also ==
- Technical and Further Education
