= Ken Chant =

Australian pastor (1933–2024)

- Born: 6 June 1933
- Died: 24 September 2024 (aged 91)
- Occupations: Pastor, author, speaker
- Spouse: Alison Chant
- Website: kdchant.vision.edu

Kenneth David Chant (6 June 1933 – 24 September 2024) was an Australian Pentecostal pastor with CRC Churches International. He was ordained in 1952 in the CRC. He was the elder brother of Barry Chant, who is the founder (with the Reverend Dennis Slape) and former president of Tabor College, Australia.

Chant planted eight churches and was pastor of several others. For several years he was the editor of two Australian charismatic and Pentecostal journals, Revivalist and Vision. He has been the principal of four Bible colleges (in Australia and the US) and has spoken and taught in churches, crusades, conferences, seminars and colleges in a dozen countries worldwide.

On 9 June 2014, Chant was appointed a Member of the Order of Australia (OAM), General Division, in the Queen's Honours List.

Chant died on 24 September 2024, at the age of 91.

== Vision International College and University ==
In 1974 he established Vision International College in Launceston, Tasmania, as a "Bible correspondence school". To enhance this teaching ministry, he moved to the US in 1981 and, with Stan DeKoven, established Vision International University, which merged the correspondence courses with a local church campus program. In 2010 the college had some 7,000 teaching centres in more than 150 countries with more than 100,000 students.

== Author and composer ==
Chant was the author of 50 books, including many college texts. He has also composed a number of gospel songs published in various collections both in Australia and other countries.

== Bibliography ==
- Sitting on Top of The World (Bethany Fellowship, 1972) ISBN 978-0-87123-526-8
- Building the Church God Wants ISBN 978-1-875577-00-2
- Dynamic Christian Foundations ISBN 978-1-61529-045-1
- Dazzling Secrets for Despondent Saints ISBN 978-1-884213-89-2
- Authenticity and Authority of the Bible ISBN 978-1-61529-044-4
- Faith Dynamics ISBN 978-1-61529-064-2
- Clothed With Power ISBN 978-1-61529-039-0
- The Pentecostal Pulpit (Vision Publishing, 2012) ISBN 978-1-61529-050-5
- Better Than Revival (Vision Publishing, 2012) ISBN 978-1-61529-040-6
- The Cross and The Crown (Vision Publishing, 2012) ISBN 978-1-61529-049-9
- Throne Rights (Vision Publishing, 2013) ISBN 978-1-61529-060-4
