= Guillermo Maldonado (pastor) =

Apóstol de la teología de la prosperidad

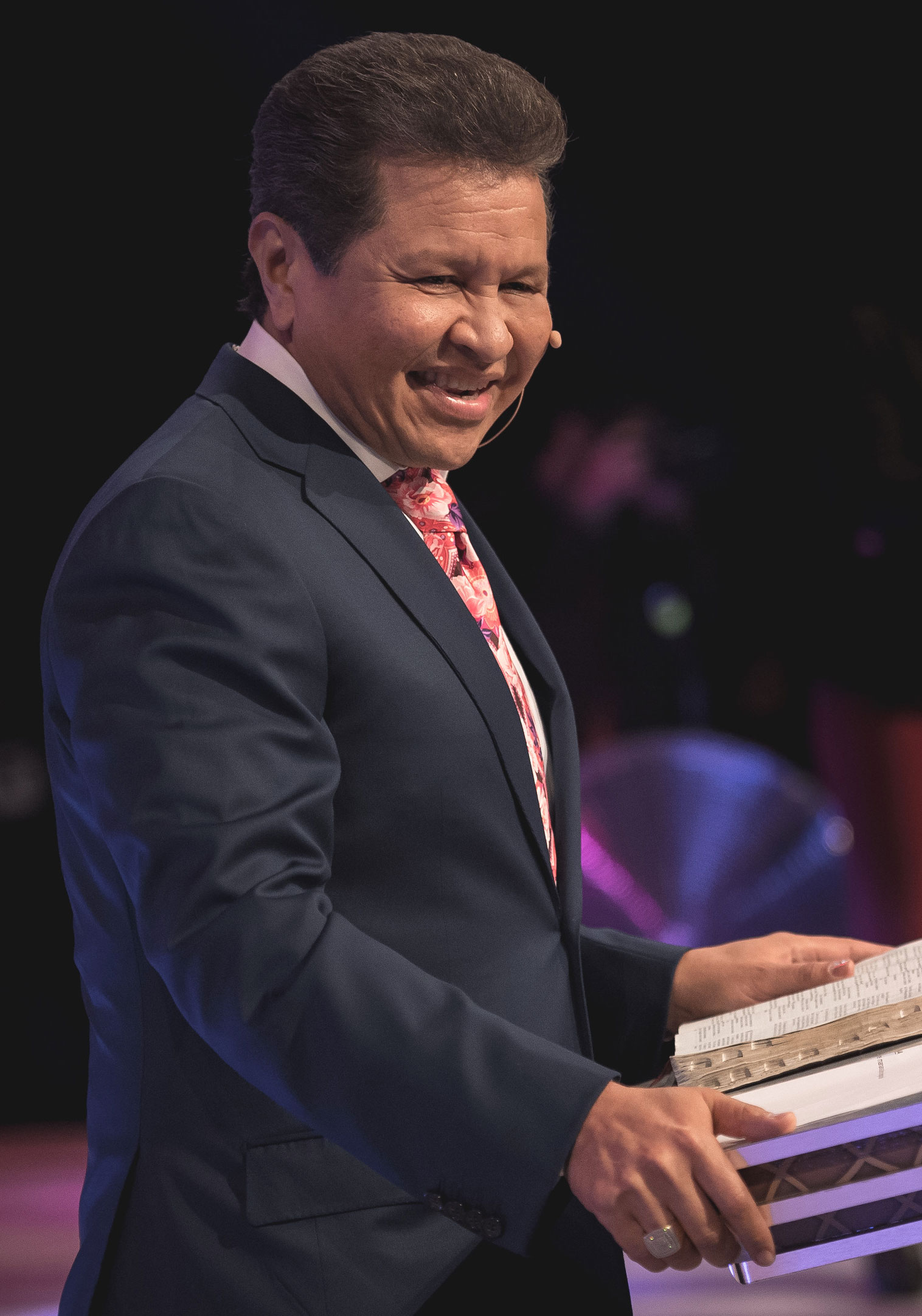
- Maldonado on stage during the CAP leadership conference in Miami, Florida, in October 2016.
- Born: January 10, 1965 (age 61); Honduras
- Occupation: Pastor de la teología de la prosperidad
- Television: The Supernatural Now
- Movement: Pentecostalism
- Spouse: Ana Maldonado (m. 1988; div. 2020)
- Children: 2
- Website: guillermomaldonado.org

Guillermo Maldonado (born 1965 or 1966) is a Honduran-American evangelical Christian, pastor, televangelist, and author. He is the co-founder and senior pastor of El Rey Jesús, a Nondenominational Christian megachurch located in Miami, Florida.

== Personal life ==
Maldonado was born in Honduras and emigrated to the United States in the 1990s. In an interview conducted by Publishers Weekly, Maldonado claimed that Jesus Christ appeared before him during intense prayer and audibly spoke to him saying, "I have called you to bring my supernatural power to this generation." He spent several years traveling across Central and South America, preaching with his ex-wife Ana before settling in Miami. She is originally from Colombia. They have two children, Bryan and Ronald, who are both involved in their parents' ministry.

Maldonado has a master's degree in practical theology from Oral Roberts University and a doctorate in divinity from Vision International University, based in Ramona, California.

In September 2020, Ana Maldonado announced she filed for divorce and started a new ministry independent of El Rey, which closed down shortly thereafter.

On October 3, 2025 during CAP 2025, he was honored by Miami-Dade mayor Daniella Levine-Cava with Apostle Guillermo Maldonado Day which takes place on October 3 each year.

== Ministry ==
Maldonado is the co-founder and senior pastor of El Rey Jesús (English: King Jesus Ministry) in Miami, Florida. It started with twelve members operating out of the Maldonados' living room, and currently hosts 15,000 – 20,000 individuals per week, making it the largest Hispanic church in the United States. The church has several affiliate locations throughout the state of Florida, with additional satellite locations in Georgia and New York. In 2010, the church also opened an orphanage, Casa Hogar, in Honduras.

Maldonado hosts the televangelist program The Supernatural Now, which is aired on televangelist networks TBN, Daystar, and The Church Channel. As of May 22, 2013, his ministry, along with other of his affiliated daughter churches, have a combined membership of over 20,000 weekly congregants.

He has written over 50 books and manuals with many of them translated into Spanish, English, Portuguese, Italian, and French. He speaks Spanish and English, commonly using both languagesduring sermons with simultaneous translation. His book writing is attributed to most of his personal wealth accumulation, although much of the proceeds of these book sales also go towards his international ministerial activities.

== Ideology ==
Maldonado teaches that Christian believers need to use the power of God to demonstrate that God is active in the world today just as he was during the time of the primitive church. He believes that without the supernatural power of God, it is impossible to truly know God and receive his blessings of healing, financial stability, deliverance, among others in our life. His teachings also focus on establishing what he calls the Kingdom of God. He explains that the Kingdom of God is not a physical place, but a network of thoughts, lifestyle, principles, laws and fundamentals that govern the entire universe.

Maldonado was given the title "Apostle" by other senior leaders in the Christian movement as Apostles are messengers that spread the word on missions, usually worldwide., He previously referred to his ex-wife Ana as "Prophetess". (Ephesians 4:11 lists the apostles, the prophets, the evangelists, the pastors, and the teachers as key roles of ther five-fold ministry).

== Political activity ==
Maldonado is presumed to be supportive of Republican Party activities in the state of Florida, since he hosted several Republican politicians, including President Donald Trump and Congressman Carlos A. Giménez. He invited numerous politicians to appear before his congregation including Democrats, but only Republican candidates took him up on the offer. Maldonado has also claimed Trump's presidency was divinely-inspired, and called his presidency proof of "the presence of the living God". The church had previously hosted Republican candidates Bill McCollum and Rick Scott during the 2010 Florida gubernatorial election.

Maldonado led the opening prayer of the US House of Representatives October 14, 2009, and October 10, 2013. He was invited to the White House to witness the signing of an executive order promoting free speech and religious liberty.

Maldonado participated in the inauguration of Honduran President Porfirio Lobo Sosa in 2010.

== Perceived Controversy ==
=== Coronavirus pandemic response ===
During the coronavirus pandemic, Maldonado urged his congregants to show up for worship services in person. "Do you believe God would bring his people to his house to be contagious with the virus? Of course not," he said. He added, "If we die, we die for Christ. If we live, we live for Christ, so what do you lose?"

Maldonado discouraged taking the vaccine against Covid-19: "Do not [take] the vaccine. Believe in the blood of Jesus. Believe in divine immunity."

=== Finances ===
In a financial affidavit attached to her divorce filing, Ana Maldonado claimed that her husband owned property in Miami-Dade, Sunny Isles Beach, Opa-locka, Hialeah, and The Bahamas; several vehicles including a 2020 model Mercedes-Benz, a Lexus LX, and a Dassault Falcon 50 jet registered under the church's name. She further claimed that he had violated "Inurement Prohibition", an IRS rule which forbids key employees at 501(c)(3) organizations from profiting from a charity, and had hidden assets in Italy, Honduras, and Colombia valued at $120 million. Maldonado's lawyers and El Rey denied the allegations and the IRS found no evidence to pursue an investigation based on her unsupportable allegations.

== Bibliography ==
=== Books ===
==== English/Spanish ====
- Maldonado, Guillermo (2000). Inner Healing and Deliverance. Miami: GM International. ISBN 1592720072.
- Maldonado, Guillermo (2002). The Holy Anointing. Miami: GM International. ISBN 1592720382.
- Maldonado, Guillermo (2003). Leaders that Conquer. Miami: GM Ministries. ISBN 1592720234.
- Maldonado, Guillermo (2004). Biblical Foundations For a New Believer. Miami: GM International. ISBN 1592720897.
- Maldonado, Guillermo (2005). Forgiveness. Miami: GM International. ISBN 1592720404.
- Maldonado, Guillermo (2005). The Family. Miami: GM International. ISBN 1592720870.
- Maldonado, Guillermo (2005). Overcoming Depression. Miami: GM International. ISBN 1592720412.
- Maldonado, Guillermo (2005). How to hear the voice of God. Miami: GM International. ISBN 1592720919.
- Maldonado, Guillermo (2005). The New Wine Generation. Miami: GM International. ISBN 1592720390.
- Maldonado, Guillermo (2006). The Ministry of the Apostle. Miami: El Rey Jesús Publications. ISBN 1592722369.
- Maldonado, Guillermo (2007). I Need a father. Miami: ERJ Publications. ISBN 978-1592722211.
- Maldonado, Guillermo (2007). How to Return to Our First Love. Miami: GM International. ISBN 978-1592721627.
- Maldonado, Guillermo (2007). Prayer. Miami: GM International. ISBN 978-1592720903.
- Maldonado, Guillermo (2007). Deliverance The Children's Bread. Miami: ERJ Publications. ISBN 978-1592721603.
- Maldonado, Guillermo (2008). How to Fast Effectively. Miami: ERJ Publications. ISBN 978-1592723058.
- Maldonado, Guillermo (2008). Ascending in Prayer and worship and descending in warfare. Miami: ERJ Publications. ISBN 978-1592723072.
- Maldonado, Guillermo (2009). Jesus Heals Your Sickness Today. Miami: ERJ Publications. ISBN 9781592723379.
- Maldonado, Guillermo (2009). Hope in Time of Crisis. Miami: ERJ Publications. ISBN 9781592723300.
- Maldonado, Guillermo (2009). The Dangers of Unforgiveness. Miami: ERJ Publications. ISBN 9781592723287.
- Maldonado, Guillermo (2011). How to walk in the supernatural power of God. Miami: Whitaker House. ISBN 978-1603742788.
- Maldonado, Guillermo (2011). Overcoming Fear. Miami: ERJ Publications. ISBN 9781592723836.
- Maldonado, Guillermo (2011). Overcoming Pride. Miami: ERJ Publications. ISBN 9781592723829.
- Maldonado, Guillermo (2012). The Glory of God. Miami: Whitaker House. ISBN 9781603744904.
- Maldonado, Guillermo (2013). The Kingdom of Power: How to Demonstrated it Here and Now. Miami: Whitaker House. ISBN 978-1603745505.
- Maldonado, Guillermo (2014). Supernatural Transformation. Miami: Whitaker House. ISBN 9781629111957.

==== Spanish only ====
- Maldonado, Guillermo (2003). La madurez espiritual. Miami: GM Ministries. ISBN 1592720129.
- Maldonado, Guillermo (2003). Evangelismo sobrenatural. Miami: GM Ministries. ISBN 1592720137.
- Maldonado, Guillermo (2004). La inmoralidad sexual. Miami: GM Ministries. ISBN 1592721451.
- Maldonado, Guillermo (2004). El poder de atar y desatar. Miami: GM Ministries. ISBN 1592720749.
- Maldonado, Guillermo (2007). La toalla del servicio. Miami: GM Ministries. ISBN 978-1592721009.
- Maldonado, Guillermo (2007). El fruto del Espíritu. Miami: GM Ministries. ISBN 978-1592721849.
- Maldonado, Guillermo (2007). La doctrina de Cristo. Miami: GM Ministries. ISBN 978-1592720217.
- Maldonado, Guillermo (2007). Descubra su propósito y llamado en Dios. Miami: GM Ministries. ISBN 978-1592720378.
- Maldonado, Guillermo (2010). El carácter de un líder. Miami: GM Ministries. ISBN 978-1592721450.

==== Out of print ====
- Maldonado, Guillermo (2010). Milagros el Poder de Dios en Tu Vida. Miami: Whitaker House. ISBN 978-1603742795.
- Maldonado, Guillermo (2010). Miracle Power in Your Life. Miami: Whitaker House. ISBN 978-1603742788.
- Maldonado, Guillermo (2008). The Kingdom of God and Its Righteousness. Miami: ERJ Publications. ISBN 978-1592722662.

=== Manuals ===
==== English/Spanish ====
- Maldonado, Guillermo. 52 Life Lessons 2 Manual. ISBN 9781592724031.
- Maldonado, Guillermo. Apostles in Action Manual. ISBN 9781592722402.
- Maldonado, Guillermo. Apostolic Discipleship Level 1 Manual. ISBN 9781592723195.
- Maldonado, Guillermo. Apostolic Discipleship Level 2 Manual. ISBN 9781592723386.
- Maldonado, Guillermo. Christian Doctrine Manual. ISBN 9781592722099.
- Maldonado, Guillermo. Divine Health and Healing. ISBN 9781592723461.
- Maldonado, Guillermo. God's Design for the Family Manual. ISBN 9781592723850.
- Maldonado, Guillermo. How to Minister Deliverance Manual. ISBN 9781592721511.
- Maldonado, Guillermo. How to receive and Minister Deliverance Manual. ISBN 9781592723454.
- Maldonado, Guillermo. The Holy Anointing Manual. ISBN 9781592723997.
- Maldonado, Guillermo. Leaders that Conquer I Manual. ISBN 9781592721979.
- Maldonado, Guillermo. Leaders that Conquer II Manual. ISBN 9781592721993.
- Maldonado, Guillermo. Manual for Ministers, Elders and Deacons. ISBN 9781592723201.
- Maldonado, Guillermo. Spiritual Maturity Manual. ISBN 9781592721955.
- Maldonado, Guillermo. Supernatural Evangelism Manual. ISBN 9781592722235.
- Maldonado, Guillermo. The Calling of God. ISBN 9781592723867.
- Maldonado, Guillermo. The Character of a Leader manual. ISBN 9781592721931.
- Maldonado, Guillermo (May 2013). The Kingdom of Power: How to Demonstrate it Here and Now Manual. Whitaker House. ISBN 9781603748858.
- Maldonado, Guillermo. The Vision Manual. ISBN 9781592723720.
- Maldonado, Guillermo. The works of the FLESH Manual. ISBN 9781592721580.

==== Spanish only ====
- Maldonado, Guillermo. Consejeria Cristiana Manual. ISBN 1592723950.
- Maldonado, Guillermo. El Cuidado pastoral. ISBN 9781592722440.
- Maldonado, Guillermo (December 2007). El fruto del espiritu manual. ERJ Publicaciones. ISBN 978-1592721849.
- Maldonado, Guillermo (December 2007). La toalla del servicio manual. GM International. ISBN 978-1592721009.
- Maldonado, Guillermo. Los fundamentos de un discipulo Manual. ISBN 9781592720781.
- Maldonado, Guillermo. Manual para ministros, ancianos y diaconos Manual. ISBN 9781592722839.

== Awards ==
Maldonado won the Spanish Evangelical Press Association (SEPA) award for the best original books in Spanish which are;

- Maldonado, Guillermo (2012). La gloria de Dios. Miami: Whitaker House. ISBN 9781603744911.
- Maldonado, Guillermo (2012). Cómo caminar en el poder sobrenatural de Dios. Miami: Whitaker House. ISBN 9781603742795.
