= Jeff Majors =

American songwriter

- Born: Jeff Graham; Washington, D.C., United States
- Genres: Inspirational Jazz, praise & worship
- Occupation: Harpist
- Instruments: Writer, Arranger, Composer, Harpist
- Years active: 1998–present
- Label: Music One
- Website: jeffmajors.com

JeffMajors Graham (born November 3), who goes by the stage name JeffMajors, is an American Inspirational jazz musician. He started his music career, in 1998, with the release of, Sacred, that was released by Music One Records, which all of his albums have been release by the imprint. Majors released albums in 2000 with Sacred Holidays, 2001's Sacred 2000, Sacred 4 You in 2002, 2005's Sacred Chapter 6, Sacred Major 7th in 2008, and Sacred Eight in 2009, and 2010's Sacred Duets. All but two of these albums chart upon the Billboard magazine charts, primarily on the Gospel Albums chart, with some placements on the R&B Albums chart.

== Early life ==
Majors was born on November 3, in Washington, D.C. as JeffMajors Graham. He was an only child, who was born into a musical family with preaching ancestors in his lineage, Claude Jeter. His father was a singing minister, and his mother a trumpet player. He plays the harp, which he started learning in his teenage years. Majors was mentored under the watchful eye of Alice Coltrane.

== Music career ==
He began his recording music career in 1998, with the release of Sacred by Music One Records on November 17, 1998, and all of his albums have been released by that particular label. This was his breakthrough release on the Billboard magazine Gospel Albums chart, placing at No. 32. His second album, Sacred Holidays, was released on October 10, 2000. The album peaked at No. 28 on the Gospel Albums chart. His subsequent album, Sacred 2000, was released on March 27, 2001, but this did not chart. The next album, Sacred 4 You, released in 2002, and it peaked at No. 13, while also placing on the R&B Albums chart at No. 67. His fifth album released on September 20, 2005, Sacred Chapter 6, and it charted on the Gospel Albums at No. 13 and No. 97 on the R&B Albums chart, while getting the No. 36 position on the Heatseekers Albums. The album, Sacred Major 7th, was released on January 29, 2008, and it placed at No. 11 on the Gospel Albums, while it peaked at No. 51 on the R&B Albums chart. The subsequent album, Sacred Eight, was released on July 28, 2009, yet it failed to chart. His latest release, Sacred Duets, was released in 2010, and it placed at No. 44 on the Gospel Albums chart.

== Discography ==
List of studio albums, with selected chart positions
Title	Album details	Peak chart positions	
Title	Album details	US Gos	US R&B
Sacred	Released: November 17, 1998; Label: Music One; CD, digital download	32	–
Sacred Holidays	Released: October 10, 2000; Label: Music One; CD, digital download	28	–
Sacred 2000	Released: March 27, 2001; Label: Music One; CD, digital download	–	–
Sacred 4 You	Released: 2002; Label: Music One; CD, digital download	13	67
Sacred Chapter 6	Released: September 20, 2005; Label: Music One; CD, digital download	13	97
Sacred Major 7th	Released: January 29, 2008; Label: Music One; CD, digital download	11	51
Sacred Eight	Released: July 28, 2009; Label: Music One; CD, digital download	–	–
Sacred Duets	Released: 2010; Label: Music One; CD, digital download	44	–
