= El Rey Jesús =

King Jesus Ministry
- King Jesus International Ministry
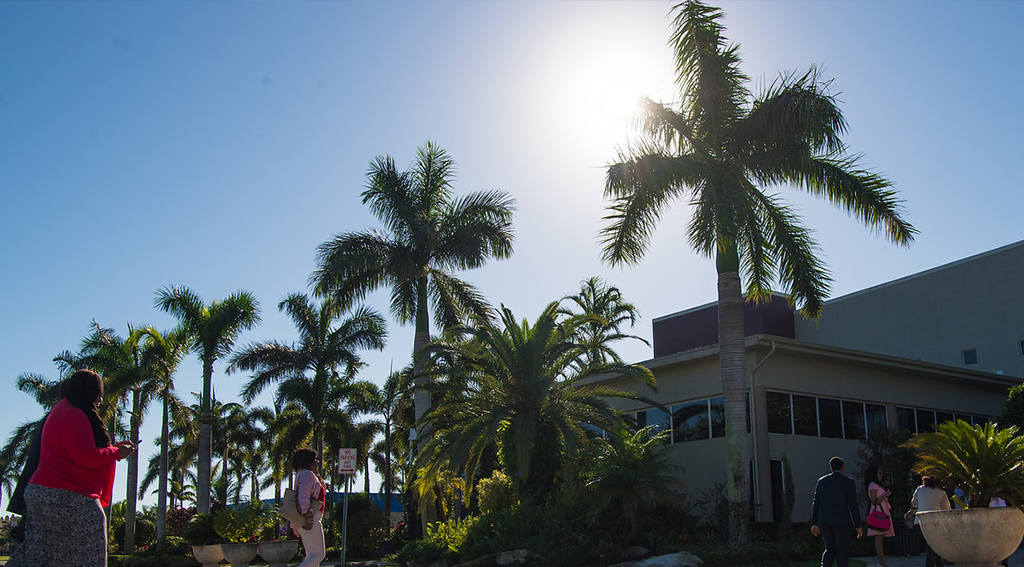
- King Jesus Ministry
- 25°38′6.9936″N 80°25′40.9182″W
- Location: Miami, Florida
- Country: United States
- Language(s): English & Spanish
- Denomination: Non-denominational
- Website: kingjesusministry.org

History
- Former name: El Rey Jesús
- Founded: June 26, 1996
- Founder(s): Guillermo and Ana Maldonado
- Events: Conference of the Apostolic & Prophetic (CAP); RMNT Conference; Supernatural Ministry School (SMS); The Supernatural Conference; Harvest World & Revival USA Tours; Mens Conference; Brilliant Women; Family Conference

Architecture
- Construction cost: US$18 million (2006)

Specifications
- Capacity: 5,776 (expandable to 7,000)

Clergy
- Pastors: Ondina Laszlo; John & Letty Laffite; Carlos & Astry Licona; Tommy Acosta; Ronald Maldonado; Israel & Jennifer Rojas; Michael & Ericka Rodríguez; Alejandro & Belky Morales; Ángel & Íngrid Rodríguez; Dublas & Jessica Rodríguez; Carmena Peña; Ernesto & Maité López; Jorge & Kathy Regueiro; Juan Carlos & Grecia Recino; Gerald & Deborah Zamora; Carlos Acosta; Albert Escoto; Sabino Meija; Jesus Santiesteban; Lisandro Parra

Ministerio Internacional El Rey Jesús, anglicized as King Jesus International Ministry, is a non-denominational Christian church located in Miami, Florida. While the church is best known as El Rey Jesús, the anglicized name of King Jesus Ministry has recently seen more usage alongside attempts to reach out to non-Hispanics in the Miami area. Its senior pastor is currently Apostle Guillermo Maldonado.

== Structure ==
=== Church Founders ===
The founders of the church are Guillermo Maldonado and his ex- wife, Ana Maldonado. Maldonado came to Miami from Honduras, while his wife came from Colombia.

In June 1996, Maldonado's family started the church in the living room of their home with 12 members.

=== Church Growth ===
By 2010, King Jesus Ministry could sustain 7,000 individuals during each service, with a general attendance around 3,000 – 4,000 per week. The majority of the congregants are Hispanic. Other churches associated with King Jesus Ministry are located in Hialeah, Doral, Tamiami, Miami Beach, Homestead, Naples, Plantation and Orlando.

== Ministries ==
=== Orphanage ===
On August 19, 2010, the church founded an orphanage in Honduras in the municipality of Langue, in the department of Valle. The town is located near the border of El Salvador.

The orphanage, known as Home House (translated from Casa Hogar) has room for about 60 children. Home House provides food, clothing, and shelter as well as spiritual and intellectual education. Together with Guillermo Maldonado, the home was inaugurated by the at-the-time Honduran President Porfirio Lobo Sosa.

=== Media ministry ===
King Jesus Ministry has stations on radio and television, as well as a website and pages on various social media platforms. Television programs are broadcast on Enlace, Daystar, Telemundo Miami, Church Channel, Word Network, Trinity Broadcasting Network, and Mega TV Miami. The radio station is broadcast 24 hours a day in Spanish on Radio Zoe 1430 AM (WOIR).

=== Conference of the Apostolic and Prophetic (CAP) ===
The King Jesus Ministry has an annual conference, Conferencia Apostólica y Profética, (in English, the Conference of the Apostolic and Prophetic), or CAP. This conference consists of sessions for several days, with Pentecostal Christian preachers as speakers. Notable speakers in recent years have been Benny Hinn, Paula White, and Bill Johnson. In recent years, this event has taken place in the Kaseya Center located in Downtown Miami. As of 2025, the most recent event was held in the Watsco Center after temporarily holding the event in their temple due to COVID-19 restrictions.

=== Community involvement ===
During the 2010 Florida Republican Party Gubernatorial primary elections, King Jesus Ministry was visited by two candidates, Bill McCollum and Rick Scott, who spoke to the congregation and presented their stands on certain issues. Associate Pastor John Laffite served as a translator to the mostly Hispanic congregation, encouraging church members to pray for their leaders and exercise their right to vote. Rick Scott won the primary and attended the church two Sundays before Election Day.

In 2019, the church held a campaigning event for President Donald Trump, resulting in critics stating that the church had violated tax rules barring religious groups from participating in political campaigns. For example, the Freedom From Religion Foundation stated that, "In urging congregants to come to a political rally, and in hosting the political rally, King Jesus Ministry appears to have inappropriately used its religious organization." Founder Guillermo Maldonado, responding to the controversy, declared, "If you want to come, do it for your pastor. That's a way of supporting me."

=== Building development ===
El Rey Jesús building under construction

Starting from June 1, 2004, the church actively began to develop a plan for the expansion of the church property and buildings. By early October 2006, the newly built temple was inaugurated.

== Affiliated Churches ==
The church has many affiliated churches (primarily in Florida) as well as a handful outside the state.
