= Barry Chant =

Australian theologian

- Born: Barry Mostyn Chant; 23 October 1938 (age 87); Memorial Hospital, North Adelaide, South Australia, Australia
- Occupations: Theologian, minister, author
- Spouse: Vanessa Bennett (m. 1960)
- Relatives: Ken Chant (brother)
- Writing career
- Period: 1970–present
- Subjects: Theology, children's fiction, history
- Website: barrychant.com

Barry Mostyn Chant (born 1938) is an Australian academic, pentecostal pastor and author. His most significant contribution to the Pentecostal movement in Australia was as its primary historian. Heart of Fire: The story of Australian Pentecostalism was published by the House of Tabor in 1973, a publishing company attached to Tabor College Australia, in Adelaide, which Chant founded and led as principal.

Chant's first book was also the first comprehensive history of Australian Pentecostalism based on grey literature and oral histories collected within 60 years of the establishment of the key Pentecostal churches in Australia. His collected sources, are now deposited in the archives of Alphacrucis, a Bible college in Sydney, New South Wales.

Chant was also founding editor of Australia's New Day magazine, the first national magazine addressing all expressions of charismatic renewal in Australia. Chant's doctoral dissertation was titled "The spirit of Pentecost: origins and development of the Pentecostal movement in Australia, 1870-1939". His degree was conferred by Macquarie University in 2000, and a second volume of Pentecostal history was published from his thesis.

Chant married Vanessa Bennett at the Adelaide Crusade Centre in 1960. They have three children.

== Education ==
Chant graduated from the University of Adelaide in 1960 with a Bachelor of Arts degree with honours in English literature. He obtained a Diploma of Education (University of Adelaide, 1963), Bachelor of Divinity degree (Melbourne College of Divinity, 1968) and Doctor of Ministry degree (Luther Rice Seminary, 1985)

== Career summary ==
Chant began his working life as a secondary school teacher at Murray Bridge High School in South Australia, where he taught until 1963. In addition to his seminal work in writing the history of Pentecostal movements in Australia, Chant promoted Christian communications and cross-denoninational collaboration in Australia for more than 40 years, through the colleges, conferences, magazines and publishing company that he led. Chant was ordained as a minister of the Christian Revival Crusade (now CRC Churches International) in 1962. He became pastor of the Port Adelaide CRC assembly from 1964 to 1975 and then served as an associate pastor of the Adelaide Crusade Centre from 1975 to 1978. Appointed dean of the Crusade Bible College in Adelaide in 1964, Chant was promoted to principal of the college in 1977. He increased both the footprint of the college in Australia, and extended the college's influence, largely through publications.

Chant was the founding editor of Australia's New Day magazine (1977 - 1996), which addressed Australian pentecostals, charismatics and evangelicals, providing a platform for Australian Christian writers at a time when there were few outlets for their work. He also hosted a regular Sunday night talkback radio show on 5DN in Adelaide, South Australia, from 1983 to 1986. He chaired the United Charismatic Conventions in South Australia from 1980 to 1991, a Christian conference that encouraged charismatic renewal in mainline churches. In 1986 the convention at Wayville Showgrounds included international speakers: Reinhard Bonnke and Paul Yonggi Cho and it drew crowds from diverse church backgrounds from throughout Australia. In 1979, Chant led the redevelopment of Tabor College as a multidenominational charismatic tertiary institution. He was president of the college until 2003. He also founded Tabor College Sydney in 1992 and remained there as principal for the next decade. From 2003 to 2010, Chant was the senior pastor of the International Congregation at Wesley Mission, Sydney.

== Other roles ==
- Editor, PCBC Journal (1997–2003)
- President, Association of Pentecostal and Charismatic Bible Colleges of Australasia (1994–2002)
- Chairman, Association of Pentecostal and Charismatic Bible Colleges of Australasia (1990–1993)
- Secretary, Australian Pentecostal Ministers Fellowship Steering Committee (1988–1991)
- Member, Advisory Committee International Charismatic Consultation on World Evangelism (1987–1997)
- Member, Austral-Asian Christian Church (1983–2003)
- Member, Heads of Churches Committee, Adelaide, S.A. (1979–1985)
- Member, Australian Pentecostal Ministers Fellowship Steering Committee (1978–2004)
- National vice-chairman, Christian Revival Crusade Inc, Australia (1977–1980)
- Member, Rotary Club of Adelaide West (1976–1985)
- State chairman, Christian Revival Crusade Inc, South Australia (1974–1985)

== Published books ==
- About Angels and You (Open Book, 2002)
- Walking with a Limp: a Charismatic Approach to Suffering (Open Book, 2002; Tabor, 2014)
- Praying in the Spirit (Sovereign World, 2002)
- Spindles and the Crocodile (CD) (Turnaround Music, 2001)
- Spindles and the Crocodile (Tabor, 1999)
- The Scion Factor: The Kosmon Report Part 2 (Albatross, 1996)
- The Doom of Drakon: The Kosmon Report Part 1 (Albatross, 1996)
- Breaking the Power of the Past (Tabor, 1995)
- Spiritual Gifts: A Reappraisal – a Biblical and Practical Handbook (Tabor, 1993)
- Spindles and the Sleepy Lizard (Tabor, 1989)
- The Return (with Winkie Pratney) (Sovereign World, 1988)
- Creative Living: how to live the kind of life you've always wanted to live (Tabor, 1987)
- Your Guide to God's Power (Sovereign World, 1987)
- Jack-in-the-box [Musical] (Tabor, 1987)
- Straight Talk About Marriage (Tabor, 1983)
- Spindles and the Children (Tabor, 1983)
- Spindles and the Lamb [Musical] (Genesis Music, 1982)
- Spindles and the Orphan (Tabor, 1980)
- Spindles and the Wombat (Tabor, 1978)
- Straight Talk About Sex (Whitaker, 1977)
- Spindles and the Eagles (Tabor, 1976)
- Spindles of the Dusty Range (Tabor, 1975)
- Heart of Fire: The story of Australian Pentecostalism (Tabor, 1973) ISBN 0-9598050-0-1
- The Secret is Out (Crusade, 1971)
- Fact or Fantasy (Crusade, 1970)
- About angels and you
- Biblical Typology (Vision Foundations for Ministry) with Gill Waddle, 1996
- Connecting with the church, the community and the world in the 21st century
- Firm in the faith: Ten basic Bible study modules for new Christians
- How To Live The Kind Of Life You've Always Wanted To Live
- How To Study
- Spindles and the Giant Eagle Rescue (An Australian outback adventure)
- The Australian Career Of John Alexander Dowie, 1992?
- The Church (Vision Foundations for Ministry) with Ken Chant, 1988
- The Miracle of Calvary
- Upon Dry Ground

== Magazines ==
- Australia's New Day magazine ISSN 0159-7442 (published between 1987 and 1996)
