= Religion of Black Americans =

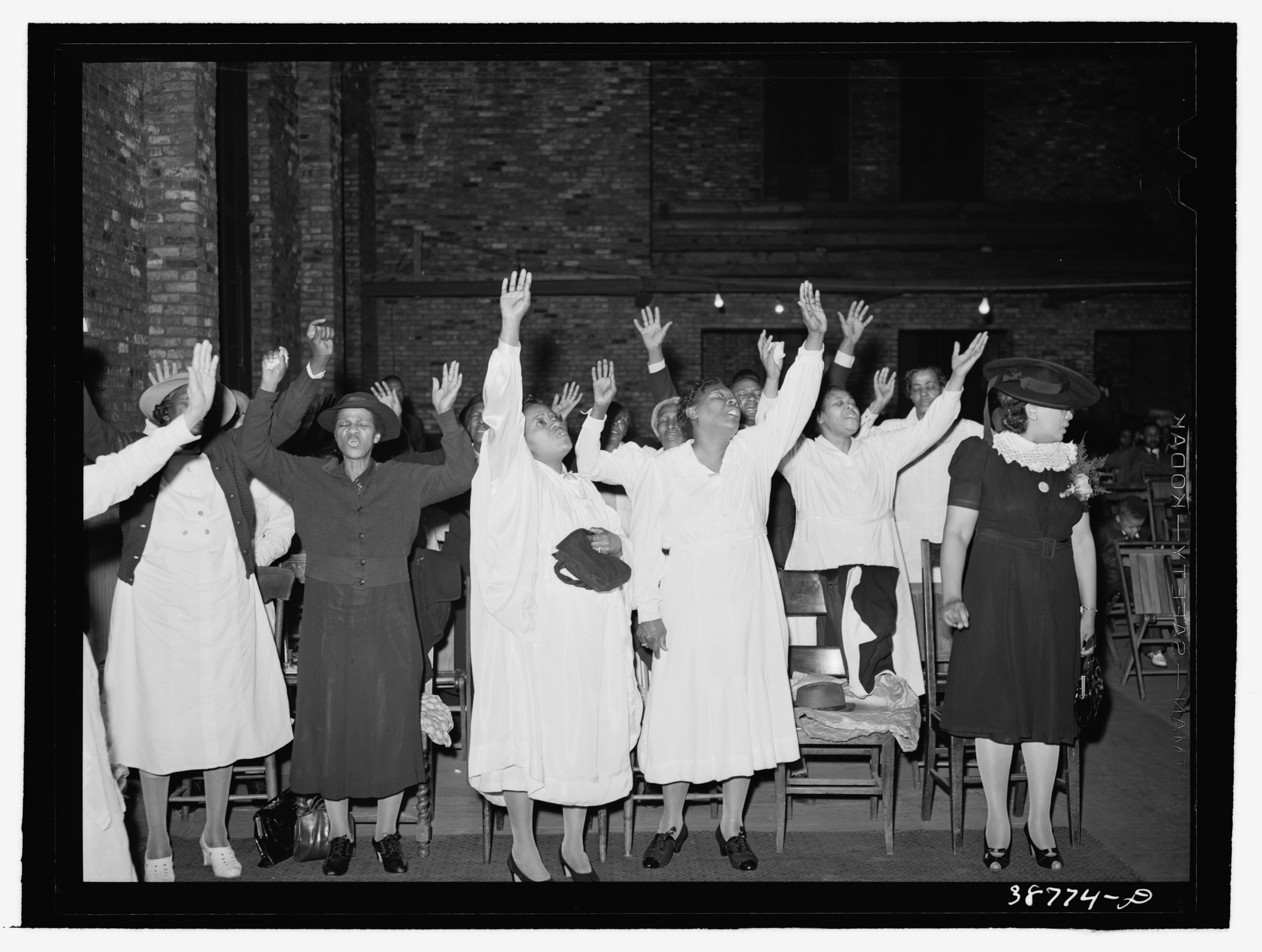
Women engaged in praise at a Pentecostal worship service in Chicago, Illinois, 1941

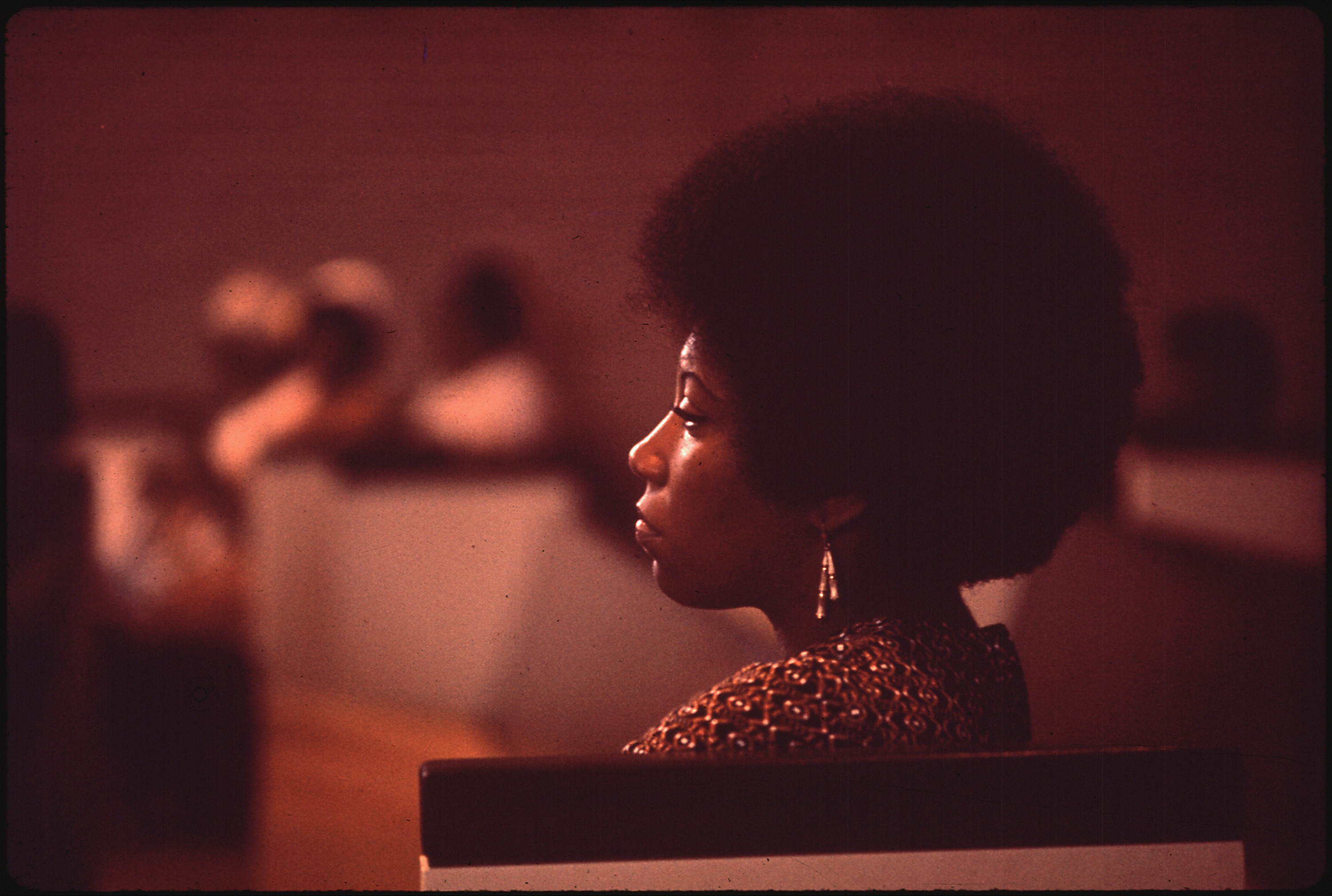
Woman at a Baptist church service in Alabama, July 1972

Since the first African slaves arrived in North America, religion has likely been a powerful force in the development of African American culture and identity. However, there is little evidence of organized religion among African slaves and their descendants in the Thirteen Colonies before 1775. The Methodist and Baptist churches became more active in the 1780s. Their growth was quite rapid for the next 150 years, until their membership included the majority of Black Americans.

After Emancipation in 1863, Freedmen organized their own churches, chiefly Baptist, followed by Methodists. Other Protestant denominations, and the Catholic Church, played smaller roles. In the 19th century, the Wesleyan-Holiness movement, which emerged in Methodism, as well as Holiness Pentecostalism in the 20th century were important, and later the Jehovah's Witnesses. Centuries after early Black Muslims, The Nation of Islam and el-Hajj Malik el-Shabazz (also known as Malcolm X) reinvigorated Islam in the 20th century. Powerful pastors often played prominent roles in politics, often through their leadership in the American civil rights movement, as typified by Martin Luther King Jr., Jesse Jackson and Al Sharpton.

== Religious demographics ==
Religious affiliation of African Americans in 2007
1. Black Protestant (57.0%)
2. Evangelical Protestant (15.0%)
3. Mainline Protestant (4.00%)
4. Roman Catholic (5.00%)
5. Islam (3.00%)
6. Jehovah's Witness (1.00%)
7. Other Christian (1.00%)
8. Other religion (1.00%)
9. Unaffiliated (11.0%)
10. Atheist or agnostic (2.00%)

The vast majority of Black Americans are Protestants, with descendants of American chattel slavery being largely Baptists or adhering to other forms of Evangelical Protestantism. According to a survey conducted between November 9, 2019, and June 2, 2020, Pew Research found that 78% of Black American adults have a religious affiliation compared to 72% of American adults generally, and about 75% of Black American adults identify as Christian (66% Protestant Christian, 6% Catholic Christian, and 3% Other Christian) compared to 66% of the general US adult population 3% also identify as Muslim.

Black Americans are more religious than the U.S. population as a whole. About 97% of adult Black Americans believe in God or a higher power (compared to 90% of American adults generally), 59% consider religion "very important" in their lives, and 54% consider belief in God necessary to be moral and have good values.

In 2019 there were approximately three million African American Catholics in the US, 24% of whom worshiped in the country's 798 predominantly African American parishes.

== History ==
=== Colonial era ===
Many enslaved Africans brought religion with them from Africa, including Islam and African traditional religions. The Portuguese introduced Christianity to many Western Africans; and before Islamic expansion in North Africa, parts of the region were already Christian or indigenous.

Until 1800, the majority of slaves in the United States had not embraced Christianity. Prior to the 1700s, the majority of slaves in the United States practiced traditional West African religions or Islam, with a smaller number converting to Protestantism. Additionally, Catholicism was also prevalent among Black Americans in states such as Maryland, Kentucky and Louisiana during the period of slavery.

In the 1770s no more than 1% of black people in the United States had connections with organized churches. The numbers grew rapidly after 1789. The Anglican Church had made a systematic effort to proselytize, especially in Virginia, and to spread information about Christianity, and the ability to read the Bible, without making many converts.

No organized African religious practices are known to have taken place in the Thirteen Colonies. In the mid-20th century scholars debated whether there were distinctive African elements embedded in black American religious practices, as in music and dancing. Scholars no longer look for such cultural transfers regarding religion.

Muslims practiced Islam surreptitiously or underground throughout the era of the enslavement of African people in North America. The story of Abdul Rahman Ibrahima Sori, a Muslim prince from West Africa who spent 40 years enslaved in the United States from 1788 onwards before being freed, demonstrates the survival of Muslim belief and practice among enslaved Africans in America.

Prior to the American Revolution, masters and revivalists spread Christianity to slave communities, including Catholicism in Spanish Florida and California, and in French and Spanish Louisiana, and Protestantism in English colonies, supported by the Society for the Propagation of the Gospel.

In the First Great Awakening (ca. 1730–1755) Baptists were drawing Virginians, especially poor-white farmers, into a new, much more democratic religion. Baptist gatherings made slaves welcome at their services, and a few Baptist congregations contained as many as 25% slaves. Baptists and Methodists from New England preached a message against slavery, encouraged masters to free their slaves, converted both slaves and free blacks, and gave them active roles in new congregations. The first independent black congregations were started in the South before the Revolution, in South Carolina and Georgia. Believing that, "slavery was contrary to the ethics of Jesus", Christian congregations and church clergy, especially in the North, played a role in the Underground Railroad, especially Wesleyan Methodists, Quakers and Congregationalists. White clergy within evangelical Protestantism actively promoted the idea that all Christians were equal in the sight of God, a message that provided hope and sustenance to oppressed slaves.

Over the decades and with the growth of slavery throughout the South, some Baptist and Methodist ministers gradually changed their messages to accommodate the institution. After 1830, white Southerners argued for the compatibility of Christianity and slavery, with a multitude of both Old and New Testament citations. They promoted Christianity as encouraging better treatment of slaves and argued for a paternalistic approach. In the 1840s and 1850s, the issue of accepting slavery split the nation's largest religious denominations (the Methodist, Baptist and Presbyterian churches) into separate Northern and Southern organizations; see Methodist Episcopal Church, South, Southern Baptist Convention, and Presbyterian Church in the Confederate States of America). Schisms occurred, such as that between the Wesleyan Methodist Church and the Methodist Episcopal Church.

Southern slaves generally attended their masters' white churches, where they often outnumbered the white congregants. They were usually permitted to sit only in the back or in the balcony. They listened to white preachers, who emphasized the obligation of slaves to keep in their place, and acknowledged the slave's identity as both person and property. Preachers taught the master's responsibility and the concept of appropriate paternal treatment, using Christianity to improve conditions for slaves, and to treat them "justly and fairly" (Col. 4:1). This included masters having self-control, not disciplining under anger, not threatening, and ultimately fostering Christianity among their slaves by example.

Slaves also created their own religious observances, meeting alone without the supervision of their white masters or ministers. The larger plantations with groups of slaves numbering 20, or more, tended to be centers of nighttime meetings of one or several plantation slave populations. These congregations revolved around a singular preacher, often illiterate with limited knowledge of theology, who was marked by his personal piety and ability to foster a spiritual environment. African Americans developed a theology related to Biblical stories having the most meaning for them, including the hope for deliverance from slavery by their own Exodus. One lasting influence of these secret congregations is the African American spiritual.

Black religious music is distinct from traditional European religious music; it uses dances and ring shouts, and emphasizes emotion and repetition more intensely.

=== Formation of churches (18th century) ===
Scholars disagree about the extent of the native African content of black Christianity as it emerged in 18th-century America, but there is no dispute that the Christianity of the black population was grounded in evangelicalism.

Central to the growth of community among black people was the black church, usually the first community institution to be established. Starting around 1800 with the African Methodist Episcopal Church, African Methodist Episcopal Zion Church and other churches, the black church grew to be the focal point of the black community. The black church was both an expression of community and unique African-American spirituality, and a reaction to discrimination.

The church also served as neighborhood centers where free black people could celebrate their African heritage without intrusion by white detractors. The church also the center of education. Since the church was part of the community and wanted to provide education; they educated the freed and enslaved black community. Seeking autonomy, some black religious leaders like Richard Allen founded separate black denominations.

The Second Great Awakening (1800–20s) has been called the "central and defining event in the development of Afro-Christianity".

Free black religious leaders also established black churches in the South before 1860. After the Great Awakening, many black Christians joined the Baptist Church, which allowed for their participation, including roles as elders and preachers. For instance, First Baptist Church and Gillfield Baptist Church of Petersburg, Virginia, both had organized congregations by 1800 and were the first Baptist churches in the city.

=== Preaching ===
Historian Bruce Arnold argues that successful black pastors historically undertook multiple roles. These include:

- The black pastor is the paterfamilias of his church, responsible for shepherding and holding the community together, passing on its history and traditions, and acting as spiritual leader, wise counselor, and prophetic guide.
- The black pastor is a counselor and comforter stressing transforming, sustaining, and nurturing abilities of God to help the flock through times of discord, doubts, and counsels them to protect themselves against emotional deterioration.
- The black pastor is a community organizer and intermediary.

Raboteau describes a common style of black preaching first developed in the early nineteenth century, and common throughout the 20th and into the 21st centuries:

The preacher begins calmly, speaking in conversational, if oratorical and occasionally grandiloquent, prose; he then gradually begins to speak more rapidly, excitedly, and to chant his words and time to a regular beat; finally, he reaches an emotional peak in which the chanted speech becomes tonal and merges with the singing, clapping, and shouting of the congregation.

Many Americans interpreted great events in religious terms. Historian Wilson Fallin contrasts the interpretation of the American Civil War and Reconstruction in white versus black Baptist sermons in Alabama. White Baptists expressed the view that:

God had chastised them and given them a special mission – to maintain orthodoxy, strict biblicism, personal piety, and traditional race relations. Slavery, they insisted, had not been sinful. Rather, emancipation was a historical tragedy and the end of Reconstruction was a clear sign of God's favor.

In sharp contrast, black Baptists interpreted the Civil War, Emancipation and Reconstruction as:

God's gift of freedom. They appreciated opportunities to exercise their independence, to worship in their own way, to affirm their worth and dignity, and to proclaim the fatherhood of God and the brotherhood of man. Most of all, they could form their own churches, associations, and conventions. These institutions offered self-help and racial uplift, and provided places where the gospel of liberation could be proclaimed. As a result, black preachers continued to insist that God would protect and help him; God would be their rock in a stormy land.

Black sociologist Benjamin Mays analyzed the content of sermons in the 1930s and concluded:

They are conducive to developing in the Negro a complacent, laissez-faire attitude toward life. They support the view that God in His good time and in His own way will bring about the conditions that will lead to the fulfillment of social needs. They encourage Negroes to feel that God will see to it that things work out all right; if not in this world, certainly in the world to come. They make God influential chiefly in the beyond, and preparing a home for the faithful – a home where His suffering servants will be free of the trials and tribulations which beset them on earth.

=== After 1865 ===
Black Americans, once freed from slavery, were very active in forming their own churches, most of them Baptist or Methodist, and giving their ministers both moral and political leadership roles. In a process of self-segregation, practically all black Americans left white churches so that few racially integrated congregations remained (apart from some Catholic churches in Louisiana). Four main organizations competed with each other across the South to form new Methodist churches composed of freedmen. They were the African Methodist Episcopal Church; the African Methodist Episcopal Zion Church; the Colored Methodist Episcopal Church (founded 1870 and composed of the former black members of the white Methodist Episcopal Church, South) and the well-funded Methodist Episcopal Church (Northern white Methodists), which organized Mission Conferences. By 1871 the Northern Methodists had 88,000 black members in the South, and had opened numerous schools for them.

African-Americans during Reconstruction Era were politically the core element of the Republican Party and the minister played a powerful political role. Their ministers had powerful political roles that were distinctive since they did not primarily depend on white support, in contrast to teachers, politicians, businessmen, and tenant farmers. Acting on the principle expounded by Charles H. Pearce, an AME minister in Florida: "A man in this State cannot do his whole duty as a minister except he looks out for the political interests of his people," over 100 black ministers were elected to state legislatures during Reconstruction. Several served in Congress and one, Hiram Revels, in the U.S. Senate.

=== Urban churches ===
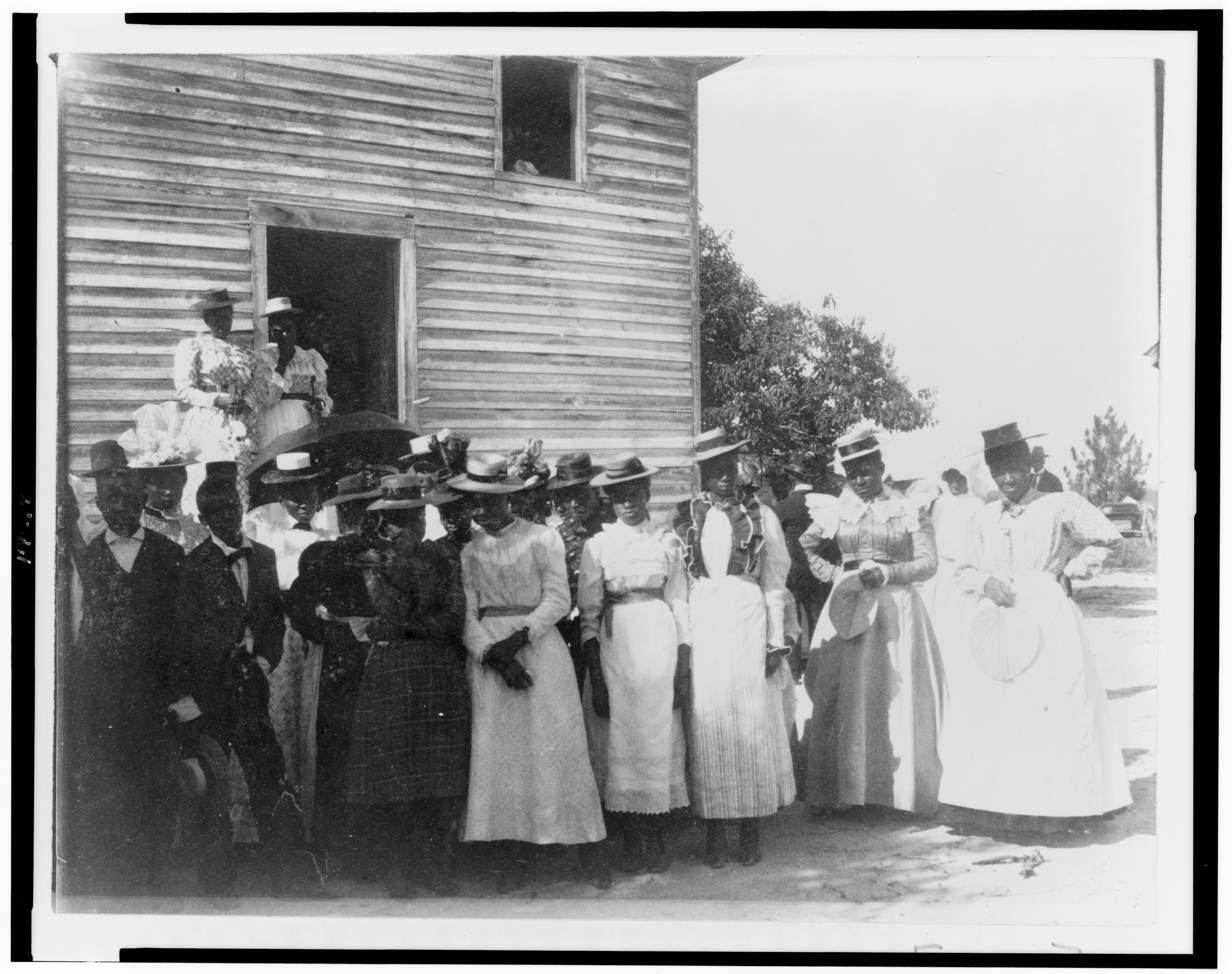
Black Americans outside a church in Georgia, 1900

The great majority of African-Americans lived in rural areas where services were held in small makeshift buildings. In the cities black churches were more visible. Besides their regular religious services, the urban churches had numerous other activities, such as scheduled prayer meetings, missionary societies, women's clubs, youth groups, public lectures, and musical concerts. Regularly scheduled revivals operated over a period of weeks reaching large and appreciative crowds.

Charitable activities abounded concerning the care of the sick and needy. The larger churches had a systematic education program, besides the Sunday schools, and Bible study groups. They held literacy classes to enable older members to read the Bible. Private black colleges, such as Fisk in Nashville, often began in the basement of the churches. Church supported the struggling small business community.

Most important was the political role. Churches hosted protest meetings, rallies, and Republican party conventions. Prominent laymen and ministers negotiated political deals, and often ran for office until disfranchisement took effect in the 1890s. In the 1880s, the prohibition of liquor was a major political concern that allowed for collaboration with like-minded white Protestants. In every case, the pastor was the dominant decision-maker. His salary ranged from $400 a year to upwards of $1500, plus housing – at a time when 50 cents a day was good pay for unskilled physical labor.

Increasingly the Methodists reached out to college or seminary graduates for their ministers, but most of Baptists felt that education was a negative factor that undercut the intense religiosity and oratorical skills they demanded of their ministers.

After 1910, as black people migrated to major cities in both the North and the South, there emerged the pattern of a few very large churches with thousands of members and a paid staff, headed by an influential preacher. At the same time there were many "storefront" churches with a few dozen members.

== Historically black Christian denominations ==
=== Methodism (inclusive of the holiness movement) ===
==== African Methodist Episcopal Church ====
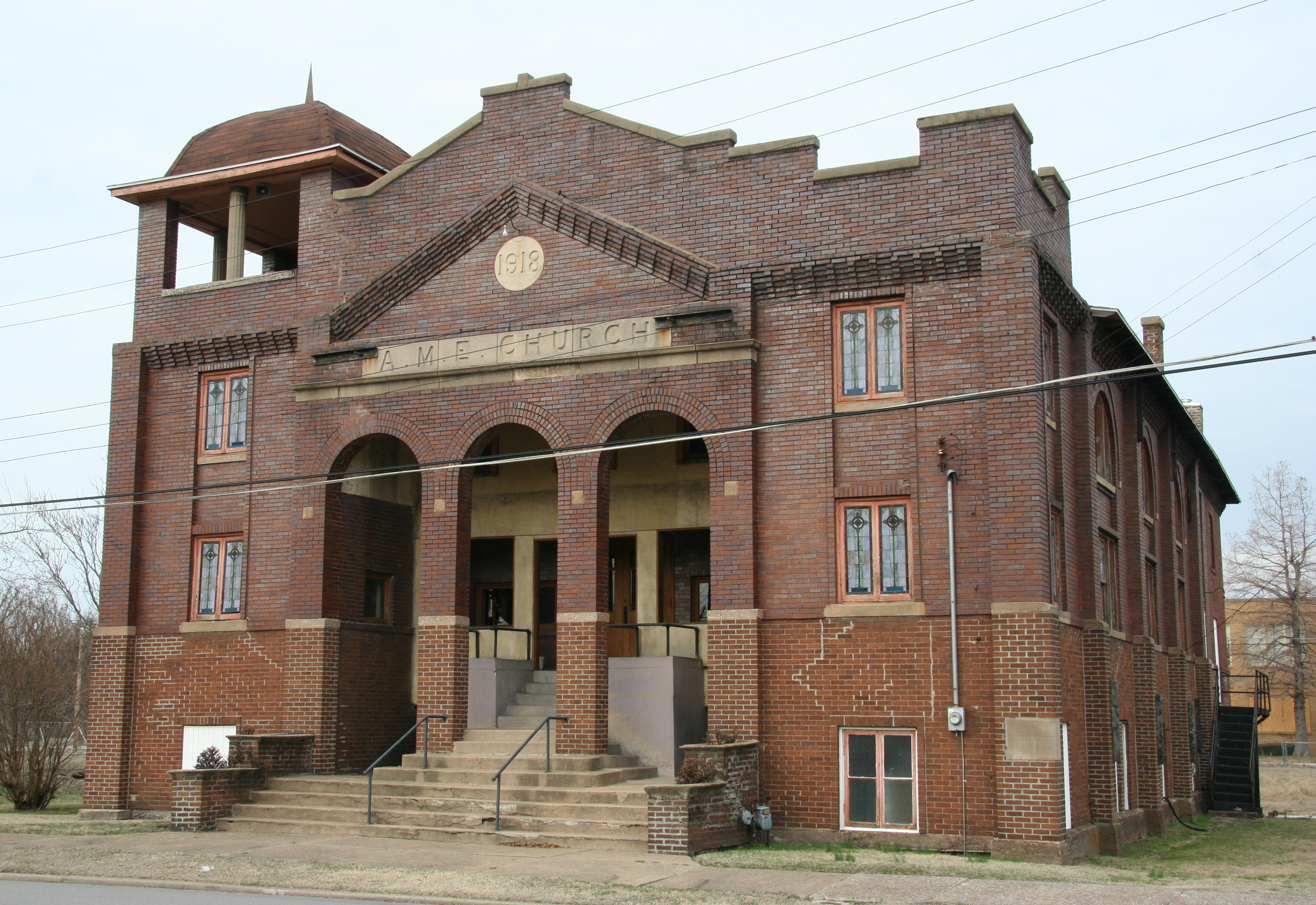
The 1918 A.M.E. Church, Cairo, Illinois

In 1787, Richard Allen and his colleagues in Philadelphia broke away from the Methodist Episcopal Church and in 1816 founded the African Methodist Episcopal Church (AME). It began with 8 clergy and 5 churches, and by 1846 had grown to 176 clergy, 296 churches, and 17,375 members. The 20,000 members in 1856 were located primarily in the North. AME national membership (including probationers and preachers) jumped from 70,000 in 1866 to 207,000 in 1876

AME put a high premium on education. In the 19th century, the AME Church of Ohio collaborated with the Methodist Episcopal Church, a predominantly white denomination, in sponsoring the second independent historically black college (HBCU), Wilberforce University in Ohio. By 1880, AME operated over 2,000 schools, chiefly in the South, with 155,000 students. For school houses they used church buildings; the ministers and their wives were the teachers; the congregations raised the money to keep schools operating at a time the segregated public schools were starved of funds.

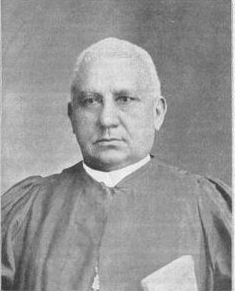
Bishop Henry McNeal Turner, AME leader in Georgia

After the Civil War Bishop Henry McNeal Turner (1834–1915) was a major leader of the AME and played a role in Republican Party politics. In 1863 during the Civil War, Turner was appointed as the first black chaplain in the United States Colored Troops. Afterward, he was appointed to the Freedmen's Bureau in Georgia. He settled in Macon and was elected to the state legislature in 1868 during Reconstruction. He planted many AME churches in Georgia after the war.

In 1880 he was elected as the first southern bishop of the AME Church after a fierce battle within the denomination. Angered by the Democrats' regaining power and instituting Jim Crow laws in the late nineteenth century South, Turner was the leader of black nationalism and proposed emigration of the black community to Africa.

In terms of social status, the Methodist churches have typically attracted the black leadership and the middle class. Like all American denominations, there were numerous schisms and new groups were formed every year.

==== African Methodist Episcopal Zion Church ====
The AMEZ denomination was officially formed in 1821 in New York City, but operated for a number of years before then. The total membership in 1866 was about 42,000. The church-sponsored Livingstone College in Salisbury, North Carolina was founded to train missionaries for Africa. Today the AME Zion Church is especially active in mission work in Africa and the Caribbean, especially in Nigeria, Liberia, Malawi, Mozambique, Angola, Ivory Coast, Ghana, England, India, Jamaica, Virgin Islands, Trinidad, and Tobago.

==== Wesleyan-Holiness movement ====
The Holiness Movement emerged within the Methodist Church in the late 19th century. It emphasized the Methodist belief of "Christian perfection"–the belief that it is possible to live free of voluntary sin, and particularly by the belief that this may be accomplished instantaneously through a second work of grace. Although many within the holiness movement remained within the mainline Methodist Church, new denominations were established, such as the Free Methodist Church, Wesleyan Methodist Church, and Church of God. The Wesleyan Methodist Church was founded to herald Methodist doctrine, in addition to promoting abolitionism.

The Church of God (Anderson, Indiana), with its beginnings in 1881, held that "interracial worship was a sign of the true Church", with both whites and blacks ministering regularly in Church of God congregations, which invited people of all races to worship there. Those who were entirely sanctified testified that they were "saved, sanctified, and prejudice removed". When Church of God ministers, such as Lena Shoffner, visited the camp meetings of other denominations, the rope in the congregation that separated whites and blacks was untied "and worshipers of both races approached the altar to pray". Though outsiders would sometimes attack Church of God services and camp meetings for their stand for racial equality, Church of God members were "undeterred even by violence" and "maintained their strong interracial position as the core of their message of the unity of all believers".

==== Other Methodist connexions ====
- African Union First Colored Methodist Protestant Church and Connection
- African Methodist Episcopal Zion Church
- Christian Methodist Episcopal Church
- Church of Christ (Holiness) U.S.A.
- Lumber River Conference of the Holiness Methodist Church

=== Baptists ===
After the Civil War, black Baptists desiring to practice Christianity away from racial discrimination, rapidly set up separate churches and separate state Baptist conventions. In 1866, black Baptists of the South and West combined to form the Consolidated American Baptist Convention. This Convention eventually collapsed but three national conventions formed in response. In 1895 the three conventions merged to create the National Baptist Convention. It is now the largest African-American religious organization in the United States.

Since the late 19th century to the present, a large majority of black Christians belong to Baptist churches.

Baptist churches are locally controlled by the congregation, and select their own ministers. They choose local men – often quite young – with a reputation for religiosity, preaching skill, and ability to touch the deepest emotions of the congregations. Few were well-educated until the mid-twentieth century, when Bible Colleges became common. Until the late twentieth century, few of them were paid; most were farmers or had other employment. They became spokesman for their communities, and were among the few black people in the South allowed to vote in Jim Crow days before 1965.

National Baptist Convention

The National Baptist Convention was first organized in 1880 as the Foreign Mission Baptist Convention in Montgomery, Alabama. Its founders, including Elias Camp Morris, stressed the preaching of the gospel as an answer to the shortcomings of a segregated church. In 1895, Morris moved to Atlanta, Georgia, and founded the National Baptist Convention, USA, Inc., as a merger of the Foreign Mission Convention, the American National Baptist Convention, and the Baptist National Education Convention. The National Baptist Convention, USA, Inc., is the largest African-American religious organization.

The civil rights movement of the 1950s and 1960s was highly controversial in many black churches, where the minister preached spiritual salvation rather than political activism. The National Baptist Convention became deeply split. Its autocratic leader, Rev. Joseph H. Jackson had supported the Montgomery bus boycott of 1956, but by 1960 he told his denomination they should not become involved in civil rights activism.

Jackson was based in Chicago and was a close ally of Mayor Richard J. Daley and the Chicago Democratic machine against the efforts of Martin Luther King Jr. and his aide the young Jesse Jackson Jr. (no relation to Joseph Jackson). In the end, King led his activists out of the National Baptist Convention into their own rival group, the Progressive National Baptist Convention, which supported the extensive activism of the King's Southern Christian Leadership Conference.

==== Other Baptist denominations ====
- Full Gospel Baptist Church Fellowship
- National Baptist Convention of America, Inc.
- National Missionary Baptist Convention of America
- Progressive National Baptist Convention

=== Pentecostalism ===
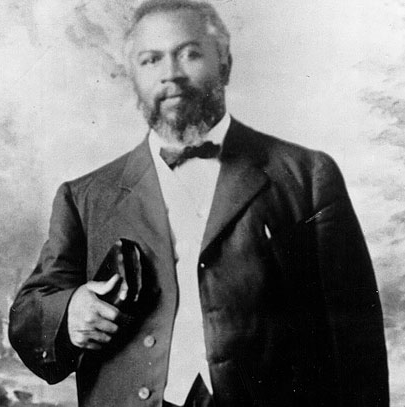
William Seymour, leader of the Azusa Street Revival

John M. Giggie wrote that black Methodists and Baptists sought middle class respectability. In sharp contrast the new Holiness Pentecostalism, in addition to the Holiness Methodist belief in entire sanctification, which was based on a sudden religious experience that could empower people to avoid sin, also taught a belief in a third work of grace accompanied by glossolalia. These groups stressed the role of the direct witness of the Holy Spirit, and emphasized the traditional emotionalism of black worship.

William J. Seymour, a black preacher, traveled to Los Angeles where his preaching sparked the three-year-long Azusa Street Revival in 1906. Worship at the racially integrated Azusa Mission featured an absence of any order of service. People preached and testified as moved by the Spirit, spoke and sung in tongues, and fell in the Spirit. The revival attracted both religious and secular media attention, and thousands of visitors flocked to the mission, carrying the "fire" back to their home churches.

The crowds of black people and white people worshiping together at Seymour's Azusa Street Mission set the tone for much of the early Pentecostal movement. Pentecostals defied social, cultural and political norms of the time that called for racial segregation and Jim Crow. Holiness Pentecostal denominations (the Church of God in Christ, the Church of God, the Pentecostal Holiness Church), and the Pentecostal Assemblies of the World (a Oneness Finished Work Pentecostal denomination) were all interracial denominations before the 1920s. These groups, especially in the Jim Crow South were under great pressure to conform to segregation.

Ultimately, North American Pentecostalism would divide into white and African-American branches. Though it never entirely disappeared, interracial worship within Pentecostalism would not reemerge as a widespread practice until after the Civil Rights Movement. The Church of God in Christ (COGIC), an African American Pentecostal denomination founded in 1896, has become the largest Pentecostal denomination in the United States today.

==== Other Pentecostal denominations ====
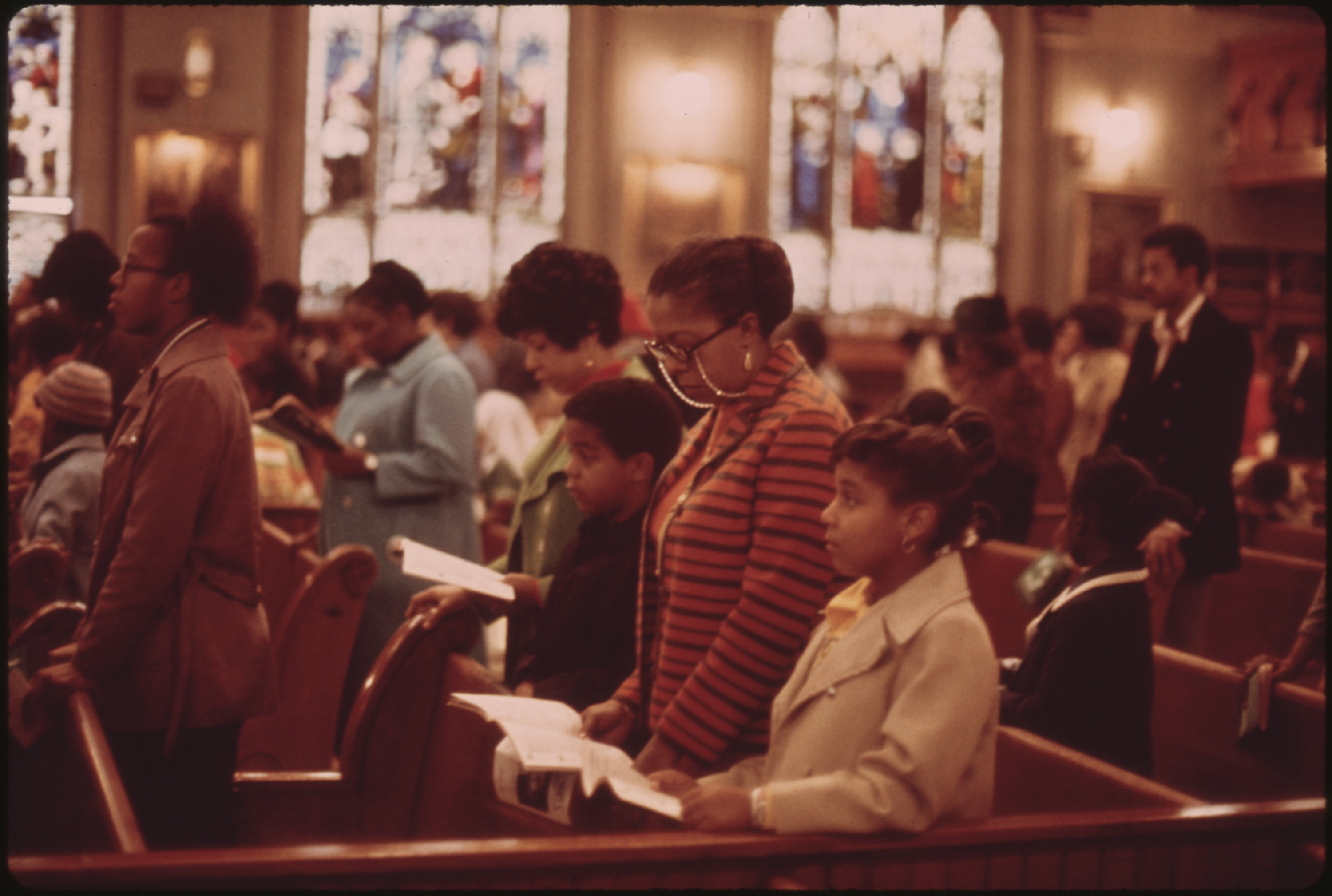
Worshippers at Holy Angel Catholic Church on the South Side of Chicago, Illinois, 1973

- Apostolic Faith Mission
- Church of Our Lord Jesus Christ of the Apostolic Faith
- Fire Baptized Holiness Church of God of the Americas
- Mount Sinai Holy Church of America
- Pentecostal Assemblies of the World
- United House of Prayer for All People
- United Pentecostal Council of the Assemblies of God, Incorporated

== Non-Christian religions ==
=== African religions ===
The syncretist religion Louisiana Voodoo has traditionally been practiced by Creoles of color and African-Americans in Louisiana, while Hoodoo is a system of beliefs and rituals historically associated with Gullah and Black Seminoles. Hoodoo and Voudou are active religions in African-American communities in the United States, and there is a reclamation of these traditions by African-American youth.

Some African Americans practice Louisiana Voodoo, especially African Americans in Louisiana. Louisiana Voodoo was brought to Louisiana by African slaves from Benin during the French colonial era. Black studies historian, John Blassingame, explained various West African nations were transported to Louisiana during the Atlantic slave trade and they brought their belief of the serpent god with them called Damballa. Over time these various West African groups in Louisiana developed one Voodoo culture that centers on snake reverence and ancestral veneration within the slave community and African-American communities. The accounts of Voodoo practiced at Congo Square were exaggerated and sensationalized. Writers witnessing Voodoo practices in New Orleans wrote about sexual related themes and crude and bloody practices. Historians suggests the origins of Louisiana Voodoo has West-Central roots. According to research, the records of slave ships imported people from West Africa in present-day Benin and the Ardra people brought their spiritual traditions called foddun that became the core of Louisiana Voodoo. According to academic research, during the slave trade the majority of West Africans imported to Louisiana were Bambara people, and the majority of Central Africans imported to Louisiana were Bakongo. This resulted in a mix of cultures from Benin, Senegal, and the Congo region that fused Catholicism that created Voodoo in Louisiana. The practices of Louisiana Voodoo are snake reverence of Damballa, ancestral veneration, dancing, singing, spirit possession, animal sacrifice, and communal eating. During slavery at Congo Square in New Orleans, Louisiana, whites banned the playing of African songs and singing African music because they feared a possible slave revolt among the slaves, it was a secret code of communication across plantations, and the African music played became the music of Louisiana Voodoo ceremonies. Historian Gwendolyn Midlo Hall argues that Louisiana Voodoo developed from enslaved Black Americans during the colonial era, and less from the influences of Haitians.

"New Orleans Voodoo" (also called Louisiana Voodoo) may have survived in Louisiana's Black Spiritual churches. In the article, Mississippi River Valley Voodoo: A Living Tradition? it reads: "Following more than a century of suppression, the religion that throve into the late nineteenth century was struggling to survive by the 1940s and may have ceased to exist as a living faith shortly thereafter. While some scholars have suggested that the African American Spiritual churches of New Orleans are modern manifestations of Voodoo, these congregations lack key features of the historical Voodoo religion and have but a tenuous connection with it." However, spiritual church members deny their beliefs and practices are influenced by Voodoo.

=== Islam ===
Historically, at least 15% of enslaved Africans brought to the Americas were Muslims, and among the 400,000 Africans enslaved in the United States, tens of thousands are thought to have been Muslims. While most Africans converted to Christianity, the practice of Islam among some Africans continued into modern times and, more controversially, may have had an influence on modern Black American culture. After Muhammad's death, Arab Muslims began to expand into North Africa. During the period in which slaves were purchased from Africa, the expansion of Arab Muslims into sub-Saharan Africa led to the introduction and eventual widespread acceptance of Islam throughout much of Africa. In addition to trade and occupation, the presence of Islam in Africa was reinforced by the exchange of goods, ideas, and cultural traditions, which fostered intellectual and commercial ties between the African continent and the Middle East. During the twentieth century, many African Americans who were seeking to reconnect with their African heritage converted to Islam, mainly through the influence of black nationalist groups with distinctive beliefs and practices. These included the Moorish Science Temple of America, and the largest organization, the Nation of Islam, founded in the 1930s, which had at least 20,000 members by 1963.,

Prominent members of the Nation of Islam included the human rights activist Malcolm X and the boxer Muhammad Ali. Malcolm X is considered the first person to have started the conversion of African Americans to mainstream Sunni Islam, after he left the Nation and made the pilgrimage to Mecca and changed his name to el-Hajj Malik el-Shabazz. In 1975, Warith Deen Mohammed, the son of Elijah Muhammad, took control of the Nation after his father's death and converted the majority of its members to orthodox Sunni Islam.

African-American Muslims constitute 20% of the total U.S. Muslim population. They are represented in Sunni and Shia denominations. A 2014 Pew survey showed that 23% of American Muslims were converts to Islam, including 8% who converted to Islam from historically black Protestant traditions. According to The Huffington Post, "observers estimate that as many as 20,000 Americans convert to Islam annually.", most of them are women and African-Americans. Other religions claim to be Islamic, including the Moorish Science Temple of America and offshoots of it, such as the Nation of Islam and the Five Percenters.

=== Judaism ===
The American Jewish community includes Jews with African-American backgrounds. African-American Jews belong to each of the major American Jewish denominations—Orthodox, Conservative, Reform—as well as minor religious movements within Judaism. Like Jews with other racial backgrounds, there are also African-American Jewish secularists and Jews who may rarely or never participate in religious practices. Estimates of the number of Black Jews in the United States range from 20,000 to 200,000. Many Black Jews have mixed racial or ethnic backgrounds, most of whom are Jewish by birth, by while others are Jewish by conversion.

=== Black Hebrew Israelites ===
Black Hebrew Israelites (also called Black Hebrews, African Hebrew Israelites, and Hebrew Israelites) are groups of African Americans who believe that they are the descendants of the ancient Israelites. To varying degrees, Black Hebrews adhere to the religious beliefs and practices of both Christianity and Judaism. They are not recognized as Jews by the greater Jewish community. Many of them choose to call themselves Hebrew Israelites or Black Hebrews rather than Jews in order to indicate their claimed historic connections.

=== Others ===
There are African-Americans, mostly converts, who adhere to other faiths, namely the Baháʼí Faith, Buddhism, Hinduism, Jainism, Scientology, and Rastafari.

A 2019 report examined a sect of African-American women who venerated the African deity Oshun in a form of Modern Paganism.

== See also ==
- Black theology
- National Black Catholic Congress
- Southern Christian Leadership Conference
- Louisiana black church fires
- African diaspora religions
- Black church
- Atheism in the African diaspora
- Islam in the African diaspora
- African American–Jewish relations
- African-American Jews
- Black Judaism
- Black Mormons
- Black people and Mormonism
- Black Catholicism
- T. D. Jakes
- Christian hip hop
- Black Gospel music
- Louisiana Voodoo

History:

- Methodist Episcopal Church, South
- Wesleyanism
- Colored Episcopal Mission
- Racial segregation of churches in the United States
- Religion in the United States
- History of religion in the United States
