= Baptism by fire =

Christian theological concept

The phrase baptism by fire, baptism of fire or baptism with fire is a Christian theological concept originating from the words of John the Baptist in Matthew 3:11.

It also has related meanings in military history and popular culture.

== Christianity ==
The term baptism with fire originated from the words of John the Baptist in Matthew 3:11 (and the parallel passage in Luke 3:16):

Matthew 3:11 "I indeed baptize you with water unto repentance: but he that cometh after me is mightier than I, whose shoes I am not worthy to bear: he shall baptize you with the Holy Ghost, and with fire" King James Version 1611

Many Christian writers, such as John Kitto, have noted that this could be taken as a hendiadys, the Spirit as fire, or as pointing out two distinct baptisms - one by the Spirit, one by fire. If two baptisms, then various meanings have been suggested for the second baptism, by fire - to purify each single individual who accept Jesus Christ as Lord and Savior to be the temple of the Holy Spirit, to cast out demons and to destroy the stronghold of the flesh by the Fire of God.

Of this expression, J. H. Thayer commented: "to overwhelm with fire (those who do not repent), i.e., to subject them to the terrible penalties of hell". W. E. Vine noted regarding the "fire" of this passage: "of the fire of Divine judgment upon the rejectors of Christ, Matt. 3:11 (where a distinction is to be made between the baptism of the Holy Spirit at Pentecost and the fire of Divine retribution)". Arndt and Gingrich speak of the "fire of divine Judgment Mt. 3:11; Lk. 3:16".

However, as J. W. McGarvey observed, the phrase "baptize you ... in the fire" also refers to the day of Pentecost, because there was a "baptism of fire" which appears as the tongue of fire on that day. Parted "tongues," which were mere "like as of fire ... sat upon" each of the apostles. Those brothers were "overwhelmed with the fire of The Holy Spirit" on that occasion. Similarly, Matthew Henry comments that as "fire make[s] all it seizes like itself... so does the Spirit make the soul holy like itself."

The concept of baptism by 'fire and the Holy Spirit' lies behind the Consolamentum rite of the Cathars or Albigenses.

=== Methodism (inclusive of the holiness movement) ===
In Methodism (inclusive of the holiness movement), baptism by fire is synonymous with the second work of grace: entire sanctification, which is also known as Baptism with the Holy Spirit. John Fletcher, Methodism's systematic theologian, explicated baptism with the Holy Ghost and fire as the experience of Christian perfection (entire sanctification): "Scripture reckons the coming of the spiritual kingdom of Christ with power into the heart of believers, and the baptism of fire, or the perfect love, which burns up the chaff of sin, thoroughly purges God's floor, and make the hearts of perfect believers a habitation of God through the Spirit, and not a nest for indwelling sin." John Fletcher quoted George Whitefield who answered the reason that the second blessing was given after the Ascension of Jesus: "Because till then He was Himself on the earth, and had not taken on Him the kingly office, not pleaded the merits of His death before His heavenly Father, by which he purchased that invaluable blessing for us." Fletcher described entire sanctification as being the "full measure of the spirit, which perfects Christian believers." This theology is echoed in the doctrine of the various Methodist denominations:

Justified persons, while they do not outwardly commit sin, are nevertheless conscious of sin still remaining in the heart. They feel a natural tendency to evil, a proneness to depart from God, and cleave to the things of earth. Those that are sanctified wholly are saved from all inward sin—from evil thoughts and evil tempers. No wrong temper, none contrary to love remains in the soul. All their thoughts, words, and actions are governed by pure love. Entire sanctification takes place subsequently to justification, and is the work of God wrought instantaneously upon the consecrated, believing soul. After a soul is cleansed from all sin, it is then fully prepared to grow in grace. —"Articles of Religion", Book of Discipline, Free Methodist Church

In the view of Fletcher, the "latter day glory" would "exceed the first effusion of the Spirit" at Pentecost; he wrote: "Seeing that they on the day of Pentecost bare witness to the grace of our Lord, so shall we, and like them spread the name of love." To this end, "Fletcher taught that the day of Pentecost was the opening of the dispensation of the Spirit, and he insisted that believers now are called upon to receive the same baptismal fire."

Jabulani Sibanda, a theologian in the Wesleyan-Arminian tradition, says with regard to entire sanctification:

This experience is important because it is the second work of grace. It leads to purity of heart, and it is the baptism by fire (Matthew 3:11) in which impurities are dealt with. This experience symbolizes the death to self as Paul said that he is crucified with Christ, “…I do not live but Christ lives in me” (Galatians 2:20). It is the singleness of the eye. “The light of the body is the eye: if therefore thine eye be single, thy whole body shall be full of light. But if thine eye be evil, thy whole body shall be full of darkness. If therefore the light that is in thee be darkness, how great is that darkness” (Matthew 6:22–23 KJV). Singleness of the eye is the opposite of what James addresses as double mindedness. He calls people to cleanse their hands and purify their hearts. The person focuses on God alone; he or she is no longer unstable. It is also an experience of devotedness and separateness to God. This is an experience of one giving oneself totally to God.

=== Irwinism ===
The Fire-Baptized Holiness Church, under the leadership of Benjamin Hardin Irwin, taught a third work of grace (baptism with fire) subsequent to the first work of grace and second work of grace of Methodism. The Fire-Baptized Holiness Church, as with Methodism, held that the first work of grace was the New Birth; the second work of grace was entire sanctification (baptism with the Holy Spirit). However, whereas John Fletcher (the systematic theologian of Methodism) regarded the baptism with the Holy Ghost and fire as being the second work of grace, Benjamin Hardin Irwin distinguished between baptism with the Holy Ghost and baptism with fire, holding that the latter was a third work of grace. The Constitution and General Rules of the Fire Baptized Holiness Association, with respect to the third work of grace (baptism of fire) taught:

We do not believe that the baptism with fire is an experience independent of, or disassociated from, the Holy Ghost, but we do believe that the divine baptism of Jesus is two-fold. Christ's baptism is with the Holy Ghost and with fire. We believe that it is He, the divine Paraclete, abiding in the heart of the purified believer, who creates an intense longing for the experience of the baptism with fire, and, as the Executive of the Godhead, baptizes those in whom He dwells with the baptism with fire, and that none can receive the experience of the baptism with fire except those in whom the personal Holy Ghost already abides.

However, after the advent of Holiness Pentecostalism, the majority of the Fire-Baptized Holiness Church accepted the Holiness Pentecostal position of the third work of grace being baptism of the Holy Ghost and Fire evidenced by speaking in tongues, while another part of the Fire-Baptized Holiness Church (now called the Bible Holiness Church) returned to the Methodist position of two works of grace: (1) New Birth and (2) entire sanctification (Baptism with the Holy Spirit).

=== Pentecostalism ===
In Pentecostalism, baptism by fire is synonymous with Spirit baptism, which is accompanied by glossolalia (speaking in tongues). In Holiness Pentecostalism, baptism with the Holy Spirit evidenced by speaking in tongues is the third work of grace, following the first work of grace (the New Birth) and the second work of grace (entire sanctification). The baptism of the Holy Ghost is taught by Holiness Pentecostals to empower the Christian believer for service to God.

=== The Church of Jesus Christ of Latter-Day Saints ===
In the Church of Jesus Christ of Latter-day Saints, the term relates to confirmation and the phrase "baptism of fire" or "baptism by fire" appears several times in Latter-day Saint canonized scripture, including: Doctrine and Covenants 20:41; Doctrine and Covenants 33:11; Doctrine and Covenants 39:6; and 2 Nephi 31:13–17.

The relation between the confirmation of the Holy Ghost and the baptism of fire is explained by David A. Bednar, a church apostle: "the Holy Ghost is a sanctifier who cleanses and burns dross and evil out of human souls as though by fire".

== Military usage ==
In the military usage, a baptism by fire refers to a soldier's first time in battle. Writers such as John Deedy have stated that the term in a military sense entered the English language in 1822 as a translation of the French phrase baptême du feu. From military usage, the term has extended into many other areas in relation to an initiation into a new role. The "Baptism By Fire: CIA Analysis of the Korean War" compilation features 1,300 documents spanning 1947 to 1954, offering insights on the Korean Peninsula. Released on the war's 60th anniversary, it constitutes the largest set of CIA records on the topic, coinciding with the "New Documents and New Histories: Twenty-First Century Perspectives on the Korean War" conference jointly organized by the Harry S. Truman Presidential Library and the CIA in Independence, Missouri."

== In popular culture ==
The phrase 'baptism of fire' has also entered into popular culture. An example is the "Brothers in Arms" song by the Dire Straits, which covers the British involvement in the Falklands War:

Through these fields of destructions
baptisms of fire
I've witnessed your suffering
as the battle raged higher.

== See also ==
- Baptism with the Holy Spirit

== Sources ==
- Arndt, William; Gingrich, F. W. (1967), Greek-English Lexicon of the New Testament and Other Early Christian Literature, Chicago, IL: University of Chicago.
- McGarvey, J. W. (1875), Commentary on Matthew and Mark, Des Moines, IA: Eugene Smith.
- Thayer, J. H. (1958), Greek-English Lexicon of the New Testament, Edinburgh, Scotland: T. & T. Clark.
- Vine, W. E. (1991), Expository Dictionary of New Testament Words, Iowa Falls, IA: World.
