= Calvary Holiness Association =

Holiness Pentecostal denomination

- Classification: Protestant
- Orientation: Holiness Pentecostalism
- Polity: Connexionalism
- Origin: 1977
- Congregations: 17

The Calvary Holiness Association is a Holiness Pentecostal denomination of Christianity that is based in Georgia, United States.

== History ==
The Holiness movement among Baptists in Georgia began late in the 19th century among ministers in the Little River Baptist Association. Two churches were excluded from the Little River Association in 1893 because of their teachings on holiness. These two churches and two newly formed churches met in 1894 in Wilcox County, Georgia to organize the Holiness Baptist Association.

The Calvary Holiness Association was formed in 1977. Dissatisfied members separated from the Holiness Baptist Association on January 7, 1977 for what they termed "broken confidence and lack of trust in the trustee committee". On January 15, 1977, nine churches met at Community Holiness Baptist Church in Cook County, Georgia and organized a new association, with James A. Harrell as moderator, and Carl H. Carlton as clerk. Four more churches joined on January 29, and a committee of seven was formed to draw up articles of faith, discipline and rules of decorum. On March 26, the articles of faith and by-laws were adopted, the name Calvary Holiness Association, Incorporated agreed upon, and an application to incorporate made. The Association was incorporated and charter granted by the state of Georgia on October 7, 1977.

The faith and order is similar to the parent body. The association's beliefs include three works of grace (1) New Birth (first work of grace), (2) entire sanctification as a definite second work of grace, (3) Baptism of the Holy Ghost, with glossolalia as the initial evidence (third work of grace). Its ordinances include baptism by immersion, Lord's supper and feet washing. Tithing is practiced. They maintain abstinence from any use of tobacco or strong drink, excessive use of medicine, use of slang expressions, gluttony, and that ordinary labor and business should not be conducted on Sunday. Membership in secret societies (such as the Masonic Lodge) is forbidden. The Calvary Holiness Association maintains Calvary Holiness Campground in Coffee County, Georgia south of Jacksonville. Annual association meetings, youth camps and camp meetings are held at the campground.

In 1985 the association was made up of 17 churches with 464 members, in 13 counties in the southern part of the state of Georgia. 27 ordained ministers, 4 licensed ministers, and 4 exhorters were serving these churches.

The Calvary Holiness association is not affiliated with any seminary, bible college, or higher learning facility. Many bible colleges / seminaries like Heritage (Savannah, Georgia), Ozark Bible Institute (Neosho, Missouri), Free Gospel Bible Institute (Export, Pennsylvania), et al. have supported the association by donating students' time and labor to help facilitate meetings such as Youth Camp, Campmeeting, and Fifth Weekend Services.
