= Jehovah's Witnesses Association of Romania =

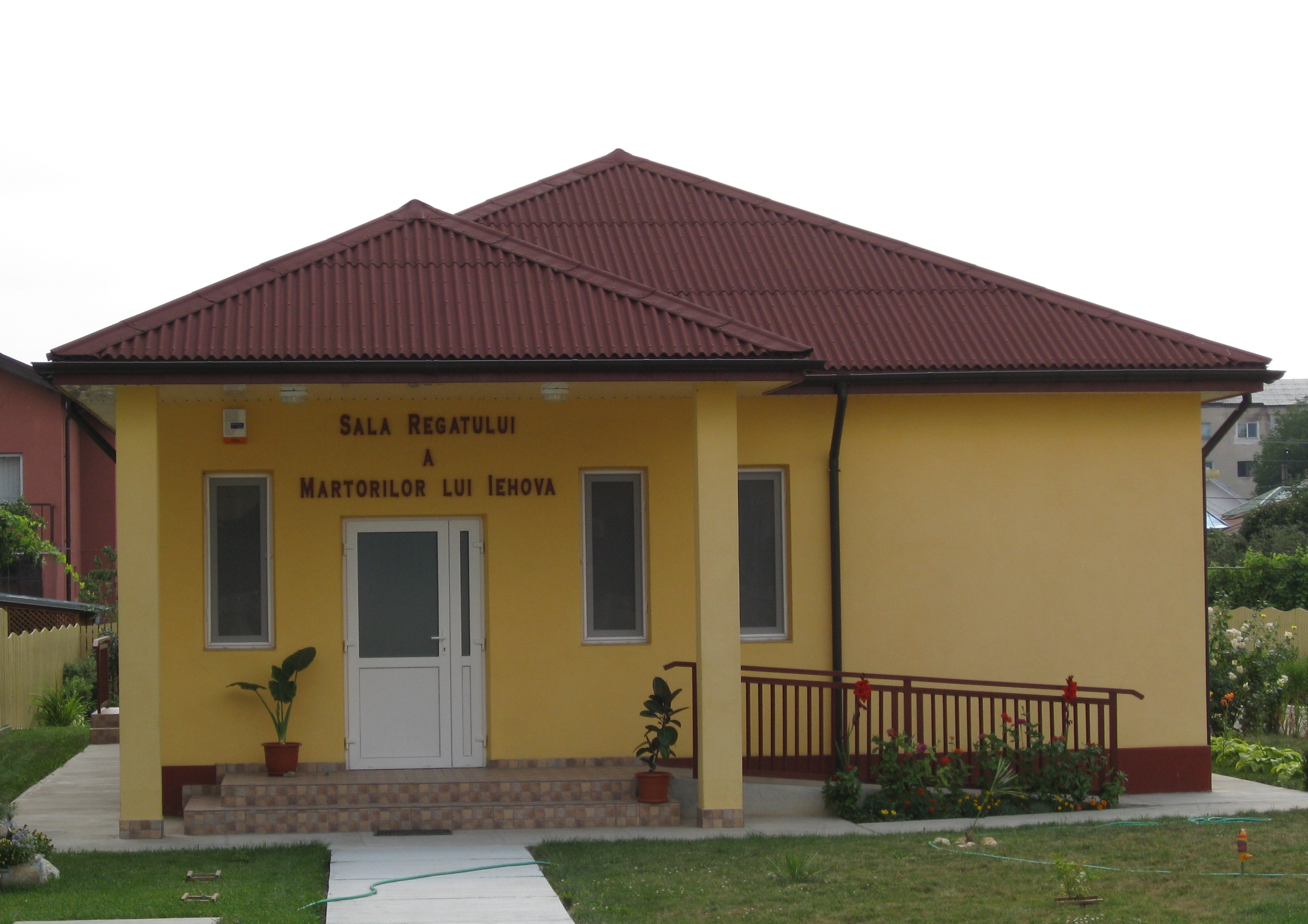
A Kingdom Hall in Târgoviște

Kingdom Hall in Sibiu

Jehovah's Witnesses Association of Romania (Romanian: Organizația Religioasă "Martorii lui Iehova" din România) is the formal name used by Jehovah's Witnesses for their operations in Romania, with a branch office located in Bucharest. It is one of eighteen officially recognised religious denominations in the country. According to a national census held in 2011, it has 49,820 adherents, making it the country's tenth-largest denomination. Each congregation is supervised by a group of elders appointed by the Governing Body of Jehovah's Witnesses. The magazines The Watchtower and Awake! are both published in Romanian.

== History ==
=== Founding and interwar period ===
Bible Student groups first appeared in present-day Romania through Hungarian missionaries in Transylvania. In particular, two emigrants who in 1911 returned from the United States to their hometown of Târgu Mureș (Marosvásárhely) managed to convert local Hungarians to their creed. They published the first edition of The Watchtower in Hungarian in 1914, with the first Romanian version coming out two years later, also in Târgu Mureș. Similar groups were also active in the Romanian Old Kingdom prior to World War I, and there remain groups under the "Bible Student" name in Romania today. In 1920, Ioan B. Sima, a former Greek-Catholic, was sent from the United States to organise the community, which was divided into four groups in the 1930s. After the Union of Transylvania with Romania in 1918, the headquarters moved to Cluj, with the first Watch Tower Society set up there two years later, its congregation mainly Hungarian. The society functioned as a regional hub, coordinating activities for Hungary, Yugoslavia, Bulgaria and Albania. Following a leadership dispute in the Bible Student movement in the United States, those who remained associated with the Watch Tower Society became known as Jehovah's witnesses in 1931.

During the interwar period of Greater Romania the government imposed successive bans on the group's operations. The first came in 1926: the group was considered a deviation from mainstream Christianity and an extra headache for authorities busy dealing with new extremist movements. At that point, The Watchtower was banned, part of a wider move to curtail the group's publications. By the early 1930s, pressure had eased and the headquarters moved to Bucharest, as part of a shift into eastern and southern Romania. Orthodox Ukrainians and Serbs were converted, followed by Romanian Seventh-day Adventists in Moldavia and inroads into Dobruja, Oltenia and Muntenia. The group was legalised again in 1933; its application to register as a joint-stock company claimed 2000 members at the time. The following ban came in 1937, as the rule of King Carol II was sliding into authoritarianism. In the piece of legislation passed to this effect by the Gheorghe Tătărescu cabinet, they were defined as one of the "religious associations and sects" whose activity on Romanian soil was prohibited; the list also included the Pentecostals, the Apostolic Faith Church of God, the Nazarenes, the Old Calendar Orthodox, the Inochentist church and Bible societies.

As a result of their conscientious objection, Jehovah's Witnesses were persecuted during World War II under the Ion Antonescu regime. Meanwhile, the leadership withdrew to Northern Transylvania after the area was ceded to Hungary in 1940. One leader, Martin Magyarosi, was arrested in September 1942, followed later by another, Pamfil Albu. A number of Witnesses from Northern Transylvania were interned in a prison camp in the Serbian town of Bor, alongside Jews and Adventists.

=== Communist era and subsequent developments ===
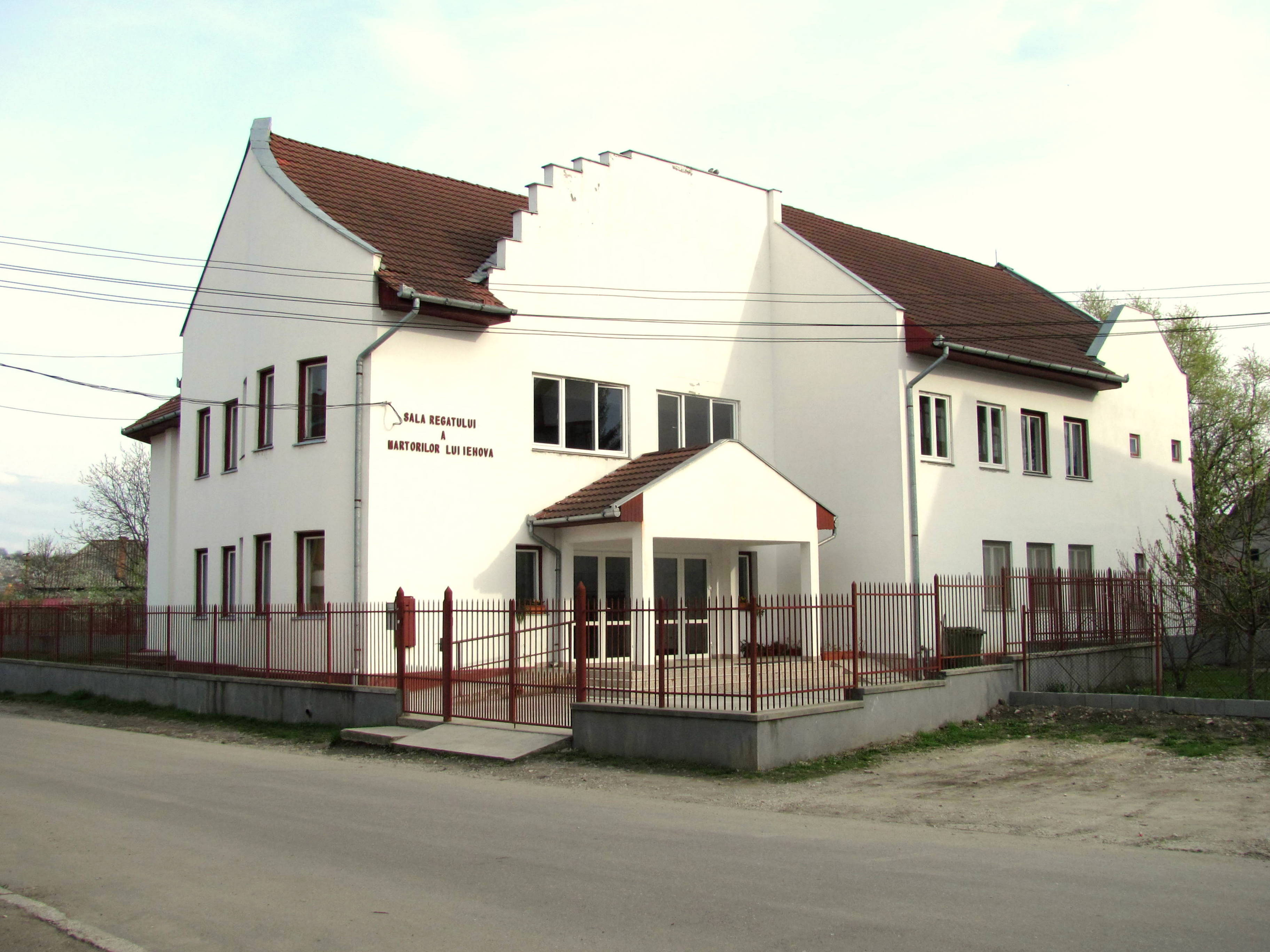
A Kingdom Hall in Turda

After the war ended, the Witnesses reverted to their 1933 status, and were given enhanced protections when they registered as a "legal entity" in July 1945. In 1945–46, the Witnesses were permitted to openly publish their literature in Romanian; however, in 1948, their operations were again banned when the new Romanian Communist regime excluded them from its list of official religious communities; another account places the ban in 1949, by governmental decree. In August of that year, the Bucharest office was closed, its subsidiary buildings and equipment seized. The group presented forthright critiques of ecclesiastical, social and political institutions, as well as apocalyptic pronouncements that were considered subversive by the Communist regime. Even more than their radical millenarianism, their opposition to military service and what officials understood as the Witnesses' attitude to the Romanian state were also considered unacceptable. Stories claiming that Jehovah's Witnesses were prepared to become personally involved in overcoming the powers of darkness and to bring to a consummation the climactic eschatological moment were circulated, increasing pressure on the group. Its close ties to the United States also proved problematic, with members accused of espionage on behalf of the Cold War superpower. At the time of the ban, the group had some 15,000 members. A number of leaders, as well as ordinary faithful, were imprisoned on charges including public instigation, distribution of banned material and conspiracy against the social order, as well as draft evasion. Among those arrested were the leadership; Albu, Magyarosi and Petre Ranca were convicted of spying on behalf of an "Anglo-American network".

Officials maintained close surveillance of the Witness community, subjected its members to intense harassment and discrimination, and deprived them of their civil rights on various occasions. The media and other methods were also employed against the Witnesses. Religious scholar Earl A. Pope cites an American report which stated that in 1975 there were "heavy persecutions" in a number of major cities, including brutal beatings, continuous questioning in excess of fifty hours at a time, and physical torture, as well as many hundreds of house searches throughout the country and seizure of religious literature. However, repression began to diminish somewhat at that point, although sentences for draft evasion continued to be pronounced. The Governing Body tried to negotiate with the Romanian government, but their communications were unanswered. No precise figures are available as to the size of the movement under Communism, but it was large enough to create considerable apprehension for officials. It is estimated there were 17,000 adherents in 1989.

While repressive measures were relaxed starting in the mid-1970s, gaining new converts proved difficult. One method involved members traveling in pairs by train, starting a conversation on religious topics and beginning to proselytize after gaining the interest of others in their compartment. Another strategy was to start religious discussions in cemeteries or in crowded areas like rail and bus stations. The Watchtower was sent into Romania in English, translated by Witnesses into Romanian, the manuscript sent into Austria and copies then brought back into Romania, distributed to members and used in conversion efforts. According to British political scientist Tom Gallagher, by the 1980s, one source of converts to the Witnesses, as well as to Protestant denominations, was the new working class housed in urban high-rise settlements, as the Orthodox hierarchy was reluctant to take care of this group's religious needs. In an interview with the World Council of Churches' official magazine, Metropolitan Antonie Plămădeală of the dominant Romanian Orthodox Church said that gaining official recognition would have been very difficult for Jehovah's Witnesses in Romania because of their attitude toward the Communist state and to military service, but it would not have been impossible if the state had better understood their views and been less paranoid. He claimed that if they kept a low profile and were not active against the state, the authorities would be unconcerned about them.

Following the Romanian Revolution of 1989, Jehovah's Witnesses in Romania received legal status as a religious association on April 9, 1990. That year, their first congresses took place at Brașov and then Bucharest, resulting in the baptism of 1500 new members; they claimed 35,000 adherents by 1996. Since its legalization, opposition has come from the Orthodox Church, which considers the group to be a heretical sect that employs "aggressive proselytism". In July 1996, the Orthodox Church influenced the authorities to cancel a planned international convention of Jehovah's Witnesses that had been scheduled to take place in Bucharest in July 1996. In 1997, at a time when they were encountering difficulty obtaining authorization for new buildings and cemeteries, the Ministry of Culture and Religious Affairs rejected a request for the Witnesses' recognition as a religious denomination. In 2000, fourteen young members were involved in cases before the military authorities, having refused both obligatory army service and two years of community service in exchange for a year of conscription duty. They received suspended prison sentences, drawing condemnation from Amnesty International, but these were subsequently annulled by the Supreme Court of Justice. Pursuant to a ruling by the same court in 2000, the Culture Ministry granted the group official recognition in 2003, making it the first denomination to be recognised since the aftermath of the Revolution. As of 2012, there were an estimated 300 Kingdom Halls serving some 500 congregations; the group claimed 100,000 members that year, of whom 20,000 were living abroad. The census held the prior year, the country's first to record Witnesses, found 49,820 adherents or 0.26% of the population for whom data were available. The highest numbers were found in the counties of Mureș (6981), Maramureș (5960), Cluj (5783), Satu Mare (3841) and Brașov (2455), all in Transylvania.
