= Christian perfection =

Christian process of achieving spiritual perfection

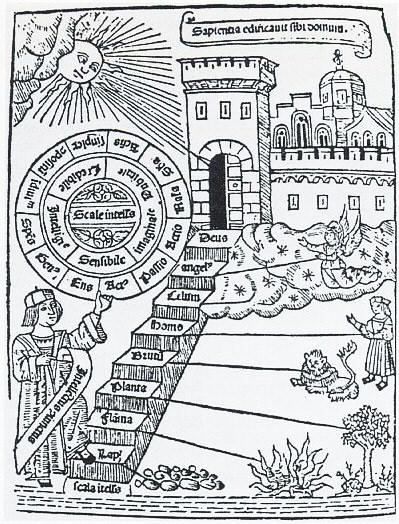
The mediaeval scala naturae as a staircase, implying the possibility of progress: Ramon Llull's Ladder of Ascent and Descent of the Mind, 1305

Within many denominations of Christianity, Christian perfection is the theological concept of the process or the event of achieving spiritual maturity or perfection. The ultimate goal of this process is union with God characterized by pure love of God and other people as well as personal holiness or sanctification. Terms used synonymously with Christian perfection include entire sanctification, holiness, perfect love, the baptism with the Holy Spirit, the indwelling of the Holy Spirit, baptism with fire, the second blessing, and the second work of grace.

Understandings of the doctrine of Christian perfection vary widely between Christian traditions, though these denominational interpretations find basis in Jesus' words recorded in Matthew 5:48: "Be ye therefore perfect, even as your Father which is in heaven is perfect" (King James Version).

The Catholic Church teaches that Christian perfection is to be sought after by all of the just (righteous). Eastern Orthodoxy situates Christian perfection as a goal for all Christians. Traditional Quakerism uses the term perfection and teaches that it is the calling of a believer.

Perfection is a prominent doctrine within the Methodist tradition, in which it is referred to as Christian perfection, entire sanctification, holiness, baptism of the Holy Spirit, and the second work of grace. Holiness Pentecostalism inherited the same terminology from Methodism, with exception of the fact that Holiness Pentecostals take the term Baptism with the Holy Spirit to mean a separate third work of grace of empowerment evidenced by speaking in tongues, whereas Methodists use the term Baptism of the Holy Spirit to refer to the second work of grace, entire sanctification.

Other denominations, such as the Lutheran churches and Reformed churches, reject the possibility of Christian perfection in this life as contrary to the doctrine of salvation by faith alone, holding that deliverance from sin is begun at conversion but is only completed in glorification. Contrasting to all, Christian Science teaches that as man is made in God's image and likeness (Genesis 1:27), "The great spiritual fact must be brought out that man is, not shall be, perfect and immortal".

== Terminology ==
The terms "perfect" and "perfection" are drawn from the Greek teleios and teleiōsis, respectively. The root word, telos, means an "end" or "goal". In recent translations, teleios and teleiōsis are often rendered as "mature" and "maturity", respectively, so as not to imply an absolute perfection of no defects. But the words "mature" and "maturity" do not capture the full meaning of "end" or "goal". (Even these recent translations use the word "perfect" when not referring to people, as in James 1:17). In the Christian tradition, teleiōsis has also referred to personal wholeness or health, an unswerving commitment to the goal.

== Church Fathers and Medieval Theologians ==
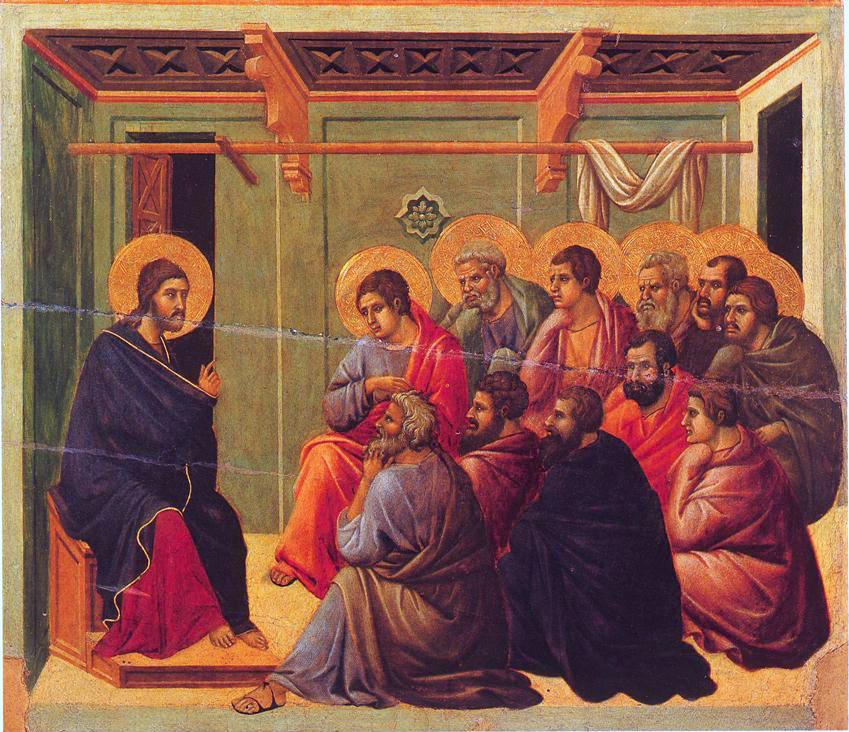
In the Farewell Discourse Jesus promised to send the Holy Spirit to his disciples after his departure; depiction from the Maesta by Duccio, 1308–1311.

The roots of the doctrine of Christian perfection lie in the writings of some early theologians considered Church Fathers: Irenaeus, Clement of Alexandria, Origen and later Macarius of Egypt and Gregory of Nyssa.

Irenaeus wrote about the spiritual transformation that occurred in the believer as the Holy Spirit is to "fit us for God." In antiquity, baptism was commonly referred to as the perfecting of the Christian. This view was expressed by Clement of Alexandria in his work Paedagogus: "Being baptized, we are illuminated; illuminated we become children [lit. 'sons']; being made children, we are made perfect; being made perfect, we are immortal." In another work, the Stromata, Clement discussed three stages in Christian life that led to a more mature perfection. The first stage was marked by the change from heathenism to faith and initiation into the Christian religion. The second stage was marked by a deeper knowledge of God that resulted in continuing repentance from sin and mastery over the passions (apatheia). The third stage led to contemplation and agape love. Origen also proposed his own stages of spiritual ascent beginning with conversion and ending with perfect union with God in love.

Gregory of Nyssa defined human perfection as "constant growth in the good". For Gregory, this was brought about by the work of the Holy Spirit and the self-discipline of the Christian. Macarius of Egypt taught that all sin could be washed away and that a person could be made perfect in the "span of an hour" while stressing the fact that entire sanctification had a two-fold nature, as "an act and a process". Pseudo-Macarius taught that inner sin was rooted out of the pure in heart, but he also warned against the hidden potential for sin in everyone so that no one should ever say, "Because I am in grace, I am thoroughly freed from sin."

By the 4th century, the pursuit of the life of perfection was identified with asceticism, especially monasticism and withdrawal from the world. In the 12th century, Bernard of Clairvaux developed the idea of the ladder of love in his treatise, On the Love of God. This ladder had four rungs or degrees. The first and lowest degree was love of self for self. The second degree was love of God for what he gives. The third degree was love of God for his own sake; it would not be difficult, according to Bernard, for those who truly loved God to keep his commandments. The fourth degree was love of self only for God's sake; it was believed that this degree of perfection in love was only rarely achieved before death.

Thomas Aquinas wrote of three possible levels of perfection. The first, absolute perfection, is where God is loved as much as he can be loved; only God himself can be this perfect. The second level, where love for God fills a person constantly, is possible after death but not in life. The lowest level of perfection was thought to be possible to achieve while living. Theologian Thomas Noble described Aquinas' view of this level of perfection as follows:

All Christians have the grace of caritas infused into them at baptism and this love for God excludes all mortal sins. Such sins are not impossible, and, if committed, require the grace of penance, but Christians do not live committing flagrant acts of intentional sin contrary to their love for God. That is incompatible with the state of grace. But those who are no longer beginners, but making progress in the life of perfection, come to the point where everything contrary to being wholly in love with God is excluded: they love God with all their hearts.

According to the standard formulation of the process of Christian perfection, as formulated by Dionysius the Pseudo-Areopagite (late 5th to early 6th century), there are three stages:

- Katharsis or purification;
- Theoria or illumination, also called "natural" or "acquired contemplation;"
- Union or Theosis; also called "infused" or "higher contemplation"; indwelling in God; vision of God; deification; union with God

Daniel L. Burnett, a professor at Wesley Biblical Seminary, writes that:

Views compatible with the Wesleyan understanding of entire sanctification were carried forward in later times by men like the medieval Catholic priest Thomas a Kempis, the Protestant Reformers Caspel Schwenkfeld and Thomas Munzer, the Dutch theologian Jacobus Arminius, the German Pietist Phillip Jacob Spener, the Quaker founder George Fox, the Anglican bishop Jeremy Taylor, and the English devotional writer William Law. Many of these influences fed into [John] Wesley's heritage and laid the foundation for the development of his thought. In fact, the concept of entire sanctification is so pervasive throughout church history that it can accurately be said that virtually all the major traditions—Orthodox, Catholic, Reformed, and Anglican—played some part in shaping Wesley's passion for holiness.

== Catholic teaching ==
According to the teaching of the Catholic Church, something is perfect when nothing is lacking in its nature or purpose. The ultimate purpose of Man is union with God, also called divinization. This is accomplished on earth by grace and in heaven by the beatific vision. Perfect union with God while on earth is impossible; therefore, absolute perfection is reserved for heaven.

The Catholic Church teaches that Christian perfection is a spiritual union with God that is attainable in this life. It is not absolute perfection as it exists alongside human misery, rebellious passions, and venial sin. Christian perfection consists of charity or love, since it is this virtue that unites the soul to God. It is not just the possession and preservation of sanctifying grace, since perfection is determined by one's action—the actual practicing of charity or the service of God.

The more charity a person possesses, the greater the perfection of the soul. A person who is perfect in so far as being free from mortal sin obtains salvation and can be called just, holy, and perfect. A person who is perfect insofar as also being free from venial sin and all affections which separate a person from God is in a state of active service and love of God. This is the perfect fulfillment of the law—loving God and loving other people.

The Catholic Church teaches that Christian perfection is something all should pursue in light of Jesus' injunction in Matthew 5:48. There is also, however, what is called "religious perfection", which is pursued by those committed to living religious life, such as members of religious orders. All Catholics are obliged to attain perfection by observing the commandments, but religious life imposes a more exacting obligation, requiring the religious to also observe the evangelical counsels (also known as "counsels of perfection") of poverty, chastity, and obedience. The evangelical counsels are believed to promote perfection in two ways. They remove the obstacles to perfection—lust of the eyes, lust of the flesh, and the pride of life. They also increase a person's love of God by freeing the affections from earthly ties.

El Camino de Perfección is a method for making progress in the contemplative life written by Saint Teresa of Ávila for the sisters of her reformed convent of the Discalced Carmelites. St. Teresa was a major figure of the Counter-Reformation in 16th century Spain. Christian Perfection is also the title of a book written by theologian Réginald Garrigou-Lagrange. Perfectae Caritatis, the Decree on the Adaptation and Renewal of Religious Life, is one of the shorter documents issued by the Second Vatican Council. Approved by vote of 2,321 to 4 of the bishops assembled at the council, the decree was promulgated by Pope Paul VI on October 28, 1965. As is customary for Church documents, the title is taken from the Latin incipit of the decree: "Of Perfect Charity".

== Eastern Orthodox teaching ==
The Orthodox Church teaches that "perfection is possible for us as human beings as long as we understand it in its proper, dynamic sense" and that humans are "made for Theosis, for the deification ('divinizing') of the totality of our being, body, mind, heart, and soul". This is in accordance with the writings of Saint Paul that encourage Christians to seek after the righteousness of Jesus to be transformed from "one degree of glory to another".

Byzantine Orthodox hagiographer and hymnodist St Symeon the Metaphrast (10th c.) declared:

Those who deny the possibility of perfection inflict the greatest damage on the soul in three ways. First, they manifestly disbelieve the inspired Scriptures. Then, because they do not make the greatest and fullest goal of Christianity their own, and so do not aspire to attain it, they can have no longing and diligence, no hunger and thirst for righteousness (cf Matt. 5:6); on the contrary, content with outward show and behavior and with minor accomplishments of this kind, they abandon that blessed expectation together with the pursuit of perfection and of the total purification of the passions. Third, thinking they have reached the goal when they have acquired a few virtues, and not pressing on to the true goal, not only are they incapable of having any humility, poverty and contrition of heart but, justifying themselves on the grounds that they have already arrived, they make no efforts to progress and grow day by day. People who think it is impossible to attain through the Spirit the 'new creation' of the pure heart (cf 2 Cor. 5:17) are rightly and explicitly likened by the apostle to those who, because of their unbelief, were found unworthy of entering the promised land and whose bodies on that account 'were left lying in the desert' (Heb. 3:17).

== Anabaptist teaching ==
Anabaptist Christians (inclusive of the Mennonite, Amish, Hutterite, Bruderhof, Schwarzenau Brethren, River Brethren and Apostolic Christian denominations) believe that "because they have voluntarily chosen to follow Christ as their only authority", they can be successful in their pursuit of Christian perfection. Professor of Religious Studies Ira Chernus explicates Anabaptist doctrine:

... Anabaptists put special stress on the power of faith to produce good works and a more moral life. ... they are guided by the concluding injunction of the Sermon on the Mount: "You shall be perfect, as your Heavenly Father is perfect." They strive for perfection; they view their church as the visible body of Christ, which must be, and can be, a "spotless congregation." As one of their greatest early leaders, Menno Simmons, said: "The reborn willfully here sin no more."

In particular, the Apostolic Christian Church is "distinguished by its emphasis on entire sanctification".

== Wesleyan teaching ==
=== John Wesley ===
In traditional Calvinism, including that manifested in historic Anglicanism, perfection was viewed as a gift bestowed on righteous persons only after their death (see Glorification). John Wesley, the founder of Methodism, was responsible for reviving the idea of spiritual perfection in Protestantism. Wesley's views were elaborated in A Plain Account of Christian Perfection, published in 1777.

According to Noble, Wesley transformed Christian perfection as found in church tradition by interpreting it through a Protestant lens that understood sanctification in light of justification by grace through faith working by love. Wesley believed that regeneration (or the new birth), which occurred simultaneously with justification, was the beginning of sanctification. From his reading of Romans 6 and 1 John 3:9, Wesley concluded that a consequence of the new birth was power over sin. In a sermon titled "Christian Perfection", Wesley preached that "A Christian is so far perfect as not to commit sin."

"The term 'sinless perfection' was one which Wesley never used because of its ambiguity." John William Fletcher, an early Methodist divine whom John Wesley chose to lead the Methodist movement if he died, clarified the Wesleyan doctrine by stating "that the doctrine of an evangelically sinless perfection is truly Scriptural." And "I say evangelically sinless, because, without the word evangelically, the phrase "sinless perfection" gives an occasion of cavilling to those who seek it." Methodists are able to hold this doctrine based upon Wesley's definition of actual sin:

Nothing is sin, strictly speaking, but a voluntary transgression of a known law of God. Therefore, every voluntary breach of the law of love is sin; and nothing else, if we speak properly. To strain the matter farther is only to make way for Calvinism. There may be ten thousand wandering thoughts, and forgetful intervals, without any breach of love, though not without transgressing the Adamic law. But Calvinists would fain confound these together. Let love fill your heart, and it is enough!

Involuntary transgressions (such as those arising from ignorance, error, and evil tempers), according to Wesley, were not properly called sins. Therefore, regenerated Christians would continue to be guilty of involuntary transgressions and would need to practice regular confession. Furthermore, Christians continued to face temptation, and Wesley acknowledged that it was possible for a regenerated Christian to commit voluntary sin (if, in the words of Noble, the Christian ceased "actively trusting in God through Christ and living in the divine presence"), which would also necessitate confession of sin.

The power over sin received at regeneration was just the lowest stage of Christian perfection according to Wesley. Based on 1 John 2, Wesley proposed three stages in the Christian life: little children, young men, and finally fathers. Young men were defined as those who had experienced victory over temptation and evil thoughts. Fathers were defined as mature Christians who were filled with the love of God.

Wesley believed this last stage of Christian maturity was made possible by what he called entire sanctification (a phrase derived from First Thessalonians 5:23). In Wesley's theology, entire sanctification was a second work of grace received by faith that removed inbred or original sin, and this allowed the Christian to enter a state of perfect love—"Love excluding sin" as stated in the sermon "The Scripture Way of Salvation". Wesley described it as having "purity of intention", "dedicating all the life to God", "loving God with all our heart", and as being the "renewal of the heart in the whole image of God". A life of perfect love meant living in a way that was centered on loving God and one's neighbor. As such, Wesley taught that the manifestation of being entirely sanctified included engagement in works of piety and works of mercy. In his Sermon called "The Circumcision of the Heart" Wesley described it like this:

It is that habitual disposition of soul which, in the sacred writings, is termed holiness; and which directly implies, the being cleansed from sin, "from all filthiness both of flesh and spirit;" and, by consequence, the being endued with those virtues which were also in Christ Jesus; the being so "renewed in the spirit of our mind," as to be perfect as our Father in heaven is perfect."

Even this was not an absolute perfection. The entirely sanctified Christian was perfect in love, meaning that the heart is undivided in its love for God or that it loves nothing that conflicts with its love for God. Christians perfected in love were still subject to conditions of the Fall and liable to commit unintentional transgressions. In consequence, these Christians still had to depend on forgiveness through Christ's atonement. However, with Wesley's concept of sin, he did believe in freedom from sin. In fact, he described it like this: "Certainly sanctification (in the proper sense) is "an instantaneous deliverance from all sin;" and includes "an instantaneous power then given".

Wesley's concept of Christian perfection had both gradual and instantaneous elements. In his 1765 sermon "The Scripture Way of Salvation", Wesley emphasized the instantaneous side, stating, "Do you believe we are sanctified by faith? Be true, then, to your principle and look for this blessing just as you are, neither better nor worse; as a poor sinner that has still nothing to pay, nothing to plead but 'Christ died'. And if you look for it as you are, then expect it now."

In "Thoughts on Christian Perfection" (1759), Wesley stressed the gradual aspect of perfection, writing that it was to be received "in a zealous keeping of all the commandments; in watchfulness and painfulness; in denying ourselves and taking up our cross daily; as well as in earnest prayer and fasting and a close attendance on all the ordinances of God ...it is true we receive it by simple faith; but God does not, will not, give that faith unless we seek it with all diligence in the way which he hath ordained." Wesley taught that Christians should "groan after holiness", which the theologian L.S. Boardman termed "death-route entire sanctification". In addition, Wesley also believed that Christian perfection, once received, might be forfeited. The systematic theologian of Methodism, John William Fletcher, termed the reception of entire sanctification as Baptism with the Holy Spirit. Fletcher emphasized that the experience of entire sanctification, through the indwelling of the Holy Spirit, cleanses the believer from original sin and empowers the believer for service to God.

John Wesley taught outward holiness as an expression of "inward transformation" and theologians in the Wesleyan Methodist tradition have noted that the observance of standards of dress and behaviour should follow the New Birth as an act of obedience to God.

=== Mainline Methodism ===
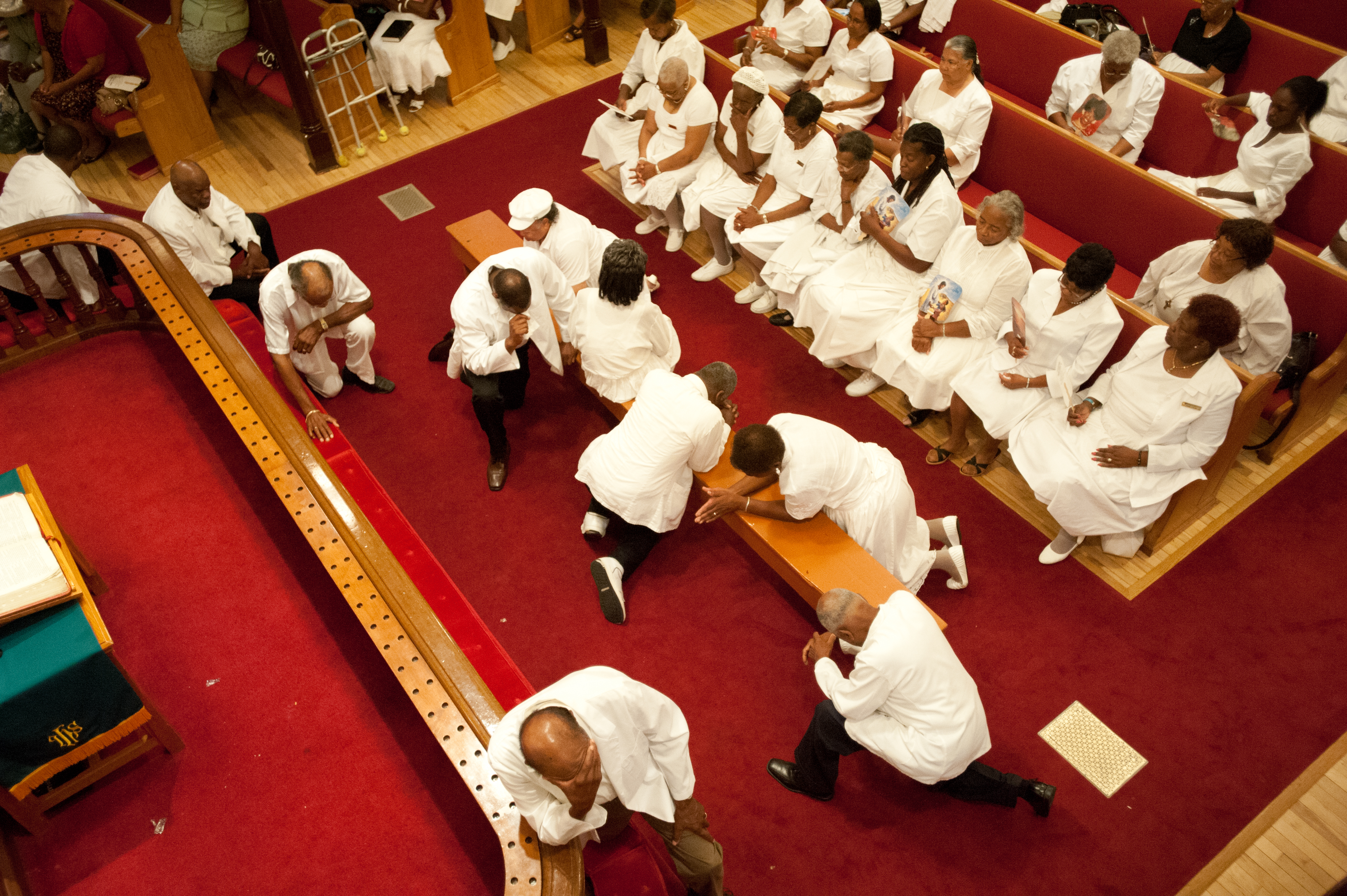
Methodists often seek the new birth and entire sanctification at the mourners' bench or chancel rails during services held in local churches, tent revivals and camp meetings (pictured are people praying at Mount Zion United Methodist Church in Pasadena, Maryland).

Calling it "the grand depositum" of the Methodist faith, Wesley specifically taught that the propagation of the doctrine of entire sanctification to the rest of Christendom was the main reason that God raised up the Methodists in the world. Methodists taught that through entire sanctification, the heart was made perfect in love and original sin was eradicated. After Wesley's death, his teachings on Christian perfection remained important to the Methodist church, but, according to historian David Bebbington, "the tradition fell into decay." As later generations of Methodists sought greater respectability in the eyes of other Christian denominations, some turned to "a watered-down version" of the doctrine outlined by William Arthur (who served as Secretary of the Wesleyan Methodist Missionary Society) in his popular work The Tongue of Fire, published in 1856. While Arthur encouraged readers to pray for a greater experience of the Holy Spirit, he de-emphasized the instantaneous aspect of Christian perfection. According to Bebbington, this eliminated the distinctiveness of Wesleyan entire sanctification, and by the 1860s, the idea that Christian perfection was a decisive second blessing or stage in Christian sanctification had fallen out of favor among some Methodists, though not all Methodists, as academic institutions affiliated with mainline Methodism such as Asbury Theological Seminary, Methodist camp meetings, and other Holiness Methodist associations within the Church continued to be a beacon for the holiness movement.

In contemporary Methodist churches, Christian perfection remains official doctrine and both its gradual and instantaneous aspects are recognized. A Catechism for the Use of the People Called Methodists teaches:

Through the Holy Spirit God has given us His love so that we may love Him in return with all our heart, soul, mind and strength, and our neighbour as ourselves. This is a gift offered to all Christians, and by responding we affirm that there is no limit to what the grace of God is able to do in a human life. By giving us the Holy Spirit, God assures us of His love for us and enables us to love as He, in Christ, loves us. When God's love is perfected in us, we so represent Christ to our neighbours that they see Him in us without hindrance from us. Perfect love, as Christian perfection is often called, is the result of, and can only be maintained by, complete dependence on Jesus Christ. It is given either gradually or at one moment...

Candidates for ordination are asked the following question, "Do you expect to be made perfect in love in this life?" In the Methodist Church of Great Britain, the distinctive Wesleyan teachings are summed up in the phrase "All need to be saved; all can be saved; all can know they are saved; all can be saved to the uttermost" (the word "uttermost" referring to Christian perfection).

The Confession of Faith, one of the Doctrinal Standards of the Global Methodist Church and the United Methodist Church, teaches that entire sanctification may be bestowed upon the believer gradually or instantaneously:

We believe sanctification is the work of God's grace through the Word and the Spirit, by which those who have been born again are cleansed from sin in their thoughts, words and acts, and are enabled to live in accordance with God's will, and to strive for holiness without which no one will see the Lord.

Entire sanctification is a state of perfect love, righteousness and true holiness which every regenerate believer may obtain by being delivered from the power of sin, by loving God with all the heart, soul, mind and strength, and by loving one's neighbor as one's self. Through faith in Jesus Christ this gracious gift may be received in this life both gradually and instantaneously, and should be sought earnestly by every child of God.

We believe this experience does not deliver us from the infirmities, ignorance, and mistakes common to man, nor from the possibilities of further sin. The Christian must continue on guard against spiritual pride and seek to gain victory over every temptation to sin. He must respond wholly to the will of God so that sin will lose its power over him; and the world, the flesh, and the devil are put under his feet. Thus he rules over these enemies with watchfulness through the power of the Holy Spirit.

James Heidinger II, former president of the Good News movement, an evangelical caucus within the United Methodist Church, has emphasized the significance of the doctrine of entire sanctification within Methodism: "There is no question about the importance of the doctrine of perfection in the history of Methodism. Wesley believed that this emphasis was a peculiar heritage given to the Methodists in trust for the whole Church." However, he has also noted that uncertainty, among some, exists within the denomination over the teaching: "Our discomfort with this doctrine today is seen in services of ordination when candidates are asked, 'Are you going on to perfection?' Our misunderstanding about this often brings uneasy chuckles and quick disclaimers that we certainly don't claim to be 'perfect' in our Christian life." Brian Beck, former President of the Methodist Conference in Britain, expressed his personal opinion in 2000 that "The doctrine [of sanctification] remains with us in Charles Wesley's hymns, but the formative framework, and even, I suspect, the spiritual intention, have largely gone." Writing on the need for improved spiritual formation within the British Methodist Church and the US-based United Methodist Church, Methodist theologian Randy L. Maddox commented that the terms "holiness of heart and life" and "Christian Perfection" were considered "prone to moralistic, static and unrealistic connotations, resulting in the growing uncomfortableness with and neglect of this aspect of our Wesleyan heritage." The Rev. Dr. Kevin M. Watson, a United Methodist clergyman and Assistant Professor of Historical Theology and Wesleyan Studies at Seattle Pacific University, implores fellow pastors: "Teaching and preaching the possibility of being made perfect in love for God and neighbor, and seeking to actually become entirely sanctified are the reasons Methodism was 'raised up.' May we remember who we are and why the Holy Spirit brought us to life."

The Global Methodist Church enshrines the doctrine of entire sanctification in its official catechism, teaching that "Entire sanctification is a state of perfect love, righteousness, and true holiness which every regenerate believer may obtain." It teaches that Christian perfection may be "received in this life either gradually or instantaneously" and that it should be "sought earnestly by every child of God." In order to maintain this state of holiness, the believer must "respond wholly to the will of God so that sin will lose its power over us; and the world, the flesh, and the devil are put under our feet."

For John Wesley, the preaching of Christian perfection was crucial to the spiritual health of a Methodist church: he taught that "Where Christian perfection is not strongly and explicitly preached, there is seldom any remarkable blessing from God; and consequently little addition to the society, and little life in the members of it." As such, he urged ministers: "Till you press the believers to expect full salvation [entire sanctification] now, you must not look for any revival."

=== Holiness movement ===
In the 19th century, there were Methodists who sought to revitalize the doctrine of Christian perfection or holiness, which had, in the words of religion scholar Randall Balmer, "faded into the background" as mainline Methodists gained respectability and became solidly middle class. While it originated as a revival movement within the Methodist Episcopal Church and many adherents of the holiness movement remained within mainline Methodism, the holiness movement grew to be interdenominational and gave rise to a number of Wesleyan-holiness denominations, including the Free Methodist Church, Church of the Nazarene, the Church of God (Anderson, Indiana), The Salvation Army, and the Wesleyan Methodist Church.

An early promoter of holiness was American Methodist Phoebe Palmer. Through her evangelism and writings, Palmer articulated an "altar theology" that outlined a "shorter way" to entire sanctification, achieved through placing oneself on a metaphorical altar by sacrificing worldly desires. As long as the Christian placed themselves on the altar and had faith that it was God's will to accomplish sanctification, the Christian could be assured that God would sanctify them. In the words of historian Jeffrey Williams, "Palmer made sanctification an instantaneous act accomplished through the exercise of faith." Many holiness denominations require pastors to profess that they have already experienced entire sanctification. This emphasis on the instantaneous nature of Christian perfection rather than its gradual side is a defining feature of the Wesleyan-holiness movement. The Discipline of the Bible Methodist Connection of Churches thus teaches that:

We believe that entire sanctification is that work of the Holy Spirit by which the child of God is cleansed from inherited depravity and empowered for more effective service through faith in Jesus Christ. It is subsequent to regeneration and is accomplished in a moment of time when the believer presents himself a living sacrifice, holy and acceptable unto God. The Spirit-filled believer is thus enabled to love God with an undivided heart.

A second defining emphasis of the Holiness movement is the complete destruction and eradication of the sinful nature. H. Orton Wiley, the premier Holiness systematic theologian, quotes R. T. Williams explaining:

It is folly to try to pass as a believer in holiness and at the same time question its doctrine of eradication. There cannot be such a thing as holiness in its final analysis without the eradication of sin. Holiness and suppression are incompatible terms. "The old man" and counteraction make a pale and sickly kind of holiness doctrine. It is holiness and eradication or holiness not at all.

Another key aspect of the Holiness movement is their close adherence to Wesley's definition of sin. Wesley stated in a letter:

Nothing is sin, strictly speaking, but a voluntary transgression of a known law of God. Therefore, every voluntary breach of the law of love is sin; and nothing else, if we speak properly. To strain the matter farther is only to make way for Calvinism. There may be ten thousand wandering thoughts, and forgetful intervals, without any breach of love, though not without transgressing the Adamic law. But Calvinists would fain confound these together. Let love fill your heart, and it is enough!

With this understanding of sin, clergy aligned with the holiness movement teach the possibility of complete freedom from all sin, both inward and outward, as expressed by John Fletcher's statement "He who is possessed of love, is free from all sin."

=== Holiness Pentecostalism ===
Holiness Pentecostal denominations, also known as Wesleyan Pentecostals or Methodistic Pentecostals, are Pentecostals that believe in entire sanctification as a second work of grace. Inheriting Wesleyan–Arminian theology from the holiness movement within Methodism, Holiness Pentecostals are the original branch of Pentecostalism, and these denominations include the Apostolic Faith Church, (Note: The Apostolic Faith Church is one of the original denominations of Holiness Pentecostalism that emerged from the Azusa Street Revival.) the Calvary Holiness Association, the Congregational Holiness Church, the Free Gospel Church, the International Pentecostal Holiness Church, the Church of God (Cleveland), the Church of God in Christ and The (Original) Church of God; the Heritage Bible College is a Bible college that trains many Holiness Pentecostal clergy. In the United States, major Holiness Pentecostal camp meetings include the Portland AFC Camp Meeting (Portland, Oregon), Blanchard Holiness Camp Meeting (Blanchard, OK), Dripping Springs Holiness Camp Meeting (Glenwood, Arkansas) and Muldrow Holiness Camp Meeting (Muldrow, OK). For Holiness Pentecostals, entire sanctification is the second work of grace in a series of three distinct blessings that Christians experience. The first work of grace is conversion (the new birth) and the third work of grace is the baptism in the Holy Spirit (which is marked by speaking in tongues). Methodism (inclusive of the holiness movement) teaches two works of grace—the New Birth and Entire Sanctification, while Holiness Pentecostals add a third work of grace, Baptism in the Holy Spirit evidenced by speaking in tongues, to this sequence (in contrast, in Methodism, baptism with the Holy Spirit refers to entire sanctification). According to church historian and theologian Ted A. Campbell, this three-part pattern is often explained by stating "Holy Spirit cannot fill an unclean vessel", so the cleansing of the heart that takes place in entire sanctification is necessary before a person can be filled or baptized with the Holy Spirit. The testimony of those who attended the Azusa Street Revival was "I am saved, sanctified, and filled with the Holy Ghost" in reference to the three works of grace of Holiness Pentecostals, the oldest branch of Pentecostalism. In contrast, Finished Work Pentecostal denominations, such as the Assemblies of God, reject the doctrine of entire sanctification.

== Quaker teaching ==
George Fox, the founder of Quakerism, taught Christian perfection, also known in the Friends tradition as "perfection", in which the Christian believer could be made free from sin. In his Some Principles of the Elect People of God Who in Scorn are called Quakers, for all the People throughout all Christendome to Read over, and thereby their own States to Consider, he writes in section "XVI. Concerning Perfection":

HE that hath brought Man into Imperfection is the Devil, and his work who led from God; for Man was Perfect before he fell, for all God's Works are Perfect; So Christ that destroyes the Devil and his works, makes man Perfect again, destroying him that made him Imperfect, which the Law could not do; so by his Blood doth he cleanse from all Sin; And by one offering, hath he Perfected for ever them that are Sanctified; And they that do not Believe in the Light which comes from Christ, by which they might see the Offering, and receive the Blood, are in the unbelief concerning this. And the Apostles that were in the Light, Christ Jesus, (which destroyes the Devil and his works) spoke Wisdom among them that were Perfect, though they could not among those that were Carnal; And their Work was for the perfecting of the Saints, for that cause had they their Ministry given to them until they all came to the Knowledge of the Son of God, which doth destroy the Devil and his works, And which ends the Prophets, first Covenant, Types, Figures, Shadowes; And until they all came to the Unity of the Faith which purified their hearts, which gave them Victory over that which separated [sic] from God, In which they had access to God, by which Faith they pleased him, by which they were Justified; And so until they came unto a Perfect Man, unto the Measure of the Stature of the fulness of Christ; and so the Apostle said, Christ in you we Preach the hope of Glory, warning every man, that we might present every Man Perfect in Christ Jesus.

The early Quakers, following Fox, taught that as a result of the New Birth through the power of the Holy Spirit, man could be free from actual sinning if he continued to rely on the inward light and "focus on the cross of Christ as the center of faith". George Fox emphasized "personal responsibility for faith and emancipation from sin" in his teaching on perfection. For the Christian, "perfectionism and freedom from sin were possible in this world".

This traditional Quaker teaching continues to be emphasized by Conservative Friends, such as the Ohio Yearly Meeting of the Religious Society of Friends and Holiness Friends, such as the Central Yearly Meeting of Friends.

The presence of Christian perfection within British Quakers is deeply embedded in their Advices and Queries Book of Discipline, which provide both spiritual guidance and practical applications for living a life aligned with divine principles through continuous reflection and community support with the aim to embody the virtue ethics central to their faith, ultimately fostering a deeper connection with what their founder expressed as "that of God in everyone", in compliance with Romans 1:19 statement "That which may be known of God is manifest in them; for God hath showed it unto them".

== Moravian view ==
The Moravian Church, following the teaching of bishop Nicolaus Zinzendorf, holds that "We are sanctified wholly the moment we are justified, and are neither more nor less holy to the day of our death; entire sanctification and justification being in one and the same instant."

== Keswickian teaching ==
Keswickian theology teaches a second work of grace that occurs through "surrender and faith", in which God keeps an individual from sin. Keswickian denominations, such as the Christian and Missionary Alliance, differ from the Wesleyan-Holiness movement in that the Christian and Missionary Alliance does not see entire sanctification as cleansing one from original sin, whereas holiness denominations espousing the Wesleyan–Arminian theology affirm this belief. (Note: Though the Christian and Missionary Alliance is characterized as Keswickian in theology, it departs from traditional Keswickian views on progressive sanctification and by its rejection of suppressionism.)

== Criticism ==
There are Protestant denominations that reject the possibility of Christian perfection. Lutherans, citing letters by Paul of Tarsus in Romans 7:14–25 and Philippians 3:12, believe that "although we will strive for Christian perfection, we will not attain it in this life." Modern apologists further note that:

Our salvation is complete and is simply received by faith. Good works are the fruit of that faith. Good works show that we are saved, but have no part in saving us. Becoming more and more God-like in this life is the result of being saved. If we are saved by becoming more and more God-like, our salvation is in doubt because our being God-like is never perfect in this life. The troubled conscience will find little comfort in an incomplete process of theosis, but will find much comfort in God's declaration of full and free forgiveness.

While Presbyterians believe that Christians do "grow in God's grace" or holiness as they become conformed to the image of Christ, they reject the notion that perfection is attainable. In their view, sin will continue to affect one's motives and actions. This means that perfection is only attainable in glorification after death.

== See also ==
- Arminianism
- Brotherly love
- Imparted righteousness
- Impeccability
- Perfection
- Perfectionism
- Perfection of Christ
- Realized eschatology
- Sanctification
- Synergism
- Theosis
