= Holiness Pentecostalism =

Branch of Pentecostalism

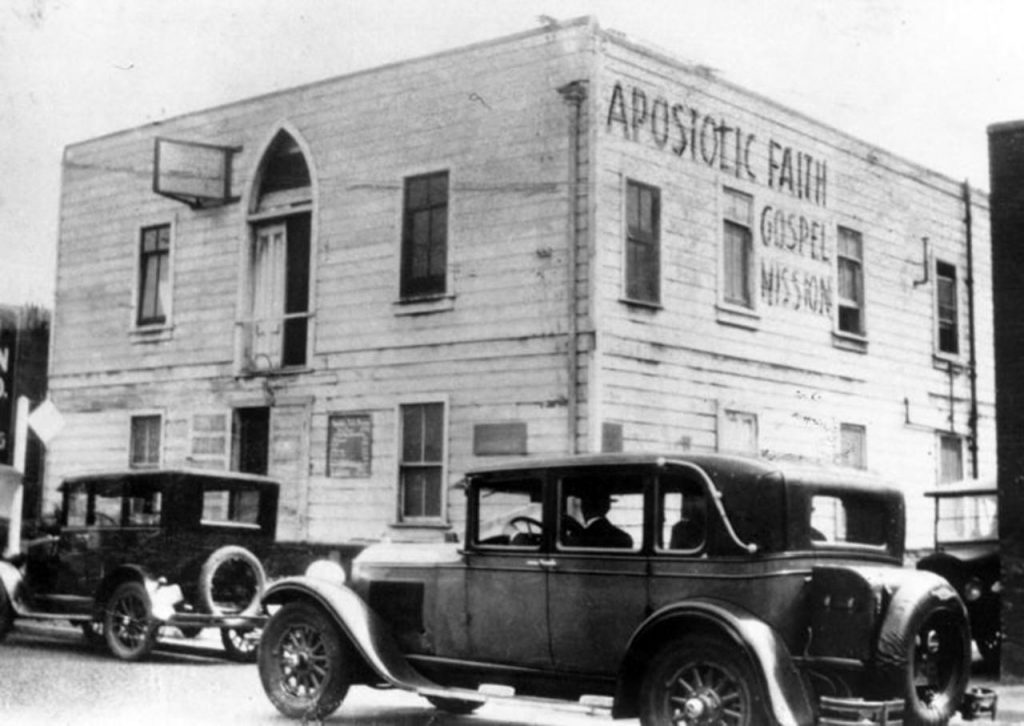
The Azusa Street Revival at the Apostolic Faith Gospel Mission

Holiness Pentecostalism is the original branch of Protestant Christian Pentecostalism, which is characterized by its teaching of three works of grace: [1] the New Birth (first work of grace), [2] entire sanctification (second work of grace), and [3] Spirit baptism evidenced by speaking in tongues (third work of grace). The word Holiness refers specifically to the belief in entire sanctification as an instantaneous, definite second work of grace, in which original sin is cleansed and the believer is made holy, with the heart being made perfect in love.

Holiness Pentecostalism emerged under the work of ministers Charles Fox Parham and William Joseph Seymour, the latter of whom, beginning in 1906, led the Azusa Street Revival at the Apostolic Faith Gospel Mission. The testimony of those who attended the Azusa Street Revival was "I am saved, sanctified, and filled with the Holy Ghost" in reference to the three works of grace taught by Holiness Pentecostals, the oldest branch of Pentecostalism. The relationship between the second work of grace and the third work of grace is explained by Holiness Pentecostals who teach the "Holy Spirit cannot fill an unclean vessel", so the cleansing of the heart that takes place in entire sanctification is necessary before a person can be filled or baptized with the Holy Spirit. Inheriting the Wesleyan-Holiness doctrine, Holiness Pentecostals teach entire sanctification is a definite second work of grace, accomplished in an instantaneous crisis experience, that cleanses the heart of the recipient from all sin; this state of Christian perfection is evidenced by love for God and love for neighbour. Holiness Pentecostals operate within the framework of Wesleyan (Methodist) theology with the exception of the unique doctrine that distinguishes Holiness Pentecostalism: the Parhamian-Seymourian belief in a third work of grace (in contrast, traditional Wesleyan theology affirms two works of grace—the New Birth and entire sanctification). In the theology of Methodism, entire sanctification (second work of grace) is the baptism of the Holy Spirit, while Holiness Pentecostalism holds the baptism of the Holy Spirit to be the third work of grace. Additionally, while Wesleyan theology of the Methodists holds the second work of grace (entire sanctification) to empower the believer to accomplish that which he/she is called by God to do, in contrast, the Parhamian-Seymourian theology of Holiness Pentecostalism teaches that the believer is empowered through the third work of grace. William Joseph Seymour and Florence Crawford published The Apostolic Faith newsletter, which disseminated the teachings of the Holiness Pentecostal movement.

Holiness Pentecostals teach that believers should dress and behave in a manner becoming unto holiness, and as such, historically, Holiness Pentecostals (such as the Apostolic Faith Church, Calvary Holiness Association and Free Holiness Church) traditionally adhere to the Wesleyan doctrine of outward holiness, which includes modest dress, as well as abstinence from alcohol, tobacco, and other drugs. The holiness standards vary based on the group and while many Holiness Pentecostal denominations such as the Apostolic Faith Church have specific 'holiness standards', other denominations in the present-day, such as the International Pentecostal Holiness Church, have general principles of living contained in their covenant. Conditional security is taught in Holiness Pentecostal denominations. Holiness Pentecostals observe the Lord's Day—Sunday—with morning and evening services of worship, and by refraining from servile labour and Sunday trading (cf. First-day Sabbatarianism).

Holiness Pentecostals are distinguished from the other branch of Pentecostalism, Finished Work Pentecostalism, that separated from Holiness Pentecostalism in 1910 under William Howard Durham, who did not accept the Wesleyan-Holiness doctrine of entire sanctification.

== History ==
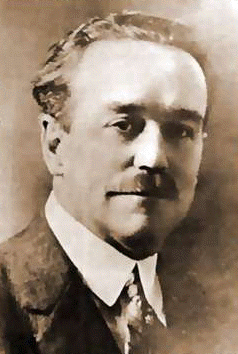
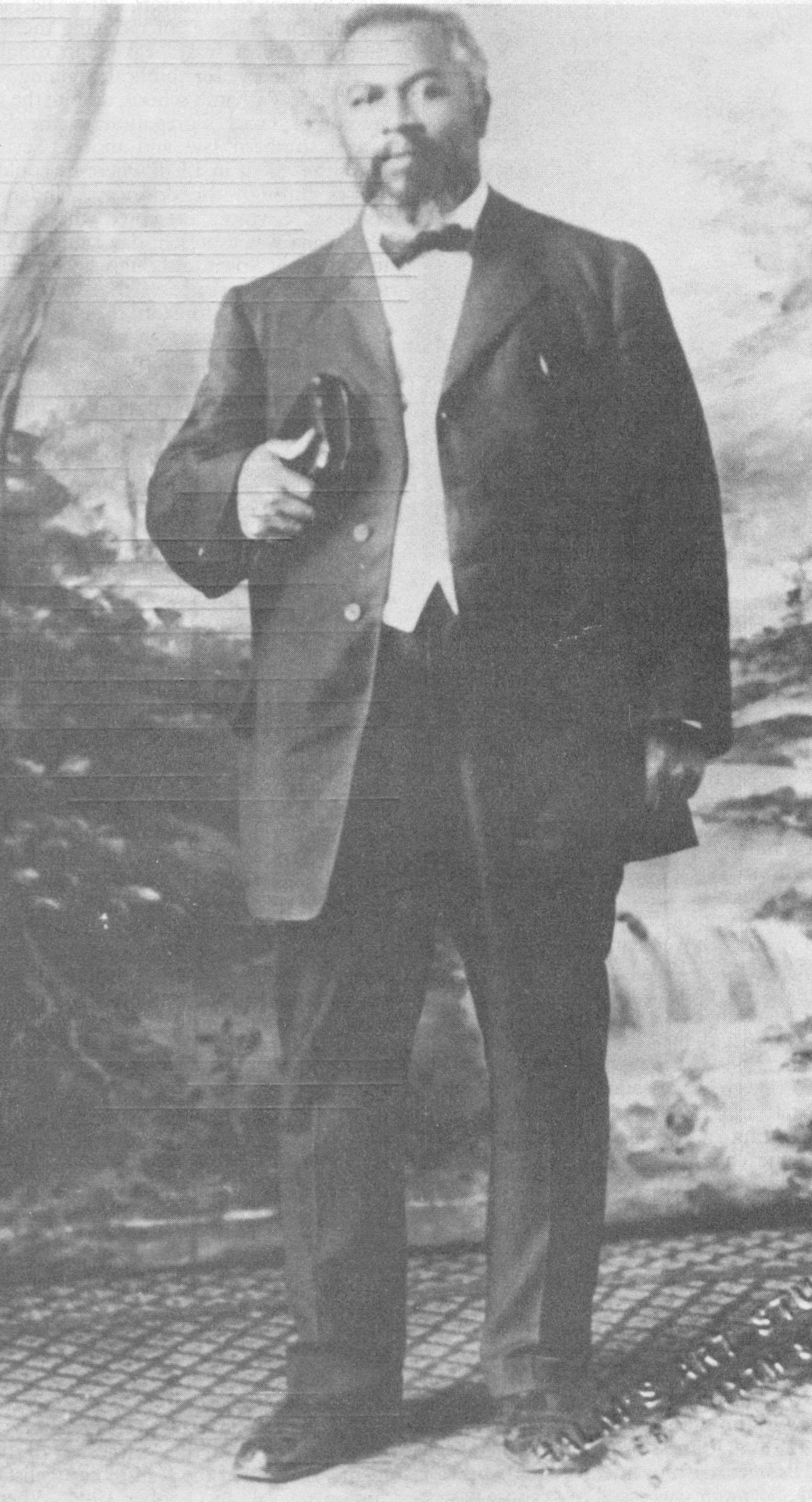
Charles Fox Parham and William Joseph Seymour, two ministers who established Pentecostal Christianity

Pentecostal Christianity was established under the work of Charles Fox Parham and William Joseph Seymour. Charles Fox Parham was originally a Wesleyan-Holiness preacher, and in 1901, under his ministry "a student had spoken in tongues (glossolalia)" and Parham thought this to be evidence of baptism in the Holy Spirit. Parham established Bethel Bible College to train students in what he called the "Apostolic Faith" (Holiness Pentecostalism). William Joseph Seymour, originally a Holiness Restorationist minister in the Church of God (Anderson, Indiana), met Charles Fox Parham in Texas through Lucy F. Farrow and there, Parham encouraged Seymour to attend his classes. Seymour did this and then accepted Parham's teaching of a third work of grace (Spirit Baptism evidenced by speaking in tongues).

At the home of Richard Asberry on Bonnie Brae Street in April 1906, Seymour and other Christians spent a month fasting and praying, after which they received the third work of grace. Word spread of this and crowds began to gather to hear Seymour's preaching. To accommodate the increasingly large number of people who wished to attend these services, William Joseph Seymour secured a deconsecrated African Methodist Episcopal church on Azusa Street, which they renamed as the Apostolic Faith Gospel Mission. There, church services lasted into the nighttime. The Apostolic Faith Gospel Mission had a lower room where people became entirely sanctified and an upper room where people prayed to receive the third work of grace. William Joseph Seymour would only let believers who had received the second work of grace (entire sanctifiation) into the upper room. At the Azusa Street Revival, the testimony of those who attended the Azusa Street Revival was "I am saved, sanctified, and filled with the Holy Ghost". The reporter Frank Bartleman wrote that "Pentecost has come to Los Angeles, the American Jerusalem."

William Joseph Seymour and Florence Crawford published a newsletter titled The Apostolic Faith to spread word of Holiness Pentecostal teaching; this was distributed at no cost to recipients. At that time, the Apostolic Faith Gospel Mission held three services a day, all days of the week, and there "thousands of seekers received the baptism of speaking in tongues." When Florence Crawford moved to Portland, she began the Apostolic Faith Church there.

Holiness Pentecostalism inherited the hymnody of the Wesleyan-Holiness movement of Methodism, though Holiness Pentecostalism "reinterpreted some of the words and phrases to accentuate the Pentecostal experience" of the third work of grace.

A preacher named William Howard Durham fractured Pentecostalism, which at that time was solely Holiness Pentecostalism. He rejected the doctrine of the second work of grace (entire sanctification) and formed Finished Work Pentecostalism. For Holiness Pentecostals, Durham was "attacking the doctrinal foundations of the [Pentecostal] movement." Holiness Pentecostal divine Charles Fox Parham saw Durham's rejection of entire sanctification as inviting "animalism" and "spiritualistic counterfeits" into the ranks of the denomination. In response to Finished Work Pentecostalism, Charles Fox Parham prophesied Durham's "destruction within six months" and said that "if this man's doctrine is true, let my life go out to prove it, but if our teaching on a definite grace of sanctification is true, let his life pay the forfeit." As Durham then "died suddenly and unexpectedly on a trip to Los Angeles on July 7, 1912, thus seemingly vindicating Parham's position", he responded, "how signally God has answered." Holiness Pentecostals saw "the belief in entire sanctification as a second work of grace" as a "test of orthodoxy" and those who professed a belief in the "Finished Work" as heretics.

== Denominations ==
- Apostolic Faith Church
- Apostolic Faith Church of God
- Calvary Holiness Association
- Church of God (Cleveland)
- Church of God (Huntsville, Alabama)
- Church of God, House of Prayer
- Church of God in Christ
- Church of God Mountain Assembly
- Church of God of the Original Mountain Assembly
- Church of God of the Union Assembly
- Church of God of Prophecy
- Congregational Holiness Church
- Fire Baptized Holiness Church of God of the Americas
- Free Holiness Church (Arkansas)
- The Indian Pentecostal Church of God
- International Pentecostal Church of Christ
- International Pentecostal Holiness Church
- Mount Sinai Holy Church of America
- Pentecostal Free Will Baptist Church
- Redeemed Christian Church of God
- The Church of God (Charleston, Tennessee)
- The (Original) Church of God
- The Church of God, Alexander Jackson Sr. General Overseer
- Triumph the Church and Kingdom of God in Christ
- United Holy Church of America
- United Pentecostal Council of the Assemblies of God

== Bible colleges ==
- Advantage College (San Jose, CA)
- Emmanuel University (Franklin Springs, GA)
- Heritage Bible College (Dunn, NC)
- Holmes Bible College (Greenville, SC)
- Lee University (Cleveland, TN)
- Southwestern Christian University (Bethany, OK)

== Camp meetings ==
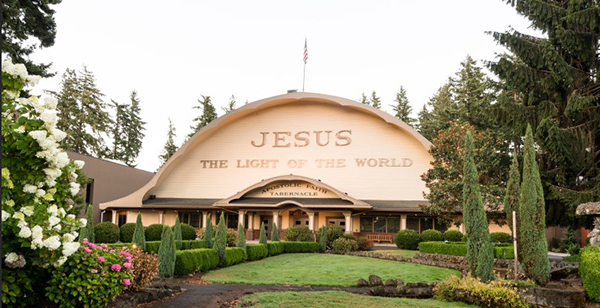
The tabernacle of the Apostolic Faith Church, a Holiness Pentecostal denomination that emerged from the Azusa Street Revival

- Portland AFC Camp Meeting (Portland, Oregon)
- Winthrop Camp Meeting (Winthrop, Arkansas)
- Blanchard Holiness Camp Meeting (Blanchard, Oklahoma)
- Dripping Springs Holiness Camp Meeting (Glenwood, Arkansas)
- Muldrow Holiness Camp Meeting (Muldrow, Oklahoma)
- Fairland Holiness Camp Meeting (Fouke, Arkansas)

== See also ==
- Temperance movement
- Wesleyan Holiness Connection
