= Third work of grace =

Doctrine in Holiness Pentecostalism

The third work of grace, also called the third blessing, is a doctrine, chiefly associated with Holiness Pentecostalism, that refers to baptism with the Holy Spirit with speaking in tongues as evidence for the same. The baptism of the Holy Ghost is taught by Holiness Pentecostals to empower the Christian believer for service to God.

== History ==
Methodism, in accordance with the teachings of John Wesley, teaches two works of grace, the New Birth (first work of grace) and entire sanctification (second work of grace). The systematic theologian of Methodism, John William Fletcher, termed the reception of entire sanctification as Baptism with the Holy Spirit, which is reflected in the doctrine of various Methodist denominations, including those of the holiness movement. (Note: In the Methodist tradition, baptism with the Holy Spirit refers to the second work of grace subsequent to the New Birth and is called entire sanctification. In Methodist theology, entire sanctification, which may be received instantaneously or approached by slow and gradual steps, makes the believer perfect in love, "cleanses the heart of the recipient from all sin (I John 1:7, 9; Acts 15:8, 9), sets him apart and endows him with power for the accomplishment of all to which he is called (Luke 24:49; Acts 1:8)." After the advent of Holiness Pentecostalism and its doctrine of a third blessing, a number of Methodists aligned themselves with the nascent charismatic movement in the 20th century and embraced belief in a third work of grace accompanied by the manifestation of spiritual gifts (which certain Charismatic Methodists call "fullness of the Holy Spirit" in order to avoid confusing this experience with the Methodist baptism of the Holy Spirit, i.e. entire sanctification), while many Methodists strongly rejected the belief in any third work of grace.)

The fathers of Holiness Pentecostalism, Charles Parham (who established Bethel Bible College) and William Seymour (who organized the Azusa Street Revival) taught that in addition to the first work of the New Birth and the second work of entire sanctification, there was a third work of grace evidenced by speaking in tongues. With this, "Parham regarded justification as removing committed sins, sanctification as dealing with the inbred propensity to commit sin, while the baptism of the Holy Ghost was empowerment." Parham taught that Methodism had erred in "erred in regarding sanctification as synonymous with the baptism of the Holy Ghost." In the Parhamian-Seymourian view, it was not the second work of grace of entire sanctification, but a third work of grace that "empowered the Christian for service." When "speaking in other tongues was manifested in the lives of believers", the believer could testify that he/she had received the third work of grace and had been "endowed with heavenly power".

The testimony of those who attended the Azusa Street Revival was "I am saved, sanctified, and filled with the Holy Ghost" in reference to the three works of grace taught by Holiness Pentecostals, the oldest branch of Pentecostalism. These three works of grace are explained by Holiness Pentecostals with the teaching that the "Holy Spirit cannot fill an unclean vessel", so the cleansing of the heart that takes place in entire sanctification is necessary before a person can be filled or baptized with the Holy Spirit.

Prior to the advent of Holiness Pentecostalism and the Parhamian-Seymourian definition of the third work of grace, the Fire-Baptized Holiness Church (a holiness denomination of Methodist patrimony) under the leadership of Benjamin Hardin Irwin (starting in 1895) was unique in that it taught three definite works of grace, with the first two works of grace being identical in doctrine to those held by Methodism—the first work of grace being the New Birth and the second work of grace being entire sanctification (baptism with the Holy Spirit); the third work of grace was taught to be baptism with fire. It was necessary for the born-again Christian to be entirely sanctified with the baptism of the Holy Spirit before one could receive the baptism of fire. However, after the advent of Holiness Pentecostalism, the majority of the Fire-Baptized Holiness Church embraced the Holiness Pentecostal position of the third work of grace being baptism of the Holy Ghost evidenced by speaking in tongues, while another part of the Fire-Baptized Holiness Church (now called the Bible Holiness Church) returned to the Methodist position of two works of grace: (1) New Birth and (2) entire sanctification (baptism with the Holy Spirit).

== Doctrinal formulation ==
The Apostolic Faith Church, one of the original Holiness Pentecostal denominations that traces its origins to the Azusa Street Revival, provides the following explication of the third work of grace, which is reflective of Holiness Pentecostal teaching on Baptism with the Holy Ghost:

The Baptism of the Holy Ghost is the enduement of power from on high upon the clean, sanctified life, and is evidenced by speaking in tongues as the Spirit gives utterance. (Luke 24:49; Acts 1:5-8; 2:1-4)
The baptism of the Holy Ghost is the experience of the Third Person of the Trinity, the Holy Spirit, coming into a person's life to give power for God's service. In order to be filled with the Holy Ghost, a person must first be born again through the experience of salvation. A second step, sanctification, occurs when the saved person goes deeper in consecration and God purges the heart from the inward nature of sin. Then, the heart is ready for the gift of the Holy Spirit. When one receives the gift of the Holy Ghost, He comes to live in the sanctified heart. When this infilling occurs, it is accompanied by the same sign as the disciples had on the Day of Pentecost—the speaking with "other tongues, as the Spirit gave them utterance" (Acts 2:4). The "other tongues" are a previously unlearned, recognizable language. Matthew 3:11; Mark 16:17; Luke 24:49; John 7:38-39; Acts 1:5-8; 2:4; 10:45-46; 19:6

== See also ==
- Consecration in Christianity
