= Apostolic Faith Church of God =

Holiness Pentecostal church in Baltimore, Maryland, US

- Classification: Holiness Pentecostal
- Origin: 1909

The Apostolic Faith Church of God is a Holiness Pentecostal denomination. It was founded in 1909 by Charles W. Lowe, and follows the teachings of William J. Seymour.

The new church was affiliated with Seymour's original church in Los Angeles, and was chartered in Maryland in 1938 following the dissolution of Seymour's original church.

Seven years later, in 1945, Lowe separated from the church he had founded to create the Apostolic Faith Church of God and True Holiness.
