= The (Original) Church of God =

- Type: Protestant
- Classification: Holiness Pentecostalism
- Origin: 1886

The (Original) Church of God is a Holiness Pentecostal Christian denomination located mostly in the Southeastern United States. Its origins can be traced to a small meeting of Christians at the Barney Creek Meeting House in Monroe County, Tennessee in 1886. This church is often denominated the Church of God (Chattanooga, Tennessee) to distinguish it from other related Church of God bodies, but the church's designation for itself is The (Original) Church of God, Inc. Offices and a publishing house are located in Chattanooga, Tennessee and Pulaski, Tennessee.

== History ==
The (Original) Church of God shares a common origin and history with the Church of God (Cleveland) and several other Christian bodies named Church of God. The (Original) Church of God, Inc. came into being in 1917, when the Church of God in Chattanooga, Tennessee, led by Joseph L. Scott, separated from the Cleveland-based church. This body's use of Original in parentheses reflects the belief that it is true to the original faith, purpose and practice of the Church of God movement. The church incorporated in 1922. Ridgedale Theological Seminary was founded in 1925.

== Beliefs ==
Five ordinances are recognized: baptism by immersion, biblical church government, the Lord's Supper, feet washing and tithing. Other beliefs include the need for repentance, justification & regeneration for salvation, the teaching on sanctification, divine healing, and speaking in tongues as the evidence of the baptism of the Holy Spirit.

== Structure ==
In 2014, the (Original) Church of God had a membership of over 500 in 14 congregations. The (Original) Church of God has around 40 ordained ministers. Churches are located mainly in the east and south-central United States, such as Tennessee, Alabama, Arkansas, Virginia, and West Virginia. They also have several churches and ministers located in the Philippines, Liberia and India. The (Original) Church of God owns a campground in Van Leer, Tennessee called Camp Ridgedale and publishes a bi-monthly magazine called The Messenger.

The (Original) Church of God is governed by a Board of Bishops and led by a General Overseer. The current general overseer is Bishop James (Randy) Taylor. 255 Bailey Lane, Pulaski, TN 38478. The church has been updating its bylaws and beliefs, the beliefs.

In 1993, the (Original) Church of God had a membership of over 18,000 in 70 congregations. The (Original) Church of God has around 50 ordained ministers. Churches are located mainly in the east and south-central United States, such as Tennessee, Kentucky, Alabama, Arkansas, Virginia, and West Virginia. They also have several churches and ministers located in the Philippines, Liberia, and India. The (Original) Church of God owns a campground in Van Leer, Tennessee and publishes a bi-monthly magazine called The Messenger.
