= United Pentecostal Council of the Assemblies of God, Incorporated =

United Pentecostal Council of the Assemblies of God
- Classification: Pentecostal
- Orientation: Holiness Pentecostal
- Official website: www.upcag.org

The United Pentecostal Council of the Assemblies of God (UPCAG) is a Trinitarian Holiness Pentecostal denomination, organized in Massachusetts in 1919.
