= Brotherly love =

Brotherly love may refer to:

== General ==
- Agape, a Greek word for divine love and love of the divine
- The Golden Rule, the principle of treating others as one would want to be treated by them
- The New Commandment of Jesus: "Love one another; as I have loved you"
- The second of the Great Commandments of Jesus: "Love your neighbor as yourself"
- Philia, a Greek word for love in the sense of friendship or affection

== Television ==
- Brotherly Love (1995 TV series), an American television series
- Brotherly Love (1999 TV series), a British television series
- "Brotherly Love" (The Cleveland Show), a 2010 episode
- "Brotherly Love" (Cracker), a 1995 three-episode story arc
- "Brotherly Love", episode of The Golden Girls
- "Brotherly Love", episode of In the Heat of the Night

== Music ==
- "Brotherly Love" (Moe Bandy song), first recorded by Moe Bandy and later as a duet between Keith Whitley and Earl Thomas Conley
- Brotherly Love, an album by Dean Dillon and Gary Stewart, or its title track
- Brotherly Love, an album by Toto bassist Mike Porcaro
- "Brotherly Love", a song written by John Farrar and recorded by Olivia Newton-John on her album Music Makes My Day
- "Brotherly Love", a song recorded by Billy Dean in his album Young Man
- "Brotherly Love", a song written by The Constructus Corporation.

== Films ==
- Brotherly Love (1928 film), a 1928 American film
- Brotherly Love (1936 film), a cartoon featuring Popeye the Sailor
- Country Dance (film), a 1970 British film, released as Brotherly Love in the U.S.
- Brotherly Love (1985 film), a 1985 television film starring Judd Hirsch
- Brotherly Love (2015 film), a 2015 American film with Keke Palmer and Quincy

== Other uses ==
- Philadelphia, known as the City of Brotherly Love (Philadelphia means “brotherly love” in Greek)
