= Second work of grace =

Christian belief of interaction with God

According to certain Christian traditions, the second work of grace (also known as the second blessing) is a transforming interaction with God that may occur in the life of an individual Christian. The defining characteristics of the second work of grace are that it is separate from and subsequent to the New Birth (the first work of grace), and that it makes a believer perfect in love through the eradication of original sin. In the Methodist, the Quaker and the Holiness Pentecostal traditions of Christianity, the second work of grace is traditionally taught to be Christian perfection (entire sanctification). In Methodist theology, the second work of grace—entire sanctification—is identified with baptism with the Holy Spirit.

== Methodism (inclusive of the holiness movement) ==
John Wesley, the founder of the Methodist movement, taught that there were two distinct phases in the Christian experience. In the first work of grace, the new birth, the believer received forgiveness and became a Christian. During the second work of grace, entire sanctification, the believer was purified and made holy. Wesley taught that entire sanctification was "wrought instantaneously, though it may be approached by slow and gradual steps". Entire sanctification eradicates original sin (the carnal nature of the human); the free will to backslide into sin and commit apostasy, however, exists (cf. conditional preservation of the saints), and on sin after entire sanctification, Churches upholding Methodist theology teach:

After we have received the Holy Ghost, any careless attitude toward the covenant we entered into when we were sanctified shall cause us to depart from grace given, and to fall into sin. Only through deep repentance, which God may permit, shall we then turn to God and receive forgiveness of our sins. ―Principles of Faith, Emmanuel Association of Churches

The systematic theologian of Methodism, John William Fletcher, termed the reception of entire sanctification as Baptism with the Holy Spirit. A Holiness text from 1897 explicates this:

Our own hearts as well as the Scriptures, teach us that even in the hearts of those who are justified and regenerated there remains something that "is not subject to the law of God, neither indeed can be." That something is variously termed in Scripture the "carnal mind," "our old man," "the sin which doth so easily beset us" and "the flesh that lusteth against the spirit." The Christian finding himself in this condition and desiring to escape the corruption of the "old man" consecrates himself definitely and wholly to God (Rom. 12:1) with all he has or ever expects to have or be; and then he is able to exercise sanctifying faith in Jesus (Acts 16:18) who baptises him (Matt. 3:11) with the Holy Ghost and fire, which baptism destroys inbred sin and bring purity—a state of perfect holiness to the heart. This is entire sanctification. This is the second work of grace. This is perfect freedom from sin—all sin—both inward and outward. There is now nothing in the heart but love and Jesus is crowned within.

Fletcher additionally emphasized that the experience of entire sanctification, through the indwelling of the Holy Spirit, empowers the believer for service to God. After Wesley's death, mainstream Methodism "emphasized sanctification or holiness as the goal of the Christian life", something that "may be received in this life both gradually and instantaneously, and should be sought earnestly by every child of God." Before a believer is entirely sanctified, he/she consecrates himself/herself to God; the theology behind consecration is summarized with the maxim "Give yourself to God in all things, if you would have God give Himself to you." The Holiness movement emerged in the 1860s with the desire to re-emphasize Wesley's doctrine of entire sanctification. Many Holiness preachers emphasized the reception of entire sanctification as an instantaneous experience. In Wesleyan-Arminian theology, the second work of grace is considered to be a cleansing from the tendency to commit sin, an experience called entire sanctification which leads to Christian perfection. The Core Values of the Bible Methodist Connection of Churches thus teaches that:

We believe that God calls every believer to holiness that rises out of His character. We understand it to begin in the new birth, include a second work of grace that empowers, purifies and fills each person with the Holy Spirit, and continue in a lifelong pursuit. ―Core Values, Bible Methodist Connection of Churches

Still, many within holiness movement (often those within the same denomination, such as the Free Methodist Church) emphasized that before a person could be entirely sanctified, they must put to death the carnal nature through a process of renunciation; this is known as the 'death route to entire sanctification' (cf. 1 Peter 4:2). (Note: Believers describe this as "dying out to self".) Though the belief in the death route to Christian perfection is held by many throughout Methodism, it is especially emphasized in the Emmanuel Association of Churches and the Immanuel Missionary Church.

John Wesley, who articulated the doctrine, taught that those who had been entirely sanctified would be perfect in love, engaging in works of piety and works of mercy—both of which are characteristic of a believer's growing in grace. This growth in grace occurs both after the New Birth (first work of grace) and entire sanctification (second work of grace). Having Christian perfection is to be distinguished from absolute perfection, which only God possesses; additionally, having infirmities (such as "immaturity, ignorance, physical handicaps, forgetfulness, lack of discernment, and poor communication skills") are not inconsistent with a person who has been entirely sanctified.

== Quakerism (inclusive of the holiness movement) ==
George Fox, the founder of Quakerism (Religious Society of Friends), taught perfection, in which the Christian believer could be made free from sin. In his Some Principles of the Elect People of God Who in Scorn are called Quakers, for all the People throughout all Christendome to Read over, and thereby their own States to Consider, he writes in section "XVI. Concerning Perfection":

HE that hath brought Man into Imperfection is the Devil, and his work who led from God; for Man was Perfect before he fell, for all God's Works are Perfect; So Christ that destroyes the Devil and his works, makes man Perfect again, destroying him that made him Imperfect, which the Law could not do; so by his Blood doth he cleanse from all Sin; And by one offering, hath he Perfected for ever them that are Sanctified; And they that do not Believe in the Light which comes from Christ, by which they might see the Offering, and receive the Blood, are in the unbelief concerning this. And the Apostles that were in the Light, Christ Jesus, (which destroyes the Devil and his works) spoke Wisdom among them that were Perfect, though they could not among those that were Carnal; And their Work was for the perfecting of the Saints, for that cause had they their Ministry given to them until they all came to the Knowledge of the Son of God, which doth destroy the Devil and his works, And which ends the Prophets, first Covenant, Types, Figures, Shadowes; And until they all came to the Unity of the Faith which purified their hearts, which gave them Victory over that which separated [sic] from God, In which they had access to God, by which Faith they pleased him, by which they were Justified; And so until they came unto a Perfect Man, unto the Measure of the Stature of the fulness of Christ; and so the Apostle said, Christ in you we Preach the hope of Glory, warning every man, that we might present every Man Perfect in Christ Jesus.

The early Quakers, following Fox, taught that subsequent to the New Birth, through the power of the Holy Spirit, man could be free from actual sinning if he continued to rely on the inward light and "focus on the cross of Christ as the center of faith". George Fox emphasized "personal responsibility for faith and emancipation from sin" in his teaching on Christian perfection. For the Christian, "perfectionism and freedom from sin were possible in this world".

This traditional Quaker teaching continues to be emphasized by Conservative Friends, such as the Ohio Yearly Meeting of the Religious Society of Friends and Holiness Friends, such as the Central Yearly Meeting of Friends.

== Keswickian theology ==
Keswickian theology teaches a second work of grace that occurs through "surrender and faith", in which God keeps an individual from sin. Keswickian denominations, such as the Christian and Missionary Alliance, differ from the Wesleyan-Holiness movement in that the Christian and Missionary Alliance does not see entire sanctification as cleansing one from original sin, whereas holiness denominations espousing the Wesleyan-Arminian theology affirm this belief.

== Holiness Pentecostalism ==
Holiness Pentecostalism (the original branch of Pentecostalism) was born out of a Wesleyan-Arminian theological background. William J. Seymour and Charles Fox Parham, the architects of Holiness Pentecostalism, taught three definite works of grace that were accomplished instantaneously: (1) the New Birth, (2) entire sanctification, and (3) speaking in tongues. In early Pentecostal thought (known as Holiness Pentecostalism), speaking in tongues was considered the third work of grace that followed the new birth (first work of grace) and entire sanctification (second work of grace). Holiness Pentecostal denominations, such as the Apostolic Faith Church, continue to teach this.

Finished Work Pentecostals (a branch of Pentecostalism that emerged in 1910) reject the second work of grace to mean entire sanctification.

== See also ==
- First work of grace (in Methodism, Quakerism, and other branches of evangelical Christianity)
- Third work of grace (in Holiness Pentecostalism)
