= Apostolic Faith Church =

Pentecostal Christian denomination

- Classification: Protestant
- Orientation: Pentecostal
- Theology: Holiness Pentecostal
- Superintendent General: Olusola Adesope
- Region: 37 countries
- Headquarters: Portland, Oregon, U.S.
- Founder: Florence L. Crawford
- Origin: 1907; Portland, Oregon
- Branched from: Azusa Street Revival
- Separations: Apostolic Church (1916)
- Congregations: 715+
- Members: 5,000+
- Official website: apostolicfaith.org

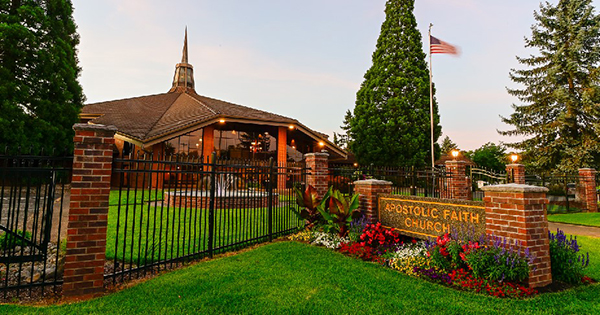

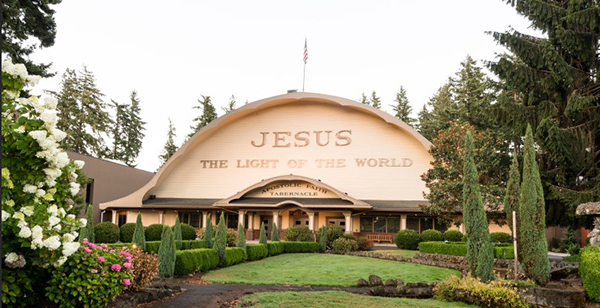
The Apostolic Faith Church World Headquarters in Portland, Oregon

The Apostolic Faith Church of Portland, Oregon (AFC), also known as the Apostolic Faith Mission of Portland, Oregon, is an international Holiness Pentecostal denomination of Christianity, with nationwide reach and headquartered in Portland, Oregon, United States. It was founded in 1907 by Florence L. Crawford, who was affiliated with William J. Seymour and the Azusa Street Revival of Los Angeles, California. By 1908 Crawford had independently founded what would become the Apostolic Faith Church. The Superintendent General of the Apostolic Faith Church is Olusola Adesope.

The Apostolic Faith Church has a presence in the United States, Canada and across Africa, Asia, Europe, Central and South America, and Australia. In 2023, the AFC had 2,396 churches served by 3,551 clergy across the globe. There are thirteen churches in Canada, fifty-nine in the United States, over one thousand in Africa, thirty throughout the Philippines, Korea, and Japan, fifty-four across Europe, and over one hundred in the Caribbean. Church-affiliated groups also regularly assemble in other parts of the world and recently include India. In some locations, member churches carry the name Trinity Apostolic Faith Church in order to differentiate themselves from non-affiliated churches in the same area.

== History ==
The founder of the Apostolic Faith Church was Florence L. Crawford. Crawford was a participant in the Azusa Street Revival. This revival began in 1906 at the Apostolic Faith Mission in Los Angeles. The Azusa Street Mission, as it was called, quickly became the center of the Holiness Pentecostal movement mainly through the publication of The Apostolic Faith newspaper. Seymour appointed Crawford as the state director of the Pacific Coast Apostolic Faith movement where she would help other missions and churches join the movement. Crawford's break with Seymour was complete by 1911. She began an independent work in Portland, Oregon, with the same name as Seymour's mission and most of the churches under her supervision followed her.

This considerably weakened Seymour's undisputed leadership of the burgeoning Pentecostal movement as most of the churches which had fed the movement chose alignment with Crawford. According to Crawford, the separation was necessitated by rumors that Seymour had abandoned the Wesleyan position that entire sanctification was a second work of grace after conversion. Crawford's mission gained further influence when Clara Lum, editor of The Apostolic Faith, transferred the paper, under controversial circumstances, to the Portland mission in mid-1908. The Apostolic Faith title changed to the Light of Hope and then The Higher Way before reverting back to The Apostolic Faith in 2017, and it is still published today.

As part of the COVID-19 pandemic, the company received between $150,000 and $350,000 in federally backed small business loans from Columbia State Bank as part of the Paycheck Protection Program. The company stated it would allow them to retain an unstated number of jobs.

== Doctrine ==
Through the years, the Apostolic Faith Church's leaders have maintained the doctrines outlined in Seymour's editions of the Apostolic Faith papers printed in 1906 through 1908. As a Trinitarian and fundamental church, their doctrinal position centers on a born-again experience, supports the Wesleyan teaching of holiness (Christian perfection), and stresses the need of sanctified believers to receive the Pentecostal experience of the baptism of the Holy Spirit; the Apostolic Faith Church teaches conditional security with respect to salvation. The Apostolic Faith Church affirms the doctrine of outward holiness, in which modesty in speech and dress is emphasized (including the non-use of jewelry), along with abstinence from alcohol and tobacco. Their teachings are in direct conflict with Calvinistic beliefs regarding sin, predestination, and eternal security.

The doctrinal statement of the Apostolic Faith Church can be found on the headquarters' website. The text of the page is reprinted below:

- The Divine Trinity consists of three Persons: God the Father, Jesus Christ the Son, and the Holy Ghost, perfectly united as one. Matthew 3:16-17; 1 John 5:7.
- Repentance is a godly sorrow for sin with a renunciation of sin. Isaiah 55:7; Matthew 4:17.
- Salvation is the act of God's grace whereby we receive forgiveness for sins and stand before God as though we had never sinned. Romans 5:1; 2 Corinthians 5:17.
- Entire Sanctification or Holiness, the act of God's grace whereby we are made holy, is the second definite work and is subsequent to justification. John 17:15-21; Hebrews 13:12.
- The Baptism of the Holy Ghost is the enduement of power from on high upon the clean, sanctified life, and is evidenced by speaking in tongues as the Spirit gives utterance. Luke 24:49; Acts 1:5-8; 2:1-4.
- Divine Healing of sickness is provided through the atonement. James 5:14-16; 1 Peter 2:24.
- The Second Coming of Jesus will be just as literal and visible as His going away. Acts 1:9-11. There will be two appearances under one coming: First, to catch away His waiting Bride. Matthew 24:40-44; 1 Thessalonians 4:15-17; second, to execute judgment upon the ungodly. 2 Thessalonians 1:7-10; Jude 14-15.
- The Great Tribulation will occur between Christ's coming for His Bride and His return in judgment. Isaiah 26:20-21; Revelation 9 and 16.
- Christ's Millennial Reign is the literal 1000 years of peaceful reign by Jesus on earth. Isaiah 11 and 35.
- The Great White Throne Judgment is the final judgment when all the wicked dead will stand before God. Revelation 20:11-15.
- The New Heaven and The New Earth will replace the present heaven and earth, which will be destroyed after the Great White Throne Judgment. 2 Peter 3:12-13; Revelation 21:1-3.
- Eternal Heaven and Eternal Hell are literal places of final destiny, each as eternal as the other. Matthew 25:41-46; Luke 16:22-28.
- Marriage is for Life, a holy institution that is binding before God, giving neither partner liberty to marry again as long as the first companion lives. Mark 10:6-12; Romans 7:1-3.
- Restitution is subsequent to salvation, wherein wrongs against our fellowmen are made right in order to have a clear conscience before God and man. Ezekiel 33:15; Matthew 5:23-24.
- Water Baptism is by one immersion "in the name of the Father, and of the Son, and of the Holy Ghost," as Jesus commanded. Matthew 3:16; 28:19.
- The Lord's Supper is an institution ordained by Jesus so that we might remember His death until He returns. Matthew 26:26-29; 1 Corinthians 11:23,26.
- Washing the Disciples' Feet is practiced according to the example and commandment Jesus gave. John 13:14-15.

The denomination teaches that speaking in tongues is only acceptable in a human language, but one which the person speaking has never learned. They do not take a collection during services but have containers where donations can be deposited. Membership is not by formally joining the church but when one is "saved" one is considered a member. They are one of the early groups that had bus ministries, ministries to ships, nursing homes, street meetings, and jail meetings.

Literature is printed in many languages and is free. All literature is prayed over for the recipients to receive healing and answers to prayers from God. Services include instrumental and vocal music, congregational singing of hymns, a time for individuals to share personal testimonies, Scripture reading, and an inspired message based on the Bible. Many of the churches have a choir and orchestra. A prayer meeting is held before every service, and all meetings end with an altar call, with the altar being benches at the front of the sanctuary where everyone is invited to come pray together. Ministers are not formally trained but are chosen by elders who laid hands on the person after it was believed they were called.
