= Third Great Awakening =

Period of religious activism in American history in the 19th and early 20th centuries

The Third Great Awakening refers to a historical period proposed by William G. McLoughlin that was marked by religious activism in American history and spans the late 1850s to the early 20th century. It influenced pietistic Protestant denominations and had a strong element of social activism. It gathered strength from the postmillennial belief that the Second Coming of Christ would occur after mankind had reformed the entire Earth. It was affiliated with the Social Gospel movement, which applied Christianity to social issues and gained its force from the awakening, as did the worldwide missionary movement. New groupings emerged, such as the Holiness movement and Nazarene and Pentecostal movements, and also Jehovah's Witnesses, Spiritualism, Theosophy, Thelema, and Christian Science. The era saw the adoption of a number of moral causes, such as the abolition of slavery and prohibition.

== Overview ==
This article focuses on the awakening that took place during the 19th century in America and Korea. A similar awakening took place in Britain, identified by J. Edwin Orr as starting in 1859 with its influence continuing through to the end of the 19th century, impacting church growth, overseas mission, and social action. Significant names include Dwight L. Moody, Ira D. Sankey, William Booth and Catherine Booth (founders of The Salvation Army), Charles Spurgeon and James Caughey. Hudson Taylor began the China Inland Mission, and Thomas John Barnardo founded his famous orphanages.

The American Protestant mainline churches were growing rapidly in numbers, wealth and educational levels, throwing off their frontier beginnings and becoming centered in towns and cities. Intellectuals and writers such as Josiah Strong advocated a muscular Christianity with systematic outreach to the unchurched in America and around the globe. Others built colleges and universities to train the next generation. Each denomination supported active missionary societies and made the role of missionary one of high prestige.

The great majority of pietistic mainline Protestants (in the North) supported the Republican Party and urged it to endorse prohibition and social reforms. The awakening in numerous cities in 1858 was interrupted by the American Civil War. In the South, on the other hand, the Civil War stimulated revivals, especially the Confederate States Army revival in General Robert E. Lee's army. After the war, Moody made revivalism the centerpiece of his activities in Chicago and founded the Moody Bible Institute. The hymns of Ira Sankey were especially influential.

Across the nation, drys crusaded in the name of religion for the prohibition of alcohol. The Woman's Christian Temperance Union mobilized Protestant women for social crusades against liquor, pornography and prostitution, and sparked the demand for women's suffrage. The Gilded Age plutocracy came under sharp attack from Social Gospel preachers and reformers in the Progressive Era. The historian Robert Fogel identifies numerous reforms, especially the battles involving child labor, compulsory elementary education, and the protection of women from exploitation in factories. With Jane Addams's Hull House in Chicago as its center, the settlement house movement and the vocation of social work were deeply influenced by the Social Gospel.

In 1880, the Salvation Army denomination arrived in America. Although its theology was based on ideals expressed during the Second Great Awakening, its focus on poverty was of the Third. All the major denominations sponsored growing missionary activities, both inside the United States and around the world. Colleges associated with churches rapidly expanded in number, size and quality of curriculum. The promotion of "muscular Christianity" became popular among young men on campus and in urban YMCAs, as well as in such denominational youth groups such as the Epworth League for Methodists and the Walther League for Lutherans. Professional baseball player Billy Sunday converted as a young man in the 1880s, became an evangelist, and is widely considered America's most influential evangelist of the first two decades in the 20th century. In 1891, basketball was invented at the International Young Men's Christian Association (YMCA) Training School in Springfield, Massachusetts.

== New religions ==
In 1879 Mary Baker Eddy founded the Church of Christ, Scientist, which gained a national following. The Society for Ethical Culture was established in New York in 1876 by Felix Adler and attracted a Reform Jewish clientele. Charles Taze Russell founded the Bible Student movement. In July 1879, Russell began publishing a monthly religious journal, Zion's Watch Tower and Herald of Christ's Presence. He and his group of fellow students first identified themselves as The People's Pulpit Association, then in 1910 as The International Bible Students Association. In 1931, after schisms within the Bible Students and gaining control of the legal entity Watchtower Bible and Tract Society, Joseph Franklin Rutherford along with former members of the Bible Student movement would go on to adopt the name Jehovah's Witnesses. The New Thought movement, which began in the 1830s, expanded as Unity and Church of Divine Science were founded.

== Holiness and Pentecostal movements ==
The goal of the Holiness movement in the Methodist church was to move beyond the one-time conversion experience that the revivals produced and reach entire sanctification. The Pentecostals went one step further, seeking what they called a "baptism in the spirit" or "baptism of the Holy Ghost" that enabled those with this special gift to heal the sick, perform miracles, prophesy, and speak in tongues.

The re-discovered Pentecostal movement can be traced to the Ocoee mountains of East Tennessee in the upper Tennessee River valley, when a group led by Methodist minister Richard Spurling met in 1886-1896 and called for holy living. At that time they experienced what is known as the baptism of the Holy Spirit, empowering Christians to live in holiness. Little is known of this movement because it happened in the mountains, compared to the Azusa Street Revival which happened in Los Angeles, California. However, the organization born from that group led by Spurling has grown to an international presence in over 200 countries around the world with a church membership of over 7 million Christians; it is known as the Church of God, with headquarters in Cleveland, Tennessee. The organization owns Lee University and Pentecostal Theological Seminary.

Charles Parham in Topeka, Kansas, who was a Methodist minister, resigned his ordination as a minister and began preaching about the baptism of the Holy Spirit. During a service on December 31, 1899, Parham laid hands on a woman named Agnes Ozman; she is supposed to have received the baptism of the Holy Spirit and to have begun speaking in tongues and prophesying. This is the root of the better known "Azusa Street Revival" in Los Angeles, California (1906) led by William J. Seymour, an African American student of Parham's.

== Impact on Korea ==
Chun Beh Im compared the evangelistic method and results of the Third Great Awakening in America with the Korean revivals of 1884–1910. Many techniques of the Second and Third Great Awakenings were transposed from America to Korea, including the circuit-riding system of the Methodists, the Baptist farmer preachers, the campus revivals of the eastern seaboard, the camp meetings in the West, the new measures of Charles G. Finney, the Layman's Prayer Revival, urban mass revivalism of Moody, and the Student Volunteer Movement. Im discovered four areas of influence from a comparison and analysis of the two countries' revivals: the establishment of tradition, the adoption of similar emphases, the incorporation of evangelistic methodologies, and the observation of the results of the revivals. The American revivals had a major influence on the Korean revivals, and the American revival tradition and enthusiasm toward missions helped Korean Christians develop their own religious experience and tradition. This tradition has influenced Korean churches even into the 21st century.

== See also ==
- Christianity in the 19th century
- Ethnocultural politics in the United States
- Temperance movement
