= Color line (racism) =

Term for racial segregation in the US

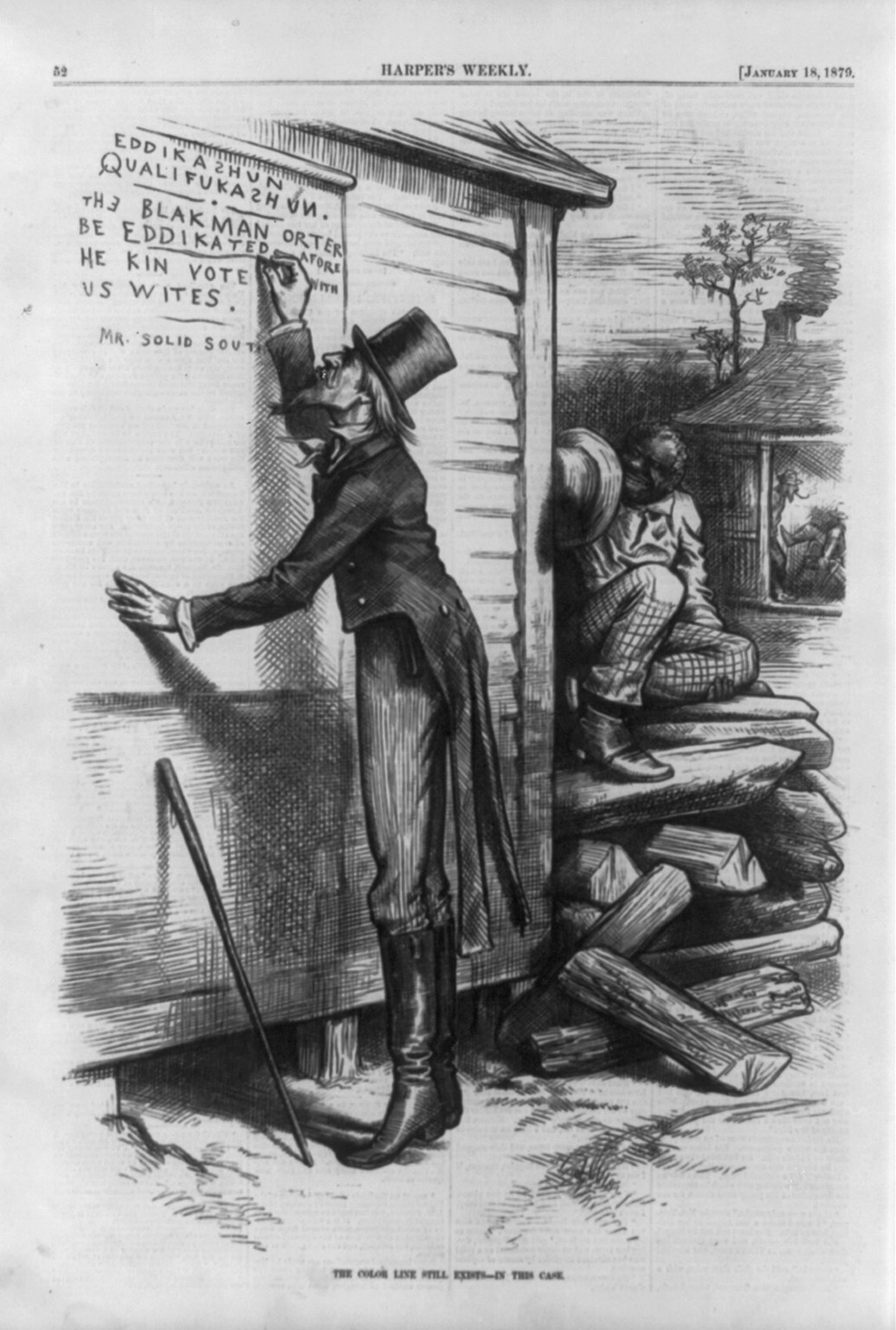

The term color line was originally used as a reference to the racial segregation that existed in the United States after the abolition of slavery. An article by Frederick Douglass that was titled "The Color Line" was published in the North American Review in 1881. The phrase gained fame after W. E. B. Du Bois' repeated use of it in his 1903 book The Souls of Black Folk.

The phrase sees current usage as a reference to modern racial discrimination in the United States and legalized segregation after the abolition of slavery and the civil rights movement.

== History ==
=== Origins ===
It is difficult to find an exact origin of the phrase "the color line." However, the phrase appeared frequently in newspapers during the Reconstruction era with specific reference to divisions between blacks and whites. For example, the July 7, 1869, issue of the Richmond Virginia Dispatch described a "color line" running between two candidates for governor. Most uses of the term in the 1870s were in newspapers from former slave states and dealt with elections.

Early usage includes an 1871 address as part of an anniversary celebration of the New England Society. At that event General Horace Porter referred to the color line as being the result of being in battle alongside black troops in Virginia which his audience found humorous. The term occurs several times in testimony during a United States Senate inquiry into the Mississippi election of 1875. J.W. Lee, previously Mayor of Aberdeen, Mississippi and Sheriff of Monroe County in the same state identified the policy of the Democrats as "the color line policy." In 1881 Frederick Douglass published an article with that title in the North American Review. He likened the color line to a disease of morality and gives seven propositions against it. At the First Pan-African Conference in London in July 1900, the delegates adopted an "Address to the Nations of the World", drafted by Du Bois and to which he was a signatory, that contained the sentence: "The problem of the Twentieth Century is the problem of the colour-line". In Du Bois's Exhibit of American Negroes at the 1900 Paris Exposition, the title page of his "The Georgia Negro: A Social Study" collection of charts and maps also includes this quote.

=== Use by Du Bois ===
Du Bois introduces the concept of the color line in his 1899 work The Philadelphia Negro when discussing social interactions between the black and white inhabitants of Philadelphia. 'In all walks of life the Negro is liable to meet some objection to his presence or some discourteous treatment; and the ties of friendship or memory seldom are strong enough to hold across the color line.' Du Bois goes on to illustrate this by discussing various social contexts in which the black American is faced with social dilemmas as to whether or not to enter white-dominated spaces: to not enter is to be "blamed for indifference", but to do so means "he is liable to have his feelings hurt and get into unpleasant altercation".

In his 1903 book The Souls of Black Folk, Du Bois used the phrase in his introduction, titled "The Forethought", writing: "This meaning is not without interest to you, Gentle Reader; for the problem of the Twentieth Century is the problem of color line". The phrase occurs again in the book's second essay, "Of the Dawn of Freedom", at both its beginning and its end. At the outset of the essay, Du Bois writes: "The problem of the twentieth century is the problem of the color-line—the relation of the darker to the lighter races of men in Asia and Africa, in America and the islands of the sea". At the end of the essay, Du Bois truncates his statement to: "The problem of the twentieth century is the problem of the color-line", the more frequently quoted version of the sentiment.

Ample nuance exists among the three versions of Du Bois’ prediction in The Souls of Black Folk, as within a very short amount of text Du Bois provides the reader with three incarnations of the thought. Some of the difference may be the result of the original serialization of the work, as parts of this book were originally serialized, many in The Atlantic Monthly. The first reference draws the reader in with a direct reference, while the second goes so far as to identify all of the areas in the world where Du Bois believed the color-line was "the problem of the twentieth century". All imply, whether directly or passively, that the color-line extends outside the bounds of the United States.

==== Du Bois’ changing attitude toward the phrase ====
Many decades later, in 1952, nine years before he moved to Ghana, Du Bois wrote an essay for Jewish Life magazine about his experiences during a trip to Poland and his changing attitude toward his phrase "the color-line". In the short essay, entitled "The Negro and the Warsaw Ghetto", Du Bois wrote about his three trips to Poland, particularly his third in 1949, during which he viewed the remains of the Warsaw Ghetto. Du Bois wrote:

The result of these three visits, and particularly of my view of the Warsaw ghetto, was not so much clearer understanding of the Jewish problem in the world as it was a real and complete understanding of the Negro problem. In the first place, the problem of slavery, emancipation and caste in the United States was no longer in my mind a separate and unique thing as I had so long conceived it. It was not even solely a matter of color and physical and racial characteristics, which was particularly a hard thing for me to learn, since for a lifetime the color line had been a real and efficient cause of misery.

He goes on to write: "No, the race problem in which I was interested cut across lines of color and physique and belief and status and was a matter of cultural patterns, perverted teaching and human hate and prejudice, which reached all sorts of people and caused endless evil to all men." These quotations are of note because they reflect an expansion of Du Bois’ original definition of the color-line to include discrimination beyond that of color discrimination, Du Bois also pared down his definition to acknowledge that the "problem of the color-line" as he initially imagined it existed in the United States and did not manifest itself identically across the world. Though discrimination existed everywhere, Du Bois expanded his mindset to include discrimination beyond that of simply black versus white.

=== Use in 20th-century literature and literary theory ===
Both the quote and the phrase can be found in numerous texts of the 20th century, both academic and non-academic alike. Langston Hughes uses the phrase in his autobiography, writing: "In Cleveland, a liberal city, the color-line began to be drawn tighter and tighter. Theaters and restaurants in the downtown area began to refuse to accommodate colored people. Landlords doubled and tripled their rent at the approach of a dark tenant." Closer to the end of the twentieth century, Karla F.C. Holloway, a professor of English at Duke University, centered her keynote address to the National Conference of Researchers of English on this sentence, saying: "Perhaps while sitting in his den or maybe in the midst of academic clutter at his university office, Du Bois penned the epic words that will center my reflections in this essay – 'The problem of the twentieth century is the problem of the color line.'"

Much of the general usage of the quote, the "problem of the color-line" is implied as only a problem in the United States. However, in Du Bois’ initial writing, he extended the problem across much of the world to "Asia", "Africa", and "the islands of the sea". Du Bois’ thought in "Of the Dawn of Freedom" implied a universal exclusivity, of "color" as the greatest problem of the 20th century. The general use of the term the "color-line" however, is usually in reference to the United States, a possibility Du Bois did not acknowledge in his initial essays.

== Current usage ==
The phrase circulates in modern vernacular as well as literary theory. For example, Newsweek published a piece by Anna Quindlen entitled "The Problem of the Color Line," about the continuing plague of racial discrimination in the United States. The phrase does not only find use in the print world, either. PBS created a series entitled America Beyond the Color Line with Henry Louis Gates Jr., a documentary series that looked at communities of African Americans in four areas of the United States. The phrase's current use in modern journalism reflects a continued use of the phrase even through the legalized segregation that continued after the abolition of slavery. It reflects a dual meaning of the phrase; one aspect of which reflects a color line created by the law, and the other of which reflects the de facto disparity between life for African Americans in the United States and life for other citizens. The term was also popularized during the emergence of Pentecostalism as it grew in North America. During a religious meeting – the Azusa Street Revival – held in Los Angeles from 1906 to 1909, the journalist, observer, and early adherent Frank Bartleman famously said, "It seemed that everyone had to go to “Azusa.” ... There were far more white people than colored coming. The “color line” was washed away in the blood."
