= Bartleman =

Bartleman is a surname. Notable people with the surname include:

- Frank Bartleman (1871–1936), American Pentecostal writer, evangelist, and missionary
- James Bartleman (singer) (1769–1821), English bass singer
- James Bartleman (born 1939), Canadian former diplomat and author
- Robin Bartleman (born 1972), American politician and educator
