= F. F. Bosworth =

American pastor

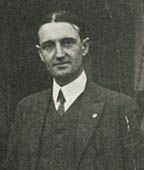
- Born: January 17, 1877; Utica, Nebraska, United States
- Died: January 23, 1958 (aged 81)
- Occupations: Pastor, evangelist, author
- Writing career
- Subject: faith healing

Fred Francis Bosworth (January 17, 1877 – January 23, 1958) was an American evangelist, an early religious broadcaster, and a 1920s and Depression-era Pentecostal faith healer who was later a bridge to the mid-20th century healing revival. He was born on a farm near Utica, Nebraska and was raised in a Methodist home. His Methodist experiences also included salvation at the age of 16 or 17, and a spontaneous healing from major lung problems a couple of years later. Bosworth's life after that was one that followed Christian principles, though his church affiliation changed several times over the years. Several years after his healing he attended Alexander Dowie's church in Zion City, Illinois, then joined the Pentecostal movement and attended Pentecostal services. Most of his later ministry was associated with the Christian and Missionary Alliance church. He could also play the trumpet.

When Bosworth came into a Pentecostal experience in 1906, he had an intense desire to preach the gospel, leaving his business pursuits and stepping out in faith for his subsistence. Approximately 1909 he moved to Texas, and in 1910 he started a church in Dallas which was loosely affiliated with the Alliance church. He was one of the founders of the Assemblies of God in 1914 and was with them until 1918 when he had a disagreement on the initial evidence of the baptism with the Holy Spirit and withdrew. He then started another church in Dallas, affiliating with the Alliance church again, and his revival meetings in the 1920s were sponsored by the Christian and Missionary Alliance church. During the 1920s he was known for his "big tent revival" and large auditorium meetings and his advocacy of faith healing, with people from all denominations attending. He was with the Alliance church until around 1934, then affiliated with them again in 1944. Starting around 1930 he began one of the early successful gospel radio ministries. Today he is best known for his book Christ the Healer which went through seven editions in his lifetime and now has over 500,000 copies in print.

== Early years ==
=== Nebraska ===
F. F. Bosworth was one of five children who grew up living on prairies in Nebraska in a devout Methodist home. His father was a Civil War veteran (part of an Illinois company), who moved to Utica, Nebraska after the Civil War was over, but before F. F. Bosworth was born. When F. F. Bosworth was about 8 or 9 years old, he accompanied his father to a soldier's reunion, where he first saw a cornet being played. After Bosworth was given a baby pig by his uncle, he raised it, traded a couple of animals, and was eventually able to trade for a cornet. He became a self-taught musician. He began playing in a juvenile village band; then he played in the senior village band. When Bosworth was around 10 or 11 years old, his parents moved from Utica to University Place, Nebraska (a places noted for higher education among Methodists in the region). He became a member of the local band and then played a leading part in the Nebraska state band and local literary societies. In 1893, at age 16, he left home.

In late 1893 or early 1894, while at a visit in Omaha, he attended a revival meeting with female friend; she convinced him to become born again. He later described the experience as joyful. and the book "Fred Francis Bosworth - His Life Story"

=== Health and healing ===
Bosworth initially developed lung problems when he was 10 or 11 years old, shortly after his parents moved to University Place, Nebraska. This occurred when he got overheated in a hot room helping with a friend's operation, then went to the cold outside and got a chill. The lung problems continued for the next eight years, getting significantly worse when he was a young man (age 18 or 19), when the doctors diagnosed tuberculosis and said that he would soon die. Bosworth then went from Nebraska to his parents' new home in Fitzgerald Georgia for a last visit and arrived in a near-death state. While there he attended a religious meeting and was approached by an older Methodist "Bible woman" who "used to walk the hills of Georgia and the Carolinas selling Bibles and preaching the gospel." The account written by Bosworth's son in a later printing of "Christ the Healer" says: "She prayed for him, he got up, and he was instantly healed." Another account, published many years earlier, adds further details to this healing. It says "Miss Perry told him how lovingly ready God was to make him well ... and laying her hands on him she prayed that he might be healed. From that self-same hour Fred began to mend, until, ere many days, his lung trouble was already a thing of the past."

=== Fitzgerald, Georgia ===
Around 1895, after Bosworth had left home, his parents moved from Nebraska to Fitzgerald, Georgia, where a Union Soldiers colony had been started. In late 1895 or early 1896 Bosworth's health was rapidly growing worse and the lung problems, which began shortly after his family moved to University place (eight years before), were getting worse. Doctors said he did not have long to live, so he took what he thought would be his final trip to see his parents. His mother nurtured his health back to a point where he could get around, and he claimed to have been miraculously healed at a religious meeting in Fitzgerald. According to Joybringer Bosworth, after his healing Bosworth became an active member of the community in Fitzgerald, buying then operating a barber shop for some time, working assistant postmaster for over a year (less than two years), then he was elected as City Clerk (a position he held for two years). In Fitzgerald he married at the age of 23 (his wife was the daughter of another Civil War veteran), and right after he was married he ran afoul of local politics by supporting someone else who was running on a prohibition platform, resulting in his not being re-elected as City Clerk at an election held shortly after his marriage. After this he became a bookkeeper, then a teller, at the new bank in the city, then worked for a mercantile company owned by the bank. In Fitzgerald, Bosworth had begun and directed a band, and had gained the respect of the band members to the extent that they tried to apply Bosworth's values to their lives.

=== Zion, Illinois ===
A year or so after they were married, after seeing copies of Dowie's newsletter, Bosworth and his wife moved to Zion, Illinois (then called Zion City), a theocratic, utopian town where modern medicine was banned and only faith healing was allowed. When he went to Zion City, he began to play his cornet again, this time in John Alexander Dowie's church, where he was soon made the band director. It appears that he first met John G. Lake at Zion City, and they would be close friends for several years. During 1905-6 Dowie's empire collapsed as millions of dollars went missing and it ended up in bankruptcy under the control of the courts. With many of Dowie's frauds emerging in the face of lengthy court proceedings, Bosworth gave up hope in Dowie.

In September 1906, though, Bosworth and his friend John G Lake were attracted to the Pentecostal message of Charles Parham, who set up a large tent in Zion and tried to attract disaffected Dowieites. Bosworth was one of half a dozen people whose homes became meeting places for the early Pentecostal believers. Before long a number of the new "Parhamites" were speaking in tongues, and the group grew to several hundred strong. The group was led by an Azusa Street Revival transplant Tom Hezmalhalch and Lake. Despite being persecuted by Dowie's successor, W.G. Voliva, the Perhamites remained intact for about a year.

In the late 1900s, Parham was hampered by controversial allegations of Sodomy, said to have been stirred by his Zion city opponent W.G. Voliva. The case was later dismissed as lacking evidence. According to Kenyon's daughter, Rose, Bosworth and Dowie met Kenyon during a trip to Chicago. Bosworth and Lake became acquaintances with Hezmalhalch when Lake was seeking baptism of the Holy Spirit. Thereafter, Lake and Hezmalhalch became ministry partners and embarked on a few years of successful ministry together. Before he went to Indiana, Lake had been led by the spirit of God to dispose his considerable estate to charitable trusts and to trust God for finances.

== Ministry ==
=== The start ===
In 1906, while still in Zion, Bosworth embraced Pentecostalism in meetings with Pentecostal pioneer, Charles Parham. The Pentecostal message met resistance from the administration in Zion City, making it so community facilities were not available for holding meetings. As a result, for weeks they met nightly in the living room of Bosworth's home, as well as in several other homes, with Parham going between the homes, prior to a large tent being erected for services.

From the time Bosworth received his Pentecostal experience, Bosworth felt driven to share the new life he experienced. One early account says he immediately took a job selling pens so he could have an opportunity to testify to others. A group including Bosworth and Lake began preaching on streets of nearby towns such as Waukegan in late 1906 where they introduced speaking in tongues. By April 1907 he was into the ministry full-time, joining Cyrus Fockler in the meetings he began to hold in Milwaukee. His ministry continued, and the December 1908 issue of Latter Rain Evangel records meetings he was holding with Fockler in Indiana. From there he held meetings in Fitzgerald Georgia, Conway S.C., then several cities in Texas. Dallas was the final city in his Texas tour, and the meetings there were in the later part of 1909. Following Bosworth's Dallas meetings, he started his first church in Dallas in 1910. The church began as an independent Pentecostal work which had a loose affiliation with the Christian and Missionary Alliance organization. In 1914 Bosworth was involved in the starting of the Assemblies of God, and was one of their first directors. In the process, he brought his church into the organization. In 1916 the Assemblies of God formalized their doctrine that the initial evidence of the Baptism with the Holy Ghost was speaking in tongues. Bosworth did not agree with this and tried to get them to change, presenting his arguments at one of their conventions. When it became clear in 1918 that they would not change their position, Bosworth quietly withdrew from the Assemblies of God and started a separate Christian and Missionary Alliance church in Dallas. It was around this time (1918) that Bosworth published his pamphlet "Do All Speak With Tongues".

=== Full time evangelism and healing ministry ===
Even when pastoring his church in Dallas, Bosworth would hold meetings in other areas, and his ministry always had an element of praying for the sick and divine healing. When his wife died in 1919, he arranged for someone to look after his children, then went on, starting larger scale evangelistic meetings. It appears the turning point for Bosworth's healing ministry were meetings in Lima, Ohio in August 1920. The pastor there asked Bosworth to preach on Divine healing. While Bosworth had previously believed in Divine Healing, and had prayed for the sick, he had not previously preached Divine Healing. Bosworth writes that he went to the Lord and asked "'suppose I preach on Healing and the people come and don't get healed?' The Lord said 'If people didn't get saved, you wouldn't stop preaching the gospel.'" Bosworth studied the question, prayed about it and saw that it was God's will to heal as well as save people. In the Lima meetings Bosworth stepped out on the Word, preached Divine Healing, and stated that healing of the body was as much a part of the gospel as salvation of the soul. He invited the sick to come and hear the word of healing for their bodies. The people responded, they were healed, and it led to more who came for salvation.

In 1924, Bosworth published the first edition of Christ the Healer, a book that contains many of his sermons on the topic of faith healing and his responses to his critics (this edition included 5 sermons). Prior to Bosworth's death, the 7th edition had been expanded to include 14 sermons. He was also the author of dozens of other tracts, printed sermons, and articles, some of which were later condensed and included in subsequent editions of Christ the Healer. One example is "The Christian Confession" (chapter titled "Confession"). Probably his most controversial pamphlet was "Do All Speak With Tongues? An Open Letter to Ministers and Saints of the Pentecostal Movement".

F. F. Bosworth held a number of evangelistic and healing meetings across the United States and Canada in the 1920s, with thirty-nine extended meeting locations in the six-and-a-half years mentioned in Joybringer Bosworth.

=== Contact with other ministries ===
Bosworth had contact with many of the Pentecostal and holiness ministers of his generation, and was both influenced by them and influenced them. Prior to coming to his Pentecostal experience, Bosworth spent several years under the ministry of John Alexander Dowie, where he would have heard many of Dowie's ideas on divine healing. From Zion City he knew John G. Lake, Charles Parham, and a number of other Pentecostal pioneers. In mid-1907, Bosworth, Lake, and Tom Hezmalhalch were visited by William Seymour and Glenn Cook from Los Angeles, thus leading to close contacts with the Azusa Street Revival. He was associated with many of the early Pentecostal ministers, had Maria Woodworth-Etter hold several months of services for him in 1912, and knew the early leaders of the Assemblies of God. Bosworth also knew many of the ministers associated with the Christian and Missionary Alliance church, including A.B. Simpson and both Paul and Luke Rader. While in the Chicago area, Bosworth also met E. W. Kenyon. It is unclear whether his meeting with Kenyon was before his move to Texas, since he had returned to the Chicago area by 1924. How close a relationship the two men had and the degree Kenyon may have influenced Bosworth's early thinking are unclear. Bosworth's 1930's booklet "The Christian Confession", which was later condensed into a chapter of the 1948 edition of "Christ the Healer", mentions that many of the thoughts in that booklet / chapter came from some of Kenyon's writings and were used with permission. One researcher, who looked at Bosworth's other works to determine if any were influenced by Kenyon could find no other link, and the 1924 edition of "Christ the Healer" does not contain the chapter that is in the 1948 edition.

=== Depression-era pioneer ===
When The Great Depression hit in 1929, money for large-scale meetings became scarce. According to Bosworth's magazine "Exploits of Faith", it appears he still had large campaigns away from home through 1931, but after that his campaigns were closer to home.

Bosworth was friends with Paul Rader, one of the first radio evangelists, and Paul Rader was broadcasting on Chicago radio stations prior to 1929. The first ad in Bosworth's magazine for a Bosworth radio program was in January 1930, indicating that his radio evangelism started in either late 1929 or early 1930. He began with a program called the "Sunshine Hour". Bosworth eventually established "The National Radio Revival Missionary Crusaders" as a nonprofit corporation in Illinois. By the early to mid-1930s he was broadcasting regularly over radio stations in the Chicago area, including WJJD. Bosworth's increased radio ministry in Chicago appears to coincide with Paul Rader's reduced broadcast frequency. Due to financial problems, Paul Rader's last evangelistic broadcasts in Chicago were in 1933. Bosworth continued to broadcast well into the 1940s. There is a general gap in the information available on F. F. Bosworth and his radio ministry from the early 1930s to the mid-1940s, with the one available magazine of his from 1942 indicating that he was broadcasting from several stations across the country, and a 1963 article providing a general overview of Bosworth's radio ministry.

During the 1930s and 1940s, it appears he also conducted many healing campaigns all over North America as finances permitted. F. F. Bosworth, as of 1950, commented that he had more than thirty years of great evangelistic campaigns, and fourteen years of this time conducted the National Radio Revival, and during which time received about a quarter of a million letters.

As mentioned by his son, R. V. Bosworth, in the final chapter of the 9th edition of Christ the Healer, Bosworth found it difficult to travel during World War II due to gas rationing, but also found it difficult not to preach. Shortly after WWII he thought his ministry might be over and he retired to Florida.

=== British Israelism ===
During the gap in information from 1934 to 1944, it appears Bosworth accepted at least some elements of British Israel theology and left the Alliance church, not to return until 1944, when he was welcomed back into the Alliance, was asked to preach at one of their conventions and along the way publicly apologized for having been in error. While some who follow British Israelism claim that F.F. Bosworth maintained a British Israel view of prophecy until his death, they do not offer any evidence to support this other than one radio sermon by Bosworth, which does not go to the extremes many do with that doctrine.

=== Africa and other overseas ministry ===
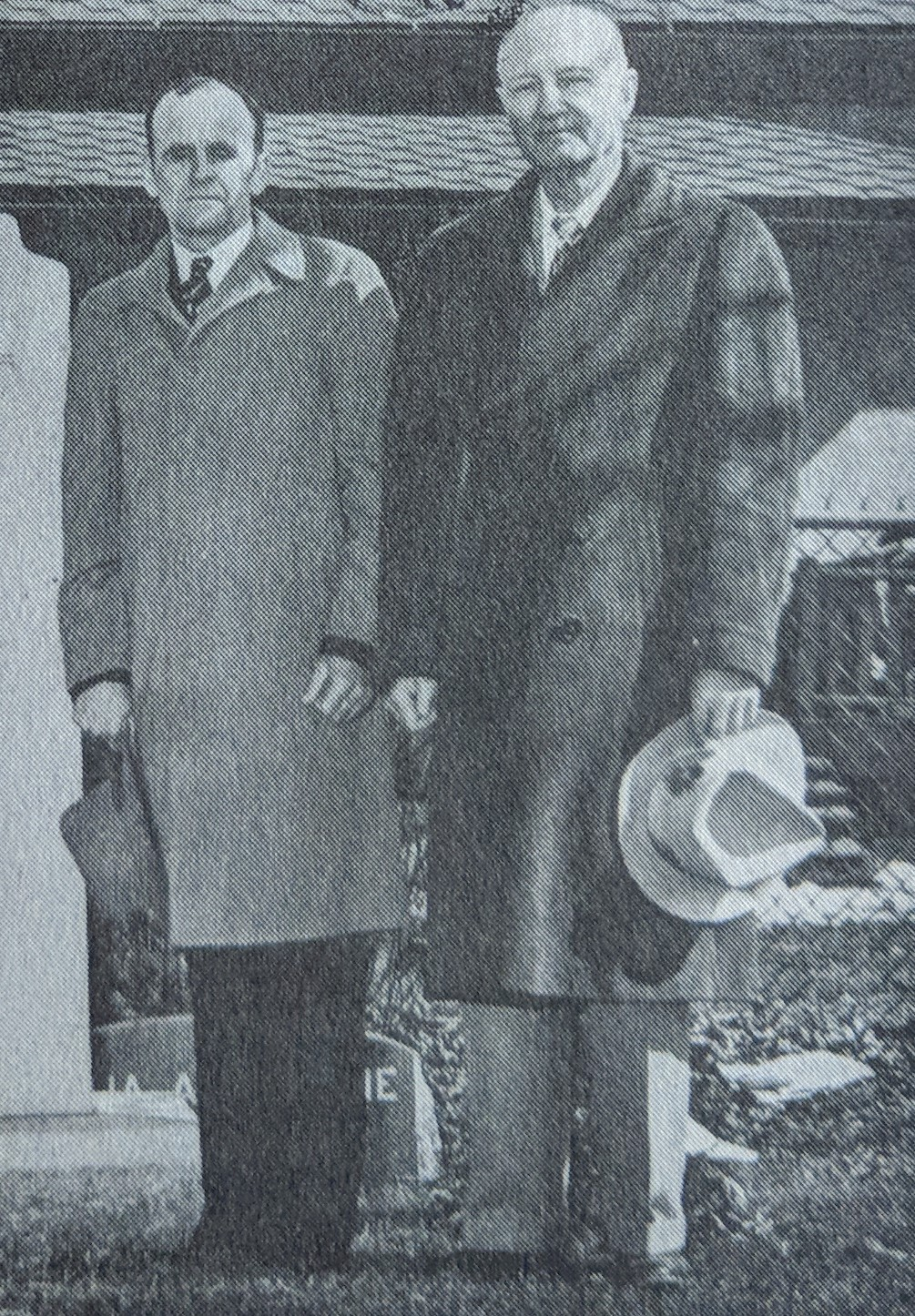
William Branham and F.F. Bosworth

Bosworth began traveling and campaigning with William Branham in 1948. In late 1951, at the age of 74, Bosworth went with William Branham to Africa to continue their work. The book, William Branham, A Prophet Visits South Africa records their time there, as does a book titled William Branham Sermons. Both of these books include a sermon of Bosworth's, and a number of William Branham's sermons refer to his time and experiences with Bosworth. After the campaign with Branham, Bosworth returned to Africa several times between 1952 and 1955, also holding campaigns in Cuba (1954) and Japan (1955 and possibly 1957), and accompanying Branham on a campaign in Switzerland and Germany in 1955. Through at least 1956, it appears that when Bosworth was not overseas, he worked with Branham on a number of campaigns.

== Death ==
In 1957, when Bosworth's family thought it was his time to go, Branham visited his bedside, prayed with him, and was greatly encouraged by his testimony. Bosworth recovered his strength, and it was not until several months later, in 1958, when he eventually died. According to his son's description in the 9th edition of "Christ the Healer", the family was gathered around Bosworth's bedside talking, laughing, and singing about three weeks after Bosworth was in bed full-time. Bosworth then looked up, never saw the family members present, and began "to greet and hug people - he was enraptured ... He did this for several hours", then with a smile on his face he lay back and went to sleep. When Bosworth died, Branham was asked by the family to come to preach his funeral but was unable to attend because he was in the middle of a campaign.

Bosworth's death certificate notes the presence of congestive heart failure and left-side paralysis due to a stroke. There was also evidence of a previous heart attack and diabetes. He also may have had lung cancer, among other ailments.

Burton "B.B." Bosworth, the younger brother of F.F., died on Feb. 17, 1958, in Ft. Lauderdale, Fla. at the age of 70. His death was caused by respiratory medullary failure, according to his death certificate. The medulla is the respiratory control center of the brain. Basically, he had a stroke to the medulla area of the brain, which controls the involuntary respiratory actions which caused respiratory failure.
