= Bethel Bible College =

Bible college in Topeka, Kansas

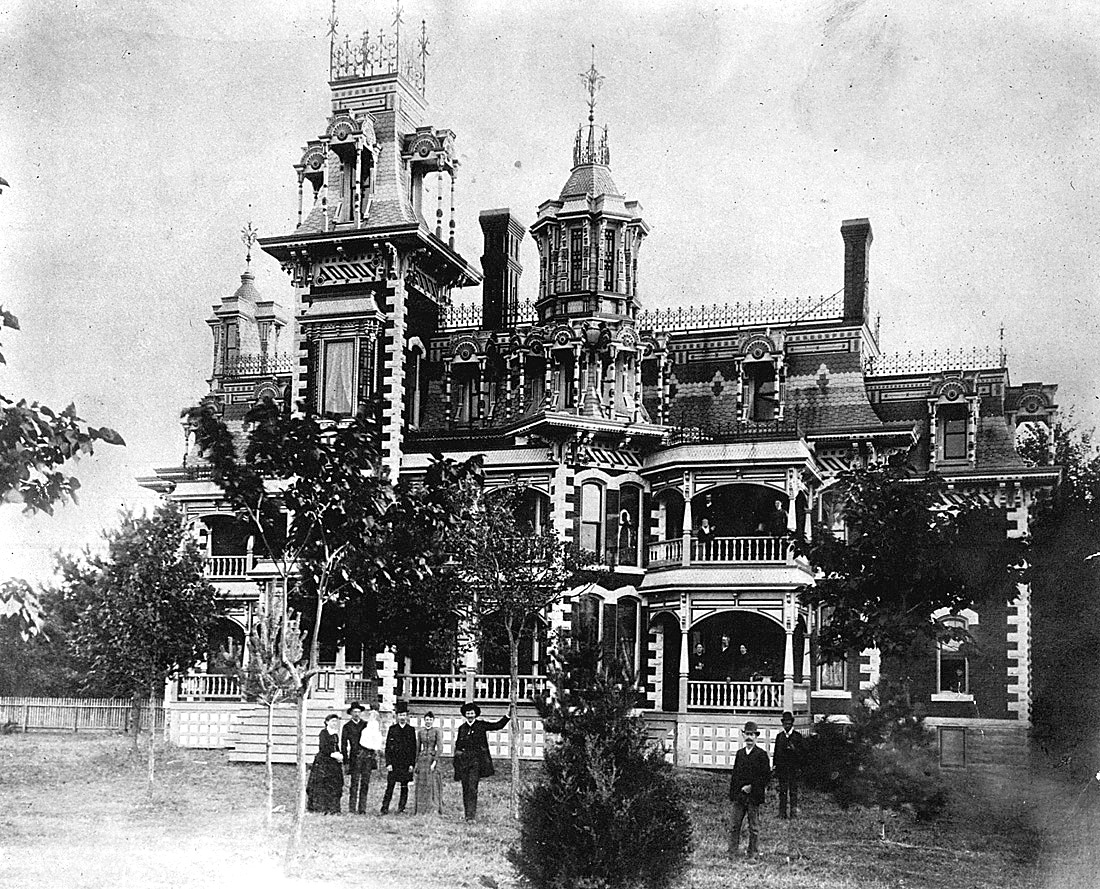
Bethel Bible College

Bethel Bible College or Bethel Gospel School was a Bible college founded in 1900 by Charles Parham in Topeka, Kansas, United States. It was located at what is now the Southeast corner of 17th and Gage Blvd. The school is credited with starting the Pentecostal movement, particularly its earliest form—Holiness Pentecostalism—due to a series of fasting days that ended in what was interpreted as speaking in tongues on January 1, 1901. Although the school would close later in 1901 due to a fire that destroyed the building, after less than two years of operation, the movement itself grew substantially to tens of millions of people around the world.

== Pentecostalism begins ==
Forty students including Agnes Ozman had gathered to learn the major tenets of the Holiness Movement from Parham. Parham wondered about the New Testament evidence for baptism in the Holy Spirit. He went on a three-day trip and asked his students to ponder this question while he was gone. They concluded that glossolalia or speaking in tongues was proof that the Holy Spirit had fallen on an individual, a view that became the doctrine of the third work of grace in Holiness Pentecostalism. Ozman was the first student to speak in tongues. Parham would take this message and hold special meetings in Joplin, MO and Houston, TX. In Houston, a black man named William Seymour heard the message and would take this teaching to Los Angeles where he would start the Azusa Street Revival. The testimony of those who attended the Azusa Street Revival was "I am saved, sanctified, and filled with the Holy Ghost" in reference to the three works of grace taught by Holiness Pentecostals: (1) the New Birth; (2) entire sanctifiation; and (3) Spirit baptism evidenced by speaking in tongues. Today many Pentecostal denominations trace their beginnings to Bethel and Azusa Street.

== See also ==
- Apostolic Faith Church
- List of defunct colleges and universities in Kansas
