= Lucy F. Farrow =

African-American pastor (1851–1911)

- Born: 1851; Norfolk, Virginia, US
- Died: 1911 (aged 59–60); Houston, Texas, US
- Occupation: Pastor

Lucy F. Farrow (1851–1911) was an African American holiness pastor who was instrumental in the early foundations of Pentecostalism. She was the first African American person to be recorded as having spoken in tongues, after attending the meetings of Charles Fox Parham, and is credited for introducing William J. Seymour to this understanding.

== Life ==
Farrow was the niece of the abolitionist Frederick Douglass and born into slavery in Norfolk, Virginia in 1851. In 1905, when she was pastoring a small Holiness church in Houston, Texas, she worked for Charles Fox Parham during his Houston crusade during that summer as a cook, then when Parham's Houston meeting closed, he invited Farrow to accompany them to Kansas as a governess for his children. During this time, she asked her friend William J. Seymour to care for her church in her absence. Through her interactions with Parham, Farrow experienced [tongues]. On her return, she encouraged Seymour to enroll in the Bible College Parham started in January 1906, where he would eventually be convinced of many of Parham's teachings.

Later in 1906, when William Seymour became the pastor of a Holiness church in Los Angeles, he sent for Farrow to join him in what would become known as the Azusa Street Revival. She would be known as the "anointed handmaiden" who laid her hands on many who received the Holy Spirit and the gift of [tongues].

Later in 1906, she would travel to Johnsonville, Liberia, and reportedly experienced the ability the gift of xenolalia and spoke the Kru language, preaching to the Kru people and spreading the Pentecostal message in Africa. After eventually returning to Los Angeles, then later to Houston, Farrow contracted tuberculosis and died in 1911. She is buried in the Olivewood cemetery in Houston, Texas.

== See also ==
- Azusa Street Revival
- Charles Fox Parham
- William J. Seymour
