= Agnes Ozman =

American Pentecostal (1870–1937)

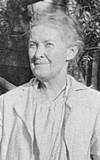
- Born: September 15, 1870; Albany, Wisconsin
- Died: November 29, 1937 (aged 67); Los Angeles, California
- Other name: Agnes Ozman LaBerge
- Occupation: Evangelist
- Known for: Pentecostalism
- Spouse: Philemon LaBerge

Agnes Ozman (1870–1937) was a student at Charles Fox Parham's Bethel Bible School in Topeka, Kansas who was known for being the first of Parham's students to speak in tongues. Although her experience came later than the Shearer Schoolhouse Revival and comparable events, it was Ozman's experience that became widely known, helping to launch the modern Pentecostal-Holiness movement in the early 20th century.

Her parents were farmers near Albany, Wisconsin, where Agnes and her six siblings attended the Methodist Episcopal Church. Ozman was 30 years old when she studied at Bethel Bible School in Topeka in 1900-1901.

Parham, Ozman's teacher at the school, was aligned with the Holiness movement and taught the concepts of faith healing and sanctification. Parham told his students to ponder over what the Bible verse "receive the gift of the Holy Spirit" (Acts 2:38) might mean and whether any evidence specifically related to this gift could be found, giving them three days, while he was absent, for this assignment. By the time he returned his students collectively agreed that if the Holy Spirit had descended upon an individual, then speaking in tongues would be present and constitute sufficient proof of that. The students pointed out that this type of event was mentioned four times in the Acts of the Apostles. Therefore, on New Year's Eve, Parham and his students planned to pray for the gift of the Holy Spirit. On January 1, 1901, Ozman asked her mentor to pray that she could be filled with the Holy Spirit through the laying on of hands, so that she might speak in tongues.

According to Stanley Frodsham's book titled With Signs Following: The Latter Day Pentecostal Revival:

On 11:00 p.m. January 1, 1901, Agnes N.O. Ozman La Berge, who began attending Bethel Bible College in Topeka, Kansas (Stone's Folly or Mansion), requested that hands, most likely those of Charles Parham, be laid upon her so that she would receive the gift of the Holy Ghost, while typically praying the benediction of Hebrews 13:20-21 "Now the God of peace, that brought again from the dead our Lord Jesus, that great shepherd of the sheep, through the blood of the everlasting covenant, Make you perfect in every good work to do his will, working in you that which is wellpleasing in his sight, through Jesus Christ; to whom be glory for ever and ever. Amen."

Frodsham's book quotes Agnes Ozman-La Berge as follows:

"It was common for me to pray the verses while praying, and it was as if hands were laid upon my head that the Holy Spirit fell upon me and I began to speak in tongues, glorifying God. I talked several languages, and it was clearly manifest when a new dialect was spoken. I had the added joy and glory my heart longed for, and a depth of the presence of the Lord within that I had never known before. It was as if rivers of living water were proceeding from my innermost being."

According to her fellow students, their prayers were heard, and her colleagues reported that a halo had surrounded both her face and head and that she started speaking Chinese. Not long after, Parham and 34 other students also began speaking in unknown languages. It is said that Ozman could not speak English for three days and was only able to write in Chinese characters. Many experienced gifts of the Holy Spirit that day, and soon the group went out from Kansas City to spread the news. These events were reported in newspapers, including the St. Louis Dispatch which included a picture of the inspired writing.

Out of this experience, Charles Parham and nine others received the experience of speaking in tongues. Parham then opened Bible colleges in Houston, Texas, which led to Lucy Farrow speaking in tongues in 1906, and an estimated 13,000 others speaking in tongues on 214-216 Bonnie Brae Street in the city of Los Angeles, California. By 1909, at the Los Angeles Azusa Street Mission under the Pastorate of William J. Seymour and with the aid of Lucy Farrow, an estimated 50,000 people received this experience of speaking in tongues.

Later in her life Agnes admitted that she had been wrong to believe that all people would speak in tongues when they were baptized with the Holy Spirit. Writing in The Latter Rain Evangel of January 1909 she wrote, "Some time ago I tried but failed to have an article printed which I wrote calling attention to what I am sure God showed me was error. The article maintained that tongues was not the only evidence of the Spirit's Baptism. When that article was refused I was much tempted by Satan, but God again graciously showed me He had revealed it to me, and satisfied my heart in praying that He might reveal this truth to others who would spread it abroad. For awhile [sic] after the baptism I got into spiritual darkness, because I did as I see so many others are doing these days, rested and reveled in tongues and other demonstrations instead of resting alone in God."

Ozman died from heart failure in 1937.
