= Charles Fox Parham =

American preacher and evangelist (1873–1929)

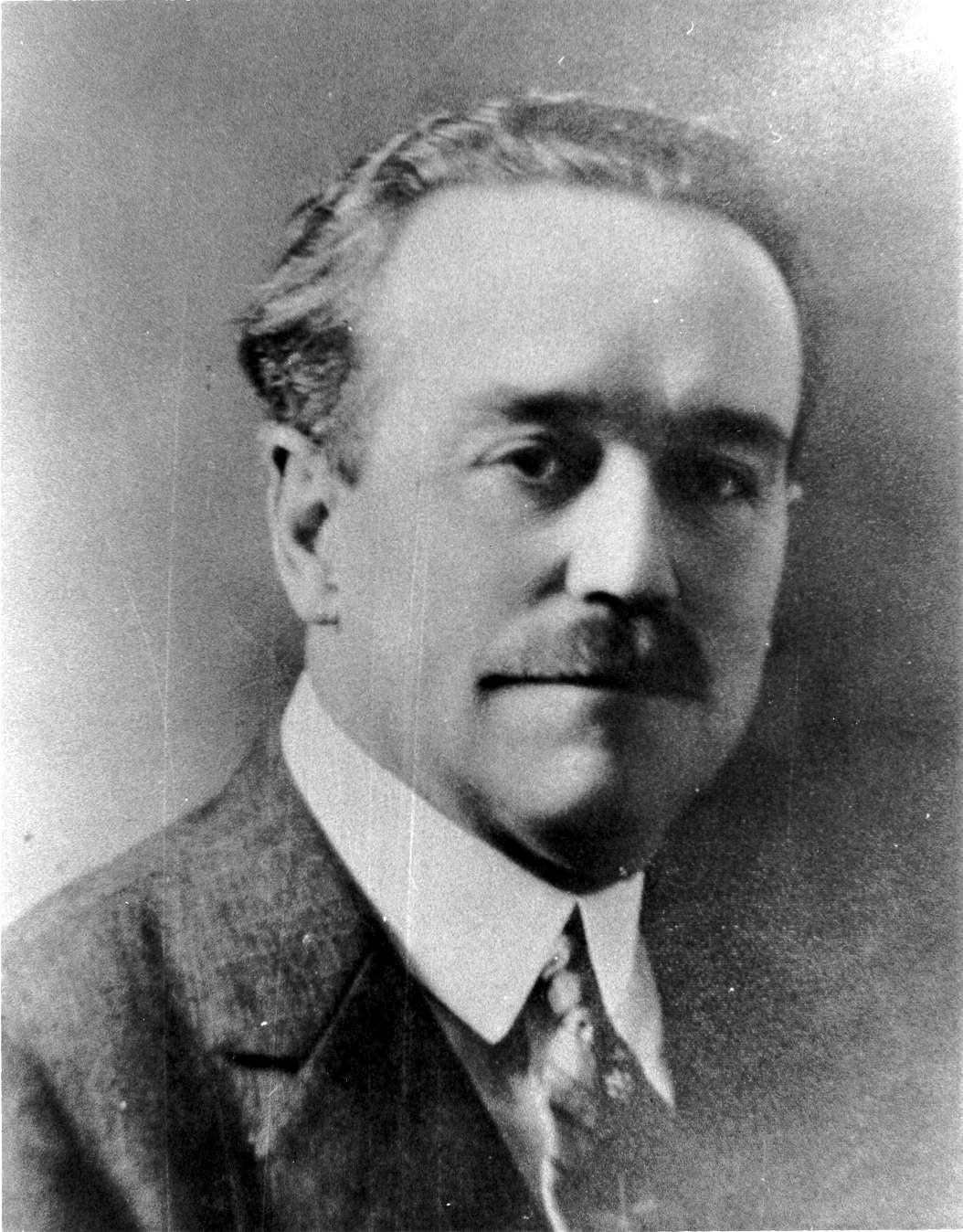
- Born: June 4, 1873; Muscatine, Iowa, U.S.
- Died: January 29, 1929 (aged 55); Baxter Springs, Kansas, U.S.
- Occupation: Evangelist
- Spouse(s): Sarah Thistlewaite, 1896–1929, (his death)

Charles Fox Parham (June 4, 1873 – January 29, 1929) was an American preacher and evangelist. Together with William J. Seymour, Parham was one of the two central figures in the development and initial spread of early Pentecostalism, known as Holiness Pentecostalism. It was Parham who associated glossolalia with the baptism in the Holy Spirit, a theological connection crucial to the emergence of Pentecostalism as a distinct movement. Parham was the first preacher to articulate Pentecostalism's distinctive doctrine of evidential tongues, and to expand the movement.

== Personal life ==
Parham, one of five sons of William and Ann Parham, was born in Muscatine, Iowa, on June 4, 1873, and moved with his family to Cheney, Kansas, by covered wagon in 1878. William Parham owned land, raised cattle, and eventually purchased a business in town. Parham's mother died in 1885. The next year his father married Harriet Miller, the daughter of a Methodist circuit rider. Harriet was a devout Christian, and the Parhams opened their home for "religious activities". Charles married Sarah Thistlewaite, the daughter of a Quaker. Their engagement was in summer of 1896, and they were married December 31, 1896, in a Friends' ceremony.

== Ministry ==
=== Early ministry ===
Parham began conducting his first religious services at the age of 15. He was a lay preacher in the Congregational Church before switching his denominational affiliation to Methodism. In 1890, he enrolled at Southwestern College in Winfield, Kansas, a Methodist affiliated school. He attended until 1893 when he came to believe education would prevent him from ministering effectively. He then worked in the Methodist Episcopal Church as a supply pastor (he was never ordained). Parham left the Methodist church in 1895 because he disagreed with its hierarchy. He complained that Methodist preachers "were not left to preach by direct inspiration". Rejecting denominations, he established his own itinerant evangelistic ministry, which preached the ideas of the Holiness movement and was well received by the people of Kansas.

=== Topeka, Kansas ===
Sometime after the birth of his son, Claude, in September 1897, both Parham and Claude fell ill. Attributing their subsequent recovery to divine intervention, Parham renounced all medical help and committed to preach divine healing and prayer for the sick. In 1898, Parham moved his headquarters to Topeka, Kansas, where he operated a mission and an office. It was also in Topeka that he established the Bethel Healing Home and published the Apostolic Faith magazine. Parham operated on a "faith" basis. He did not receive offerings during services, preferring to pray for God to provide for the ministry.

Parham, "deciding to know more fully the latest truths restored by the later day movements", took a sabbatical from his work at Topeka in 1900 and "visited various movements". While he saw and looked at other teachings and models as he visited the other works, most of his time was spent at Shiloh, the ministry of Frank Sandford in Maine, and in an Ontario religious campaign of Sandford's. From Parham's later writings, it appears he incorporated some, but not all, of the ideas he observed into his view of Bible truths (which he later taught at his Bible schools). In addition to having an impact on what he taught, it appears he picked up his Bible school model, and other approaches, from Sandford's work.

When he returned from this sabbatical, those left in charge of his healing home had taken over and, rather than fighting for control, Parham started Bethel Bible College at Topeka in October 1900. The school was modeled on Sandford's "Holy Ghost and Us Bible School", and Parham continued to operate on a faith basis, charging no tuition. He invited "all ministers and Christians who were willing to forsake all, sell what they had, give it away, and enter the school for study and prayer". About 40 people (including dependents) responded. The only text book was the Bible, and the teacher was the Holy Spirit (with Parham as mouthpiece).

Prior to starting his Bible school, Parham had heard of at least one individual in Sandford's work who spoke in tongues and had reprinted the incident in his paper. He had also come to the conclusion that there was more to a full baptism than others acknowledged at the time. By the end of 1900, Parham had led his students at Bethel Bible School through his understanding that there had to be a further experience with God, but had not specifically pointed them to speaking in tongues. While Parham's account indicates that when classes were finished at the end of December, he left his students for a few days, asking them to study the Bible to determine what evidence was present when the early church received the Holy Spirit, this is not clear from the other accounts. The students had several days of prayer and worship, and held a New Year's Eve watchnight service at Bethel (December 31, 1900). The next evening (January 1, 1901) they also held a worship service, and it was that evening that Agnes Ozman felt impressed to ask to be prayed for to receive the fullness of the Holy Spirit. Immediately after being prayed for, she began to speak in what they referred to as "in tongues", speaking in what was believed to be a known language.

=== Christian Faith Movement ===
Parham's controversial beliefs and aggressive style made finding support for his school difficult; the local press ridiculed Parham's Bible school calling it "the Tower of Babel", and many of his former students called him a fake. By April 1901, Parham's ministry had dissolved. It was not until 1903 that his fortunes improved when he preached on Christ's healing power at El Dorado Springs, Missouri, a popular health resort. Mary Arthur, wife of a prominent citizen of Galena, Kansas, claimed she had been healed under Parham's ministry. She and her husband invited Parham to preach his message in Galena, which he did through the winter of 1903–1904 in a warehouse seating hundreds. In January, the Joplin, Missouri, News Herald reported that 1,000 had been healed and 800 had claimed conversion. In the small mining towns of southwest Missouri and southeastern Kansas, Parham developed a strong following that would form the backbone of his movement for the rest of his life.

Out of the Galena meetings, Parham gathered a group of young coworkers who would travel from town to town in "bands" proclaiming the "apostolic faith". Unlike other preachers with a holiness-oriented message, Parham encouraged his followers to dress stylishly so as to show the attractiveness of the Christian life. It was at this time in 1904 that the first frame church built specifically as a Pentecostal assembly was constructed in Keelville, Kansas. Other "apostolic faith assemblies" (Parham disliked designating local Christian bodies as "churches") were begun in the Galena area. Parham's movement soon spread throughout Texas, Kansas, and Oklahoma.

During 1906 Parham began working on a number of fronts. In Houston, Parham's ministry included conducting a Bible school around 1906. Several African Americans were influenced heavily by Parham's ministry there, including William J. Seymour. Both Parham and Seymour preached to Houston's African Americans, and Parham had planned to send Seymour out to preach to the black communities throughout Texas. In September he also ventured to Zion, IL, in an effort to win over the adherents of the discredited John Alexander Dowie, although he left for good after the municipal water tower collapsed and destroyed his preaching tent. For about a year he had a following of several hundred "Parhamites", eventually led by John G Lake. In 1906, Parham sent Lucy Farrow (a black woman who was cook at his Houston school, who had received "the Spirit's Baptism" and felt "a burden for Los Angeles"), to Los Angeles, California, along with funds, and a few months later sent Seymour to join Farrow in the work in Los Angeles, California, with funds from the school. Seymour's work in Los Angeles would eventually develop into the Azusa Street Revival, which is considered by many as the birthplace of the Pentecostal movement. Seymour requested and received a license as a minister of Parham's Apostolic Faith Movement, and he initially considered his work in Los Angeles under Parham's authority. However, Seymour soon broke with Parham over his harsh criticism of the emotional worship at Azusa Street and the intermingling of whites and blacks in the services.

His commitment to racial segregation and his support of British Israelism have often led people to consider him as a racist. However, some have noted that Parham was the first to reach across racial lines to African Americans and Mexican Americans and included them in the young Pentecostal movement. He preached in black churches and invited Lucy Farrow, the black woman he sent to Los Angeles, to preach at the Houston "Apostolic Faith Movement" Camp Meeting in August 1906, at which he and W. Fay Carrothers were in charge. This incident is recounted by eyewitness Howard A. Goss in his wife's book, The Winds of God, in which he states: "Fresh from the revival in Los Angeles, Sister Lucy Farrow returned to attend this Camp Meeting. Although a Negro, she was received as a messenger from the Lord to us, even in the deep south of Texas." Nonetheless, Parham was a sympathizer for the Ku Klux Klan and even preached for them.

=== Scandal and decline of influence ===
Another blow to his influence in the young Pentecostal movement were allegations of sexual misconduct in fall 1906. This was followed by his arrest in 1907 in San Antonio, Texas on a charge of "the commission of an unnatural offense," along with a 22-year-old co-defendant, J.J. Jourdan. Parham repeatedly denied being a practicing homosexual, but coverage was picked up by the press. Finally, the District Attorney decided to drop the case. Parham and his supporters insisted that the charges had been false, and were part of an attempt by Wilbur Voliva to frame him. Parham had previously stopped preaching at Voliva's Zion City church in order to set up his Apostolic Faith Movement. However, Parham's opponents used the episode to discredit both Parham and his religious movement. Posters with a supposed confession by Parham of sodomy were distributed to towns where he was preaching, years after the case against him was dropped. Parham was never able to recover from the stigma that had attached itself to his ministry, and his influence waned.

In addition there were allegations of financial irregularity and of doctrinal aberrations. In the aftermath of these events his large support base in Zion descended into a Salem-like frenzy of insanity, eventually killing three of their members in brutal exorcisms. Members of the group, who included John G Lake and Fred Bosworth, were forced to flee from Illinois, and scattered across America. As the focus of the movement moved from Parham to Seymour, Parham became resentful. His attacks on emerging leaders coupled with the allegations alienated him from much of the movement that he began. He became "an embarrassment" to a new movement which was trying to establish its credibility.

== Death ==
As a boy, Parham had contracted a severe rheumatic fever which damaged his heart and contributed to his poor health. At one time he almost died. Parham recovered to an active preaching life, strongly believing that God was his healer. While he recovered from the rheumatic fever, it appears the disease probably weakened his heart muscles and was a contributing factor to his later heart problems and early death. By 1927 early symptoms of heart problems were beginning to appear, and by the fall and summer of 1928, after returning from a trip to British Mandate Palestine (which had been a lifetime desire), Parham's health began to further deteriorate.

In early January 1929, Parham took a long car ride with two friends to Temple, Texas, where he was to be presenting his pictures of the Holy Land. On January 5, he collapsed while showing his slides. When his wife arrived, she found out that his heart was bad, and he was unable to eat. Against his wishes (he wanted to continue his preaching tour), his family brought him home to Baxter Springs, Kansas, where he died on the afternoon of January 29, 1929. (Note: While some feel Parham's exact death date is obscure, details and timing shown in the biography "The Life of Charles F Parham", by his wife, confirmed January 29, 1929 as the date of his death. In addition to providing his exact date of death, the biography provides dates for a number of events prior to and following his death which confirms the date. The obscurity concerning the date of Parham's death may relate to the low profile of his passing away – to prevent an adverse reaction by those who were against Parham, he was buried in a simple grave, the location was not advertised, and it was not until later that a larger, more public, marker was placed over his grave.)

== Beliefs ==
Parham's beliefs developed over time. Several factors influenced his theological ideas. He preferred to work out doctrinal ideas in private meditation, he believed the Holy Spirit communicated with him directly, and he rejected established religious authority. He focused on "salvation by faith; healing by faith; laying on of hands and prayer; sanctification by faith; coming (premillennial) of Christ; the baptism of the Holy Ghost and fire, which seals the bride and bestows the gifts".

=== Initial evidence ===
His most important theological contributions were his beliefs about the baptism with the Holy Spirit. There were Christians groups speaking in tongues and teaching an experience of Spirit baptism before 1901, like for example, in 17th century, the Camisards and the Quakers.

However, Parham was the first to identify tongues as the "Bible evidence" of Spirit baptism. It is not clear when he began to preach the need for such an experience, but it is clear that he did by 1900.

Initially, he understood the experience to have eschatological significance—it "sealed the bride" for the "marriage supper of the Lamb". The bride of Christ consisted of 144,000 people taken from the church who would escape the horrors of the tribulation. It was Parham's desire for assurance that he would be included in the rapture that led him to search for uniform evidence of Spirit baptism.

Later, Parham would emphasize speaking in tongues and evangelism, defining the purpose of Spirit baptism as an "enduement with power for service". Parham believed that the tongues spoken by the baptized were actual human languages, eliminating the need for missionaries to learn foreign languages and thus aiding in the spread of the gospel. Some of Parham's followers even traveled to foreign countries in hopes of using glossolalia to communicate with the locals without learning the local languages but after consistent failed attempts at xenoglossia "many of Parham's followers became disillusioned and left the movement."

=== Other beliefs ===
Parham believed in annihilationism—that the wicked are not eternally tormented in hell but are destroyed. According to this belief, immortality is conditional, and only those who receive Christ as Lord and Savior will live eternally. He stated in 1902, "Orthodoxy would cast this entire company into an eternal burning hell; but our God is a God of love and justice, and the flames will reach those only who are utterly reprobate". He also believed in British Israelism, an ideology maintaining that the Anglo-Saxon peoples were among the Ten Lost Tribes of Israel. In addition, Parham subscribed to rather unorthodox views on creation. He believed God took two days to create humans—non-whites on the sixth day and whites on the eighth. Parham also supported Theodor Herzl and the struggle for a Jewish homeland, lecturing on the subject often.

Oneness Pentecostals would agree with Parham's belief that Spirit baptized (with the evidence of an unknown tongue) Christians would be taken in the rapture but his teachings on British Israelism and the annihilation of the wicked were vehemently rejected.

== Legacy ==
Parham originated the doctrine of initial evidence—that the baptism of the Holy Spirit is evidenced by speaking in tongues. It was this doctrine that made Pentecostalism distinct from other holiness Christian groups that spoke in tongues or believed in an experience subsequent to salvation and sanctification. In a move criticized by Parham, his Apostolic Faith Movement merged with other Pentecostal groups in 1914 to form the General Council of the Assemblies of God in the United States of America. Today, the worldwide Assemblies of God is the largest Pentecostal denomination. In 1916, the fourth general council of Assemblies of God met in St. Louis, MO to decide on the mode of baptism they would use. After a vote, out of approximately 430 ministers, 133 were asked to leave because the majority ruled they would maintain the Trinitarian formula of baptism as the official baptism of the Assemblies of God. This move formally sparked the creation of the Pentecostal Assemblies of the World, which would eventually create the United Pentecostal Church International and the Assemblies of the Lord Jesus Christ.
