= Singing in the Spirit =

Singing in the Spirit or singing in tongues, in Pentecostal and charismatic Christianity, is the act of worshiping through glossolalic song. The term is derived from the words of Paul the Apostle in 1 Corinthians 14:15, "I will pray with my spirit, but I will pray with my mind also; I will sing praise with my spirit, but I will sing with my mind also".

The purposes for glossolalic singing are the same as those of non-glossolalic singing, including praise, thanksgiving (1 Corinthians 14:15-17), and petition (Romans 8:26-27) to God. Singing in the Spirit may be done solo or together as a congregation during a worship service. Some Pentecostals and charismatics believe if it is done by an individual, as opposed to the congregation as a whole, then the song should be interpreted by one with the gift of interpretation (the interpretation also being in song form).

On congregational singing in the Spirit, Donald Hustad describes a pattern observed in Pentecostal and charismatic churches in which, during worship, someone begins to utter musical sounds, which may or may not have recognizable words. Other members of the congregation join in and, although there is no particular effort to match the pitch or the words, the overall effect is harmonious. "It is as if the strings of a huge Aeolian harp have been set in motion by the wind of the Holy Spirit. The strangely-beautiful sound rises in volume, lasts for a longer or shorter period, and then gradually dies away."
