= William J. Seymour =

American Holiness Pentecostal preacher (1870–1922)

William Joseph Seymour
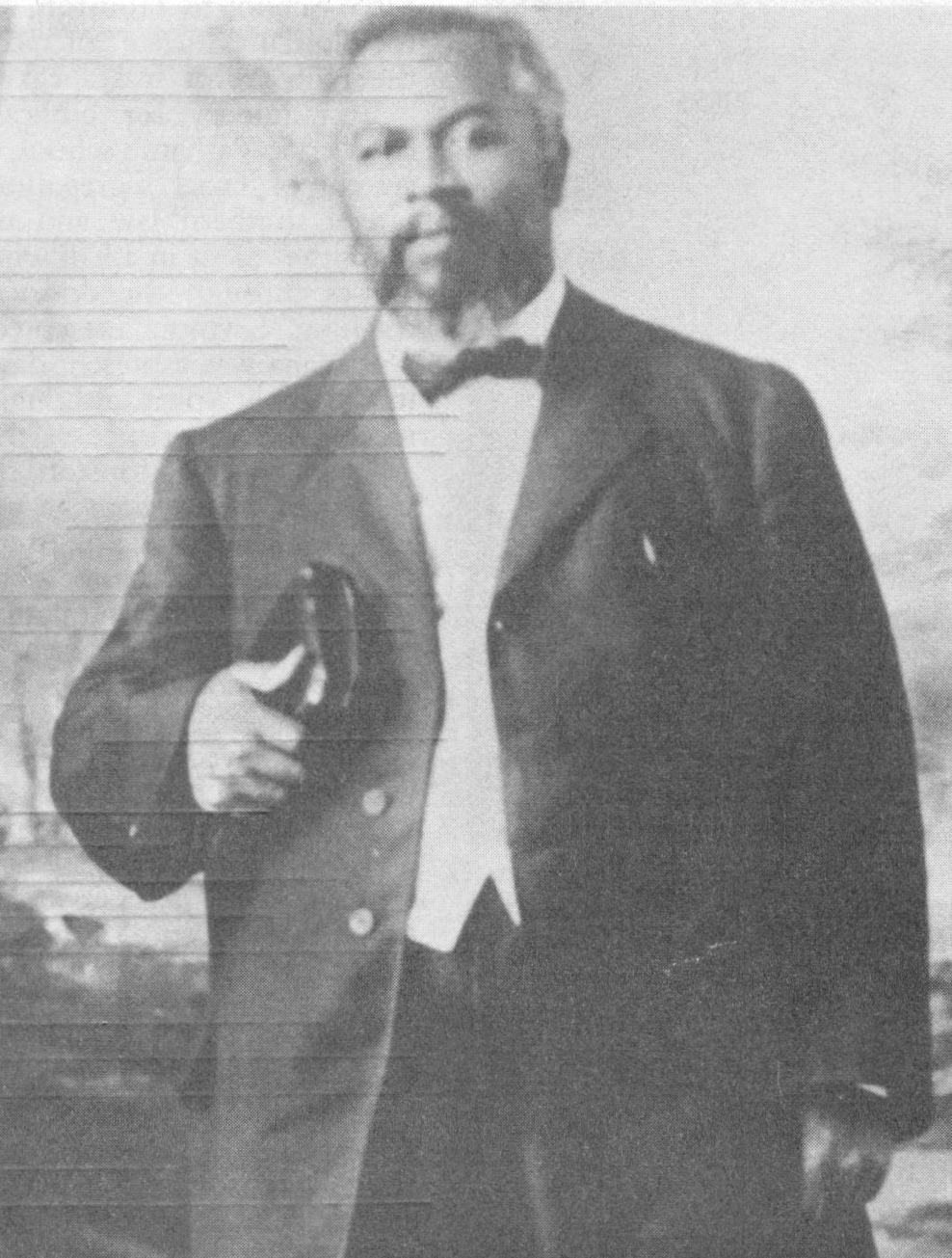
- Seymour, c. 1910s
- Born: May 2, 1870; Centerville, Louisiana, U.S.
- Died: September 28, 1922 (aged 52); Los Angeles, California, U.S.
- Occupation: Pastor
- Spouse: Jennie Evans Moore m. 1906

William Joseph Seymour (May 2, 1870 – September 28, 1922) was an American Holiness Pentecostal preacher.

Seymour was the second of eight children born in an African-American family to emancipated slaves. He was a student of the early Pentecostal minister Charles Parham, and he adopted Parham's belief that speaking in tongues was the sign of receiving the baptism in the Holy Spirit. In 1906, Seymour moved to Los Angeles, California, where he preached the Pentecostal message and sparked the Azusa Street Revival. The revival drew large crowds of believers as well as media coverage that focused on controversial religious practices as well as the racially integrated congregation, atypical in light of racial norms in the United States at the time. Seymour's writings for The Apostolic Faith newspaper launched him into prominence within the young Pentecostal movement. Seymour broke with Parham in 1906 over theological differences.

As the revival's influence extended beyond Los Angeles through evangelism and missionary work, Seymour was in the process of developing the revival into a larger organization called the Apostolic Faith Movement. This process was ultimately defeated by power struggles with other ministers, such as Florence L. Crawford and William Howard Durham, which damaged the unity of the early Pentecostal movement and led to a decrease in Seymour's influence. By 1914, the revival was past its peak, but Seymour continued to pastor the Apostolic Faith Mission until his death. The revival acted as a catalyst for the spread of Pentecostal practices throughout the world.

== Early life ==
William Joseph Seymour was the second of eight children born to emancipated slaves Simon and Phyllis Salabar Seymour in Centerville, Louisiana. He was baptized as a child at the Church of the Assumption in Franklin, a Catholic parish. In 1884, when Seymour was fourteen years old, his parents built a house about a mile and a half from his birthplace adjacent to the New Providence Baptist Church in Centerville that the family likely attended while remaining Catholics.

While serving in the Union Army during the Civil War, Seymour's father contracted an illness from which he finally died in November 1891. The twenty-one-year-old William then became the primary provider for his family, growing subsistence crops with very limited income from other sources. The family was able to keep their property but lived at the poverty level.

Seymour grew up during a period of heightened racism that likely led to his decision to move to Indianapolis in 1895, where he attended the Simpson Chapel Methodist Episcopal Church (among others) and became a born-again Christian.

== Early career ==
In Indianapolis, Seymour was introduced to the Holiness movement through Daniel S. Warner's "Evening Light Saints," a group whose distinctive beliefs included non-sectarianism, faith healing, foot washing, the imminent Second Coming of Christ, and separation from "the world" in actions, beliefs, and lifestyle, including not wearing jewelry or neckties. In the summer of 1900, Seymour returned to Louisiana and worked briefly as a farm hand.

In 1901, Seymour moved to Cincinnati, where he worked as a waiter and probably attended God's Bible School and Training Home, a school founded by holiness preacher Martin Wells Knapp. At Knapp's school, blacks and whites studied side by side. Knapp taught Premillennialism—that Jesus would return prior to a literal millennium—and also took seriously "special revelation" such as dreams and visions. While in Cincinnati, Seymour contracted smallpox and was blinded in his left eye. Seymour blamed his disability on his reluctance to answer God's call to the ministry.

Seymour moved to Houston in 1903. During the winter of 1904–1905, he was directed by a "special revelation to Jackson, Mississippi, to receive spiritual advice from a well-known colored clergyman". He probably met Charles Price Jones and Charles Harrison Mason, founders of what would become the Church of God in Christ. Between 1895 and 1905, Seymour also met other holiness leaders, including John Graham Lake and Charles Parham, who was leading a growing movement in the Midwest.

Parham's Apostolic Faith Movement emphasized speaking in tongues. Although speaking in tongues had occurred in some isolated religious circles as early as 1897, Parham began to practice it in 1900 and made the doctrine central to his theological system, believing it to be a sign that a Christian had received the baptism with the Holy Spirit. On January 1, 1901, Parham and some of his students were praying over Agnes Ozman when she began to speak in what was interpreted to be Chinese, a language Ozman never learned. Pentecostals identify Ozman as the first person in modern times to receive the gift of speaking in tongues as an answer to prayer for the baptism of the Holy Spirit. Parham also spoke in tongues and went on to open a Bible school in Houston as his base of operations in 1905.

When Houston African American holiness leader Lucy F. Farrow took a position with Charles Parham's evangelistic team as his children's nanny, Farrow asked Seymour to pastor her church. In 1906, with Farrow's encouragement, Seymour joined Parham's newly founded Bible school. Though Seymour's attendance at Parham's school violated Texas Jim Crow laws, with Parham's permission, Seymour simply took a seat just outside the classroom door. Parham and Seymour shared pulpits and street corners on several occasions during the early weeks of 1906, with Parham only permitting Seymour to preach to blacks. During this time, Seymour continued praying that he would receive the baptism with the Holy Spirit. Though unsuccessful at the time, he remained committed to Parham's beliefs about speaking in tongues, but he rejected Parham's belief in the annihilation of the wicked and in the use of tongues in evangelism. Parham understood the gift of tongues to be xenoglossy, unlearned human languages to be used for evangelistic purposes.

Within a month of studying under Parham, Seymour received an invitation to pastor a holiness mission in Los Angeles founded by Julia Hutchins, who intended to become a missionary to Liberia. Although Parham considered Seymour unqualified because he had not yet been baptized in the Holy Spirit, Seymour went to Los Angeles anyway.

== Azusa Street Revival ==
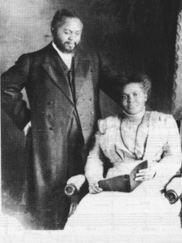
Seymour and his wife, Jennie

=== Origins of the revival ===
Seymour arrived in Los Angeles on February 22, 1906, and preached at Julia Hutchins's church two days later. Seymour argued that speaking in tongues was the evidence of having received the Holy Spirit, even though he had not experienced it himself. Hutchins and J. M. Roberts, president of the Southern California Holiness Association, rejected Seymour's position as contrary to accepted holiness views and had the church doors padlocked to keep Seymour out. Hutchins and the local holiness association called a special meeting at which they asked Seymour doctrinal questions. Among other things, the holiness leadership claimed that sanctification and the baptism of the Holy Spirit were the same thing, while Seymour remained unconvinced that the leaders themselves had been baptized in the Spirit. The association president removed Seymour from the pastorate, forbidding him to teach his doctrine of baptism in the Spirit in the holiness church. Nevertheless, he told Seymour that he was pleased Seymour was seeking baptism in the Spirit, adding, "When you receive it, please let me know because I am interested in receiving it too."

=== Speaking in tongues ===
Seymour stayed at the home of a friend, Edward Lee, and started a prayer meeting at Lee's house. When it grew too large for the house, it moved two blocks away to the home of another African American, Richard Asberry. (One attendee, Jennie Evans Moore, later married Seymour.) The prayer group accepted Seymour's teaching and prayed to receive the baptism of the Holy Ghost. To help him minister to these people as they sought the baptism of the Spirit, he contacted two friends in Houston: Lucy Farrow and Joseph Warren, who he invited to join them at the Asberry's home. The core group was made up of about 15 African Americans, including five children. Others joined them, including a former Baptist named Frank Bartleman, who would later publish a detailed account of the Azusa Street Revival. The size of the meetings at the Asberry's house continued to grow as word got out about the new teachings among the Los Angeles holiness sector.

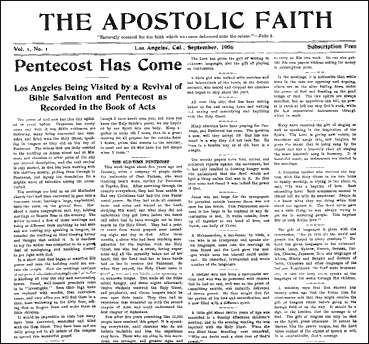
Headline of the first ever publication of the Apostolic Faith, from September 1906

On Friday, April 6, 1906, the members of the meeting decided to add fasting to their discipline of regular prayer. They planned a ten-day fast, during which they would study Acts 2:1–4 and pray each evening until they had the same experience described in that text. On April 9, Edward Lee spoke in tongues after Seymour and the newly arrived Lucy Farrow laid hands on him in Lee's home. Overjoyed, the group walked to the Asberry's house for the evening meeting. Seymour took his text, as was expected, from Acts 2:4: "And they were all filled with the Holy Ghost, and began to speak with other tongues, as the Spirit gave them utterance." He then went on to explain what had just happened to Edward Lee. No sooner had he completed the story, when someone else began to speak in tongues. Before the evening was over, several others, including Jennie Evans Moore, had spoken in tongues. Over the next three days, the Asberry home became the focus of attention among the various networks of Wesleyan holiness people. As Frank Bartleman observed, "The news spread like fire, naturally." The Azusa Street Revival had begun.

=== Move to Azusa Street and worldwide influence ===
Three days later, on April 12, after a long evening spent in prayer, Seymour himself received the baptism in the Holy Spirit and spoke in tongues. By that time, the group was far too large for the Asberry's house; at one point the weight of the overflowing attendees caused the front porch to collapse, forcing Seymour to look for a new location. The group moved to an old African Methodist Episcopal church building at 312 Azusa Street in Los Angeles, and while legally incorporated as the Apostolic Faith Mission, it also became known as the Azusa Street Mission.

The revival quickly grew. Crowds of up to 1,500 packed into the small mission for the better part of three years. During the peak of the revival, meetings ran from mid-morning to midnight, seven days a week. Well-known names in the early Pentecostal movement like Parham, Lake, F. F. Bosworth, Thomas Hezmalhalch, and many others attended the revival and then took what they had received to the mission fields.

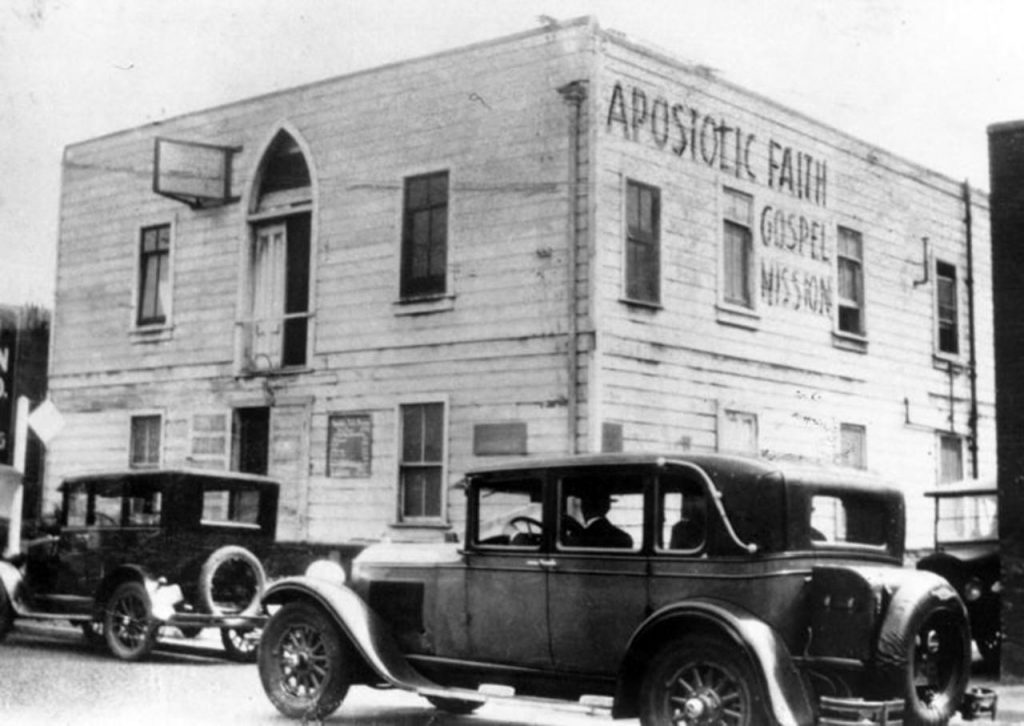
The Apostolic Faith Mission on Azusa Street

From the beginning, the movement was racially egalitarian. Blacks and whites worshiped together at the same altar, against the normal segregation of the day. Seymour claimed that the Holy Spirit was bringing people together across all social lines and boundaries to the revival. He not only rejected the existing racial barriers in favor of "unity in Christ", but he also rejected the then almost-universal barriers to women in any form of church leadership. Latinos soon began attending as well, after a Mexican-American worker received the Holy Spirit baptism on April 13, 1906.

Seymour was clearly the leader of the Azusa revival in the beginning. He delegated authority to twelve overseers, ordained ministers, and commissioned missionaries. He also began publishing a newspaper, The Apostolic Faith, in September 1906. Within one year, the circulation of Seymour's paper reached 40,000 issues. With the notable exception of Parham, who was uncomfortable with the mixing of races at Azusa, many other prominent holiness preachers, like G.B. Cashwell and C.H. Mason, made the pilgrimage to Los Angeles to preach and pray alongside Seymour.

The resulting movement became widely known as Pentecostalism, likening it to the manifestations of the Holy Spirit recorded as occurring in the first two chapters of the book of Acts, from the day of the Feast of Pentecost onwards. By the end of 1909, the movement had achieved geographical ubiquity. Every region of the United States had a Pentecostal presence, with additional missions planted in 50 nations worldwide.

== Decline of the Azusa Street Revival ==
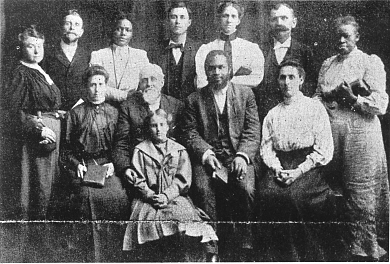
The leaders of the Apostolic Faith Mission. Seymour is front row, second from the right; Jennie is back row, third from left.

=== Opposition ===
As with most new religious movements, the Azusa Street Revival was not without controversy. Newspapers published such titles as, "Religious Fanaticism Creates Wild Scene", "Holy Kickers Carry on Mad Orgies", "All Night Meetings in Azusa Street Church, Negroes and Whites Give Themselves Over to Strange Outbursts of Zeal", "Whites And Blacks Mix in a Religious Frenzy", "Wives Say They Left Husbands to Follow Preacher", "Disgusting Scenes at Azusa Street Church", and "Crazed Girls in Arms of Black Men."

In October 1906, Parham arrived at the Azusa Street Mission. After observing some ecstatic practices and racial mixing in worship, he went to the pulpit and began to preach that God was disgusted at the state of the revival. Seymour refused to back down from his doctrines, and Parham then denounced the Azusa revival as false. Parham launched a racially tinged assault on what he deemed fanaticism and religious anarchy and demanded reforms that included the outright dismissal of many of Seymour's key aides. He claimed that Seymour had corrupted the teaching of tongue-speech; Parham believed that the spoken tongues had to be a recognizable human language (xenoglossy), while Seymour's theology allowed for a divine language that could not be understood by human ears (glossolalia). Parham denounced these views as unscriptural. Parham also preached against the racial mixing of the revival. Seymour responded by recanting an earlier acknowledgement of Parham's authority and declaring the Holy Ghost to be the mission's only leader.

Parham became the most far-reaching challenge to Seymour's leadership. Seymour dismissed Parham from the mission, but he stayed in town long enough to establish a small, competing congregation just blocks from the mission. Parham also appealed to the press to recognize him as the leader of the movement. The Seymour–Parham breakup marked the beginning of the end of Parham's prominence in the movement; however, as it turned out, Azusa's days were also numbered. The peak of the revival spanned from 1906 through 1908.

=== Apostolic Faith publication ===
The revival at Azusa continued to grow until 1908. Parham and other evangelists such as Florence Crawford (Seymour's former State Director of the Pacific Coast Apostolic Faith Movement) began discrediting the movement through doctrinal differences. After breaking her relationship with Seymour in 1907, Crawford quickly formed an independent work in Portland, Oregon, under the same name Seymour used, Apostolic Faith Movement. She then began to undermine Seymour's undisputed leadership of the movement on the Pacific Coast. Seymour's marriage to Jennie Evans Moore on May 13, 1908, did not sit well with his secretary, Clara Lum, who had already begun showing allegiance to Crawford. Lum had arguably the most powerful position outside of Seymour in the movement because of her extensive experience and abilities, particularly as editor of the newspaper. Disapproving of Seymour's action, Lum resigned her post, stole the paper's mailing list and joined Crawford in Portland, where they began publishing The Apostolic Faith newspaper without Seymour.

Without possession of the mailing list, Seymour lost control of the newspaper, and his authority over the burgeoning Pentecostal revival began to slip. Lum and Crawford refused to give control of the paper back to Seymour when he and others went to Portland, and with no recourse left to him, he returned empty-handed to Los Angeles. The loss of the newsletter was a crippling blow to the Azusa revival. Seymour remained the pastor of the Apostolic Faith Mission until his death, but his significant contributions to the larger American Pentecostal movement were largely minimized by his contemporaries.

=== Final years ===
Another blow to Seymour's authority in the later movement was the split between Seymour and William Durham. During one of Seymour's revival tours in 1911, he asked Durham if he would serve as the visiting preacher while he was gone. Durham agreed, but his views on sanctification caused a schism in the church. Seymour was asked to return to Azusa immediately, while his wife Jennie padlocked Durham out of the mission. Durham began to attack Seymour publicly, launching a rhetoric campaign claiming that Seymour was no longer following the will of God and was not fit to be a leader. This did further harm to Seymour's ministry. Even after Durham's sudden death in 1912, the Pentecostal community in Los Angeles remained split.

Although his message had spread around the world, Seymour's congregation on Azusa Street had shrunk to a small, local, Black American church by 1914. He continued as pastor for the rest of his life. On September 28, 1922, Seymour suffered two heart attacks and died in his wife's arms. He was buried in Evergreen Cemetery in East Los Angeles, near influential Pentecostal preacher Francisco Olazábal. Jennie Seymour died on July 2, 1936, and was buried next to her husband.

== Legacy and influence ==
Under Seymour's leadership, the Azusa Street Mission sent evangelists throughout the United States, spreading the Pentecostal message from Los Angeles all over the United States and resulting in many missions that modeled themselves after Azusa. By 1914, Pentecostalism had spread to almost every major U.S. city. All major American Pentecostal denominations can trace their origins to Azusa Street, including the Assemblies of God, the Church of God in Christ,the Pentecostal Assemblies of the World, the United Pentecostal Church, and the Pentecostal Holiness Church.

The mission's doctrines quickly went around the world, with many of the missionaries spreading the new message having themselves been at the Azusa Street revival. By 1907, missionaries from Azusa Street had reached Mexico, Canada, Western Europe, the Middle East, West Africa, and parts of Asia. In 2006, estimates of worldwide Pentecostal membership range from 9 million to 20 million.
