= Frank Bartleman =

American writer and missionary (1871–1936)

- Born: December 14, 1871
- Died: August 23, 1936 (aged 64)
- Occupations: Author, Evangelist, Missionary
- Website: frankbartleman.blogspot.com

Frank Bartleman (December 14, 1871 – August 23, 1936) was an American Pentecostal writer, evangelist and missionary. He converted to Pentecostalism and became a preacher. He began his writing career in 1905.

== Early life ==
Bartleman was born the third of five sons on a farm near Carversville, Pennsylvania to Frank Bartleman, a strict German and Roman Catholic immigrant and Margaret (Hellyer) Bartleman, an American-born Quaker of English and Welsh stock. Bartleman worked on his parents’ farm until he moved to Philadelphia at age 17. In Philadelphia he worked odd jobs and attended Grace Baptist Church, where he converted on October 15, 1893. The following summer he began formal preparation for full-time ministry at Temple University. He also studied briefly at the Moody Bible Institute. In the following years Bartleman ministered with the Salvation Army, the Wesleyan Methodists, Pillar of Fire, and Peniel Missions.

On May 2, 1900, Bartleman married Anna Ladd, a Bulgarian woman who had been adopted and raised by American Methodist missionaries. The Bartlemans had four children together. Their first child, Esther, died shortly after birth and Frank recommitted himself to ministry as a result.

From 1906 to 1908, Bartleman attended prayer meetings led by William J. Seymour prior to the Azusa Street Revival.

== Achievements ==
Bartleman wrote many daily articles for Pentecostal magazines and documented the events that led up to the 1906 Los Angeles revival. Through his writing he accomplished much in the area of evangelism during his lifetime. His book Azusa Street describes the events surrounding the Pentecostal revival. He authored six books, four pamphlets, over five hundred and fifty published articles, and one hundred tracts. Bartleman is best remembered for his chronicles of the 1906 Los Angeles revival. Of the revival, held in Los Angeles from 1906 to 1909, Bartleman famously wrote, "It seemed that everyone had to go to “Azusa.” ... There were far more white people than colored coming. The “color line” was washed away in the blood."

After the Los Angeles revival and his missionary work (ending with the start of World War I) he returned to evangelistic street work until his death in 1936. He is buried in Burbank, California, at Valhalla Memorial Park.

== Missionary work ==
After joining Alma White and the Pillar of Fire holiness church in Denver, Bartleman continued the work that became his lifelong mission – working with down-and-outs, alcoholics and wayward girls, mostly in inner city rescue missions. Bartleman's first mission work began while he was studying at Temple University. He set out in slums, he first set out for the Middle Alley and Trout Street areas, and evangelized. For a short time after quitting a shoe job in 1895, Bartleman made ends meet selling religious books, which he used as an opportunity to spread the Gospel. In February 1897, Bartleman entered the Salvation Army. He worked with the Salvation Army at first in Philadelphia for five months and then in Johnstown for one month, before deciding to leave because he saw no fruit in the ministry. After leaving the Salvation army, Bartleman performed mission work in Chicago with one Reverend McFadden, the pastor of a Gospel Mission. While in Chicago, he attended the Moody Bible Institute, which saw him work with various missions, such as the Pacific Garden Mission, in order to pay for room and board. During his first semester at the institute, Bartleman also took a trip on the institute's Gospel Wagon, during which he and fellow member of the institute took to the streets to preach and sell Colportage books. Bartleman drove the Gospel Wagon from Chicago to North Carolina. He remained in the American south, rather than returning to the Bible Institute. In addition to missionary work in America, Bartleman also ministered in China sometime between 1908 and 1916, joining other Azusa inspired missionaries like Alfred Goodrich Garr.

== List of works ==
Frank Bartleman authored the following works:

- Frank Bartleman, 1925. How Pentecost Came to Los Angeles. Republished as Azusa Street 1980. Logos International, Plainfield, New Jersey. ISBN 978-0-88270-439-5
- Two Years Mission Work In Europe
- My Story: The Latter Rain
- From Plow to Pulpit
- The Deity of Christ
- Dew From Heaven

Bartleman was a contributor to the following publications:

- Way of Faith (Columbia, SC)
- Word and Work (Framingham, MA)
- Confidence (Sunderland, U.K.)
