= Azusa Street Revival =

Historic Pentecostal revival meeting

The Azusa Street Revival was a historic series of revival meetings that took place in Los Angeles, California. It was led by William J. Seymour, an African-American preacher. The revival began on April 9, 1906, and continued until roughly 1915.

Seymour was invited to Los Angeles for a one-month engagement at a local church, but found himself barred because of his controversial views on baptism with the Holy Ghost after his first Sunday. He continued his ministry in the homes of sympathetic parishioners, and on the night of April 9, 1906, first one, then six others in his meeting began to speak in tongues and shout out loud praising God, so loudly that the neighborhood was alerted. The news quickly spread; the city was stirred; crowds gathered; services were moved outside to accommodate the crowds who came from all around; people fell down as they approached, and attributed it to God; people believed that they were baptized in the Holy Spirit and that the sick had been healed.

The testimony of those who attended the Azusa Street Revival was "I am saved, sanctified, and filled with the Holy Ghost" in reference to the three works of grace of Holiness Pentecostals, the original branch of Pentecostalism. To further accommodate the crowds, an old dilapidated, two-story frame building at 312 Azusa Street in the industrial section of the city was secured. This building, originally built for an African Methodist Episcopal (AME) church, had more recently been used as a livery stable, storage building and tenement house. In this humble Azusa Street mission, a continuous three-year revival occurred and became known around the world. Stanley H. Frodsham, in his book, With Signs Following, quotes an eye-witness description of the scene: The revival was characterized by spiritual experiences accompanied with testimonies of physical healing miracles, worship services, and speaking in tongues. The participants were criticized by some secular media and Christian theologians for behaviors considered to be outrageous and unorthodox, especially at the time.

Today, the revival is considered by historians to be the primary catalyst for the spread of Pentecostalism in the 20th century.

== Background ==
=== Los Angeles ===
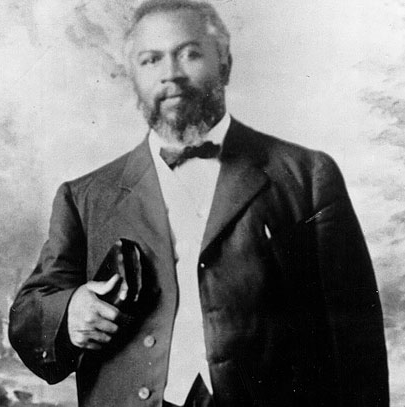
William J. Seymour, leader of the Azusa Street Revival

In 1905, William J. Seymour, a 34-year-old son of freed slaves, was a student of well-known Holiness Pentecostal preacher Charles Parham and an interim pastor for a small holiness church in Topeka, Kansas. Seymour inherited from Parham the belief that baptism with the Holy Spirit was the third work of grace, following the new birth (first work of grace) and entire sanctification (second work of grace). Neely Terry, an African American woman who attended a small holiness church pastored by Julia Hutchins in Los Angeles, made a trip to visit family in Houston late in 1905. While in Houston, she visited Seymour's church, where he preached on receiving the Holy Spirit with the evidence of speaking in other tongues, and though he had not experienced this personally, Terry was impressed with his character and message. Once home in California, Terry suggested that Seymour be invited to speak at the local church. Seymour received and accepted the invitation in February 1906, and he received financial help and a blessing from Parham for his planned one-month visit.

Seymour arrived in Los Angeles in 1906, and within two days was preaching at Julia Hutchins' church at the corner of Ninth Street and Santa Fe Avenue. During his first sermon, he preached that speaking in tongues was the first biblical evidence of the inevitable infilling in the Holy Spirit. On the following Sunday, March 4, he returned to the church and found that Hutchins had padlocked the door. Elders of the church rejected Seymour's teaching, primarily because he had not yet experienced the blessing about which he was preaching. Condemnation of his message also came from the Holiness Church Association of Southern California with which the church had affiliation. However, not all members of Hutchins' church rejected Seymour's preaching. He was invited to stay in the home of congregation member Edward S. Lee, and he began to hold Bible studies and prayer meetings there.

=== North Bonnie Brae Street ===
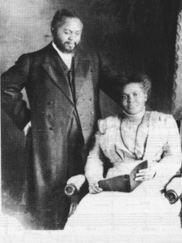
Seymour and his wife, Jennie

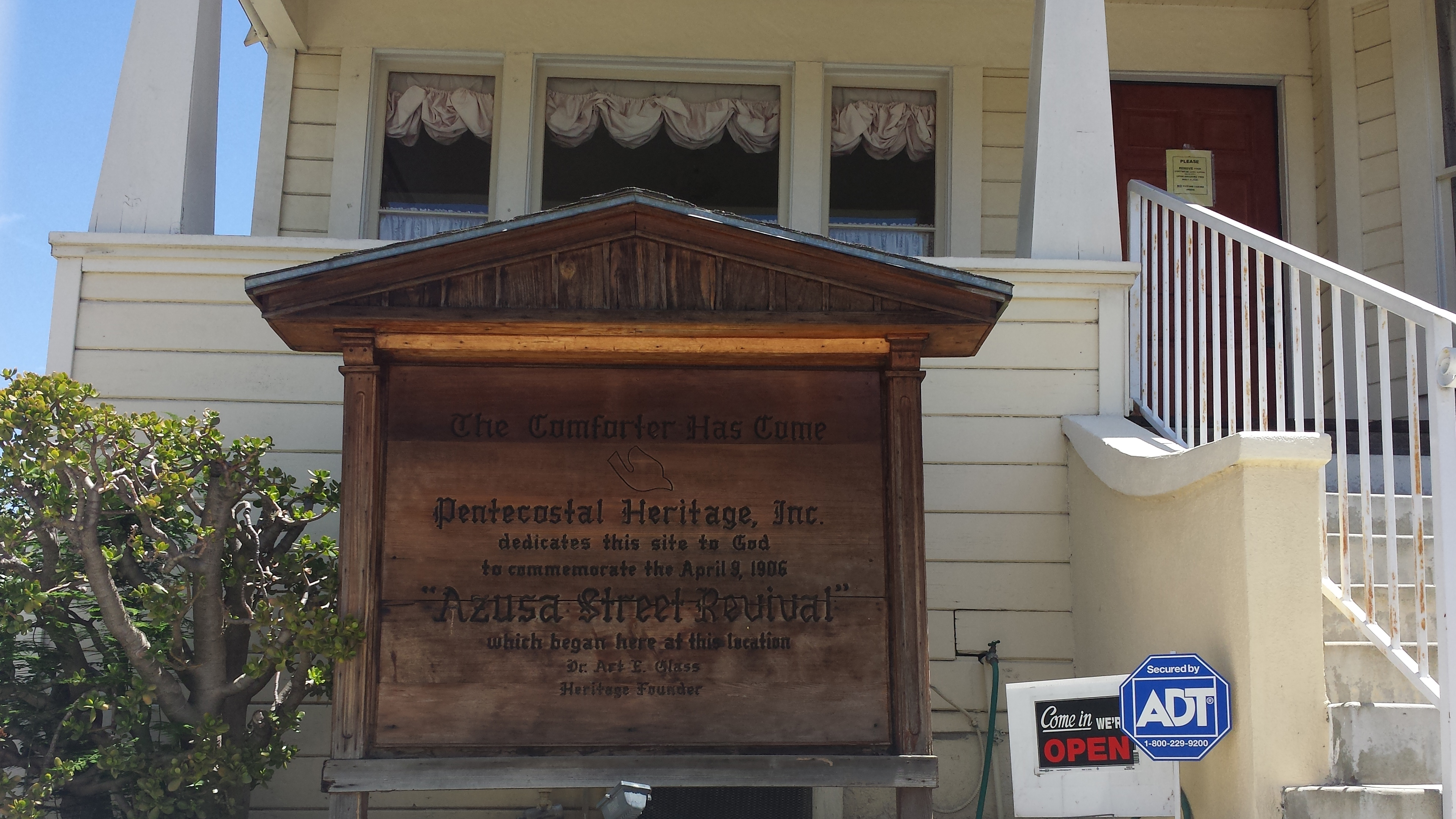
House on Bonnie Brae Street

Seymour and his small group of new followers soon relocated to the home of Richard and Ruth Asberry at 216 North Bonnie Brae Street. White families from local holiness churches began to attend as well. The group would get together regularly and pray to receive the baptism of the Holy Spirit. On April 9, 1906, after five weeks of Seymour's preaching and prayer, and three days into an intended 10-day fast, Edward S. Lee spoke in tongues for the first time. At the next meeting, Seymour shared Lee's testimony and preached a sermon on Acts 2:4 and soon six others began to speak in tongues as well, including Jennie Moore, who would later become Seymour's wife. A few days later, on April 12, Seymour spoke in tongues for the first time after praying all night long.

News of the events at North Bonnie Brae St. quickly circulated among the African American, Latino and white residents of the city, and for several nights, various speakers would preach to the crowds of curious and interested onlookers from the front porch of the Asberry home. Members of the audience included people from a broad spectrum of income levels and religious backgrounds. Hutchins eventually spoke in tongues as her whole congregation began to attend the meetings. Soon the crowds became very large and were full of people speaking in tongues, shouting, singing and moaning. Finally, the front porch collapsed, forcing the group to begin looking for a new meeting place. A resident of the neighborhood described the happenings at 216 North Bonnie Brae with the following words:

They shouted three days and three nights. It was Easter season. The people came from everywhere. By the next morning there was no way of getting near the house. As people came in they would fall under God's power; and the whole city was stirred. They shouted until the foundation of the house gave way, but no one was hurt.

== Azusa Street ==
=== Conditions ===
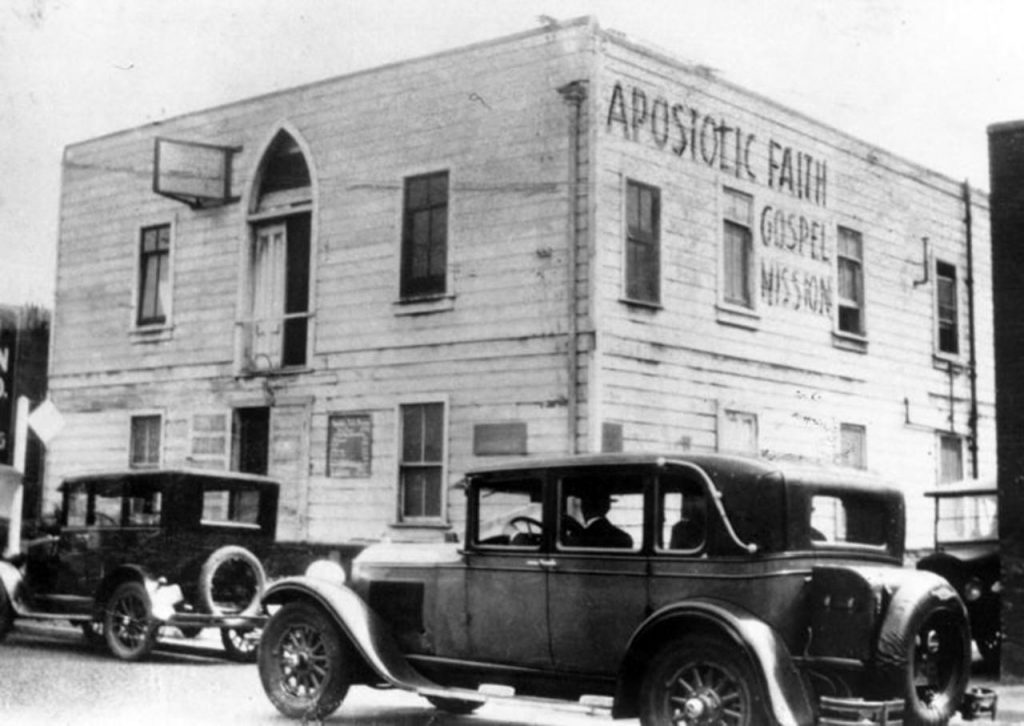
The Apostolic Faith Mission on Azusa Street, now considered to be the birthplace of Pentecostalism

The group from Bonnie Brae Street eventually discovered an available building at 312 Azusa Street (34.0483797°N 118.2411076°W) in downtown Los Angeles, which had originally been constructed as an African Methodist Episcopal Church in what was then an impoverished part of town. The rent was $8.00 per month. A newspaper referred to the downtown Los Angeles building as a "tumble down shack". Since the church had moved out, the building had served as a wholesale house, a warehouse, a lumberyard, stockyards, a tombstone shop, and had most recently been used as a stable with rooms for rent upstairs. It was a small, rectangular, flat-roofed building, approximately 60 feet (18 m) long and 40 feet (12 m) wide, totaling 2,400 square feet (220 m^{2}), sided with weathered whitewashed clapboards. The only sign that it had once been a house of God was a single Gothic-style window over the main entrance.

Discarded lumber and plaster littered the large, barn-like room on the ground floor. Nonetheless, it was secured and cleaned in preparation for services. They held their first meeting on April 14, 1906. Church services were held on the first floor where the benches were placed in a rectangular pattern. Some of the benches were simply planks put on top of empty nail kegs. There was no elevated platform, as the ceiling was only eight feet high. Initially there was no pulpit. Frank Bartleman, an early participant in the revival, recalled that "Brother Seymour generally sat behind two empty shoe boxes, one on top of the other. He usually kept his head inside the top one during the meeting, in prayer. There was no pride there.... In that old building, with its low rafters and bare floors..."

The second floor at the now-named Apostolic Faith Mission housed an office and rooms for several residents including Seymour and his new wife, Jennie. It also had a large prayer room to handle the overflow from the altar services below. The prayer room was furnished with chairs and benches made from California Redwood planks, laid end to end on backless chairs.

By mid-May 1906, anywhere from 300 to 1,500 people would attempt to fit into the building. Since horses had very recently been the residents of the building, flies constantly bothered the attendees. People from a diversity of backgrounds came together to worship: men, women, children, Black, White, Asian, Native American, immigrants, rich, poor, illiterate, and educated. People of all ages flocked to Los Angeles with both skepticism and a desire to participate. The intermingling of races and the group's encouragement of women in leadership was remarkable, as 1906 was the height of the "Jim Crow" era of racial segregation, and fourteen years prior to women receiving suffrage in the United States.

=== Services and worship ===
Worship at 312 Azusa Street was frequent and spontaneous with services going almost around the clock. Among those attracted to the revival were not only members of the Holiness Movement, but also Baptists, Mennonites, Quakers, and Presbyterians. An observer at one of the services wrote these words:

No instruments of music are used. None are needed. No choir – the angels have been heard by some in the spirit. No collections are taken. No bills have been posted to advertise the meetings. No church organization is back of it. All who are in touch with God realize as soon as they enter the meetings that the Holy Ghost is the leader.

The Los Angeles Times was not so kind in its description:

Meetings are held in a tumble-down shack on Azusa Street, and the devotees of the weird doctrine practice the most fanatical rites, preach the wildest theories and work themselves into a state of mad excitement in their peculiar zeal. Colored people and a sprinkling of whites compose the congregation, and night is made hideous in the neighborhood by the howlings of the worshippers, who spend hours swaying forth and back in a nerve racking attitude of prayer and supplication. They claim to have the "gift of tongues" and be able to understand the babel.

The first edition of the Apostolic Faith publication claimed a common reaction to the revival from visitors:

Proud, well-dressed preachers came to "investigate". Soon their high looks were replaced with wonder, then conviction comes, and very often you will find them in a short time wallowing on the dirty floor, asking God to forgive them and make them as little children.

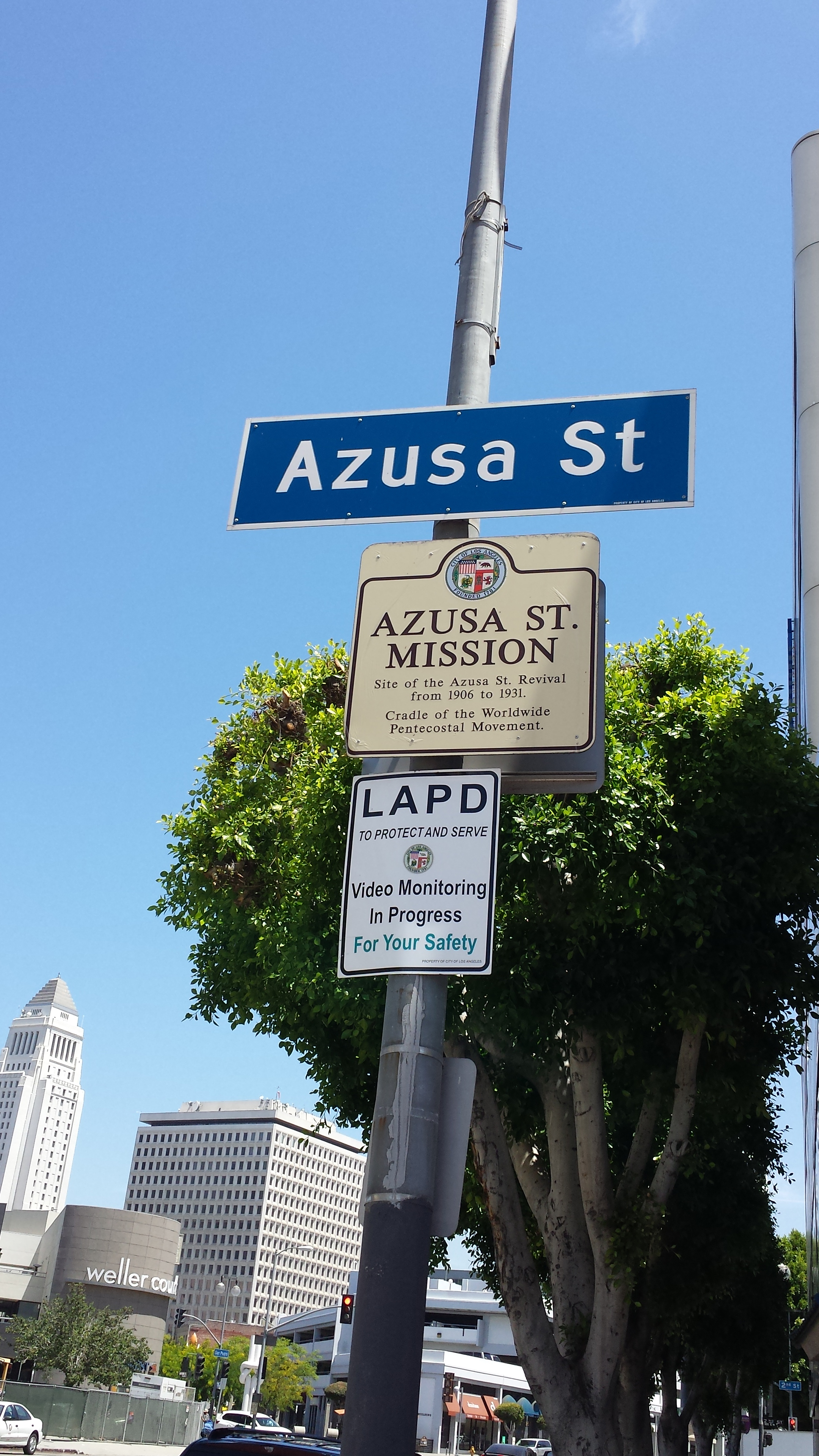
Azusa Street Historical Sign in Los Angeles, CA

Among first-hand accounts were reports of the blind having their sight restored, diseases cured instantly, and immigrants speaking in German, Yiddish, and Spanish all being spoken to in their native language by uneducated black members, who translated the languages into English by "supernatural ability".

Singing was sporadic and in a cappella or occasionally there would be singing in tongues. There were periods of extended silence. Attenders were occasionally slain in the Spirit. Visitors gave their testimony, and members read aloud testimonies that were sent to the mission by mail. There was prayer for the gift of tongues. There was prayer in tongues for the sick, for missionaries, and whatever requests were given by attenders or mailed in. There was spontaneous preaching and altar calls for salvation, sanctification and baptism of the Holy Spirit. Lawrence Catley, whose family attended the revival, said that in most services preaching consisted of Seymour opening a Bible and worshippers coming forward to preach or testify as they were led by the Holy Spirit. Many people would continually shout throughout the meetings. The members of the mission never took an offering, but there was a receptacle near the door for anyone who wanted to support the revival. The core membership of the Azusa Street Mission was never many more than 50–60 individuals, with hundreds if not thousands of people visiting or staying temporarily over the years.

=== Charles Parham ===
By October 1906, Charles Parham was invited to speak for a series of meetings at Azusa Street but was quickly un-invited.

Arriving at Azusa Street, [Parham] recoiled in disgust at the racial intermingling. He was aghast that black people were not in their "place," and simply could not abide "white people imitating unintelligent, crude negroisms of the Southland, and laying it on the Holy Ghost." Parham made his way through the crowd, stood at the pulpit, and delivered a stinging rebuke: "God is sick at his stomach!" He proceeded to explain that God would not stand for such "animalism." When it was clear that the majority of the Azusa Street Mission would not accept Parham's leadership, Parham left with an estimated two to three hundred followers and opened a rival campaign at a nearby Women's Christian Temperance Union building.

=== Criticism ===
In a skeptical front-page story titled "Weird Babel of Tongues", a Los Angeles Times reporter attempted to describe what would soon be known as the Azusa Street Revival. "Breathing strange utterances and mouthing a creed which it would seem no sane mortal could understand", the story began, "the newest religious sect has started in Los Angeles". Another local paper reporter in September 1906 described the happenings with the following words:

disgraceful intermingling of the races...they cry and make howling noises all day and into the night. They run, jump, shake all over, shout to the top of their voice, spin around in circles, fall out on the sawdust blanketed floor jerking, kicking and rolling all over it. Some of them pass out and do not move for hours as though they were dead. These people appear to be mad, mentally deranged or under a spell. They claim to be filled with the spirit. They have a one eyed, illiterate, Negro as their preacher who stays on his knees much of the time with his head hidden between the wooden milk crates. He doesn't talk very much but at times he can be heard shouting, "Repent," and he's supposed to be running the thing... They repeatedly sing the same song, "The Comforter Has Come."

The attendees were often described as "Holy Rollers", "Holy Jumpers", "Tangled Tonguers" and "Holy Ghosters". Reports were published throughout the U.S. and the world of the strange happenings in Los Angeles.

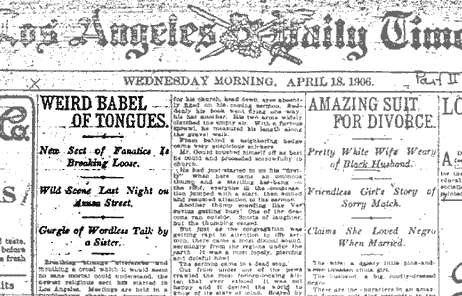
LA Times article criticizing the behavior of the revivalists at Azusa Street.

Christians from many traditions were critical, saying the movement was hyper-emotional, misused Scripture and lost focus on Christ by overemphasizing the Holy Spirit. Within a short time ministers were warning their congregations to stay away from the Azusa Street Mission. Some called the police and tried to get the building shut down.

=== Apostolic Faith publication ===
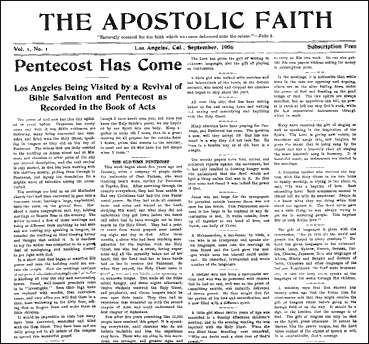
Headline of the first ever publication of the Apostolic Faith, from September 1906

Also starting in September 1906 was the publication of the revival's own newsletter, the Apostolic Faith. Issues were published occasionally up until May 1908, mostly through the work of Seymour and a white woman named Clara Lum, a member of the Apostolic Faith Mission. The Apostolic Faith was distributed without charge, and thousands of laypersons and ministers received copies worldwide. Five thousand copies of the first edition were printed, and by 1907 the press run reached over 40,000.

The Apostolic Faith publication reported the happenings at the Azusa Street Mission to the world. Its first issue's lead story was titled "Pentecost has Come". It contained a letter from Charles Parham, an article on Pentecost from Acts, and a series of anecdotes of people's experience within the revival. One edition in 1907 wrote, "One token of the Lord's coming is that He is melting all races and nations together, and they are filled with the power and glory of God. He is baptizing by one spirit into one body and making up a people that will be ready to meet Him when He comes". The Apostolic Faith brought increasing attention to the happenings at Azusa Street and the fledgling movement that was emerging from the revival.

== Legacy ==
By 1913, the revival at Azusa Street had lost momentum, and most of the media attention and crowds had left by 1915. Seymour remained there with his wife, Jennie, for the rest of their lives as pastors of the small African American congregation, though he often made short trips to help establish other smaller revivals later in life. After Seymour died of a heart attack on September 28, 1922, Jennie led the church until 1931, when the congregation lost the building.

=== Sending of missionaries ===
As The Apostolic Faith and many secular reports advertised the events of the Azusa Street Revival internationally, thousands of individuals visited the mission in order to witness it firsthand. At the same time, thousands of people were leaving Azusa Street with intentions of evangelizing abroad. Reverend K. E. M. Spooner visited the revival in 1909 and became one of the Pentecostal Holiness Church's most effective missionaries in Africa, working among the Tswana people of Botswana.

A. G. Garr and his wife were sent from Azusa Street as missionaries to Calcutta, India, where they managed to start a small revival. Speaking in tongues in India did not enable them to speak the native language, Bengali. The Garrs later traveled to China where they arrived in Hong Kong and began to spread Pentecostalism in mainland China. They did this by working through other Protestant churches and organizations that had already been established. Garr significantly contributed to early Pentecostalism through his later work in redefining the "biblical evidence" doctrine and changing the doctrine from a belief that speaking in tongues was explicitly for evangelism to a belief that speaking in tongues was a gift for "spiritual empowerment".

Missionary Bernt Bernsten traveled to the area from North China to investigate the happenings after hearing that the biblical prophecy of Acts 2:4 was being fulfilled. Other visitors left the revival to become missionaries in remote areas all over the world. So many missionaries went out from Azusa (some thirty-eight left in October 1906) that within two years the movement had spread to over fifty nations, including Britain, Scandinavia, Germany, Holland, Egypt, Syria, Palestine, South Africa, Hong Kong, China, Ceylon and India. Christian leaders visited from all over the world.

=== Birth of Pentecostal movement ===
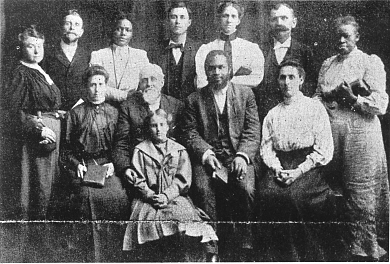
The leaders of the Apostolic Faith Mission. Seymour is front row, second from the right; Jennie is back row, third from left.

By the end of 1906, most leaders from Azusa Street had spun off to form other congregations, such as the Apostolic Faith Church, 51st Street Apostolic Faith Mission, the Spanish AFM, and the Italian Pentecostal Mission. These missions were largely composed of immigrant or ethnic groups. The Southeast United States was a particularly prolific area of growth for the movement, since Seymour's approach gave a useful explanation for a charismatic spiritual climate that had already been taking root in those areas. Other new missions were based on preachers who had charisma and energy. Nearly all of these new churches were founded among immigrants and the poor.

Many existing Wesleyan-holiness denominations adopted the Pentecostal message, such as the Church of God in Christ and the Pentecostal Holiness Church, and are now Holiness Pentecostal denominations. Holiness Pentecostals, such as the Apostolic Faith Church, affirm three works of grace: (1) New Birth, (2) entire sanctification, and (3) Baptism with the Holy Ghost. The formation of new denominations also occurred, motivated by doctrinal differences between Holiness Pentecostals and their Finished Work Pentecostal counterparts, such as the Assemblies of God formed in 1914 and the Pentecostal Church of God formed in 1919—these represent Finished Work Pentecostal denominations. An early doctrinal controversy led to a split between Trinitarian and Oneness Pentecostals, the latter founded the Pentecostal Assemblies of the World in 1916 and the United Pentecostal Church in 1945.

The Azusa Street Revival is commonly regarded as the beginning of the modern-day Pentecostal Movement. Today, there are more than 500 million Pentecostal and charismatic believers across the globe.
