= Grady R. Kent =

American theologian (1909–1964)

- Born: Grady Kent; April 26, 1909; Rosebud, Georgia, U.S.
- Died: March 31, 1964 (aged 54); Cleveland, Tennessee, U.S.
- Occupations: General Overseer; Bishop; Pastor; Evangelist
- Religion: Pentecostal Christian
- Ordained: Church of God of Prophecy, and later The Church of God (Jerusalem Acres)
- Congregations served: The Church of God at Jerusalem Acres, Cleveland, TN
- Offices held: CPMA Director, Church of God of Prophecy (1943–1957); General Overseer, The Church of God (Jerusalem Acres) (1957–1964)
- Title: Bishop
- Website: Official website

Grady R. Kent (April 26, 1909 – March 31, 1964) was an American theologian and preacher who worked closely with A.J. Tomlinson in the early years of Church of God of Prophecy, and later went on to establish The Church of God (Jerusalem Acres). His life included the formation of numerous material programs like the Fields of the Wood and the Joel's Horsemen Christian motorcycle group, which he used to spread the message of the church.

== Early life ==
Grady R. Kent was born in 1909 to a farming family in Rosebud, Georgia. From a young age he expressed an unusual interest in scripture, and in particular the Book of Revelation. At the age of ten he joined the Methodist Church following what he described as an "unction" from God. Feeling the need to be involved in the church, he took a job as a janitor, earning $3.50 per month. By the age of thirteen he had come to feel that the Methodist Church didn't hold all the answers that he was looking for, and his interest in the Book of Revelation continued to grow. At age sixteen, the young Grady took a job as a laborer in the textile mills in Thomson, Georgia and began to have Bible studies with a group of young men from his church, but found it to be passionless and still lacking the answers that he'd hoped to find. By age seventeen he had begun to dabble in gambling and drinking, and eventually these became significant problems for the man who had lost hope in finding answers in the Bible. Also at age seventeen, he married Eunice Moate, who would stay faithfully by his side for the rest of his life.

His days as a rough and rowdy young man were short-lived, and he considered his moment of salvation to have come when a friend invited him to go visit a Holiness Pentecostal church in the town of Griffin, Georgia wherein he heard his first message preached on the process of Salvation, Sanctification and Baptism with the Holy Spirit. The Minister was named James Cox, and in hearing him speak, Grady would later say that he kept thinking to himself, "this is what I've been looking for."

== Ministry ==
Grady considered his real calling to the ministry to have come in the form of a vision wherein he saw the form of the courthouse of his local town transform into something more like a temple, with doors to the north, south, east and west. He wrote that in this vision he saw many people standing far off weeping, but when they saw him holding a small book they began to rejoice. From this point forward he decided that he would dedicate his life fully to the message of the Bible. He was shortly thereafter filled with the Holy Ghost at a revival conducted by a woman named Maude Loggin, and subsequently began to preach a message of repentance and spiritual empowerment.

=== Church of God of Prophecy ===
When Grady Kent received the Baptism of the Holy Spirit he began searching for a people that were committed to a full Bible message. He would come to find what he had been looking for in the Church of God of Prophecy. In 1939, While he was conducting a revival in the small town of Egan, GA, Grady was kidnapped by members of the Ku Klux Klan and subsequently beaten nearly to death with whips, and left in the woods to die. He managed to survive, but this account reached the ears of then Presiding Bishop of the Church of God of Prophecy, A.J. Tomlinson. After meeting Grady, Bishop Tomlinson offered him a job as the pastor of the Cleveland, TN church. In 1943 brother Kent was appointed head of the CPMA and began building the White Angel Fleet -A gospel aviation corps. By the time he left the COGOP in 1957, this fleet had grown to a number near 100 airplanes and 200 pilots. After the passing of A.J. Tomlinson in October 1943, Bishop Tomlinson's son, M.A. Tomlinson succeeded him as presiding Bishop. In 1957 disagreements between Grady and M.A. concerning changes that were being made to the church governmental structure and matters of doctrine came to a head. Grady Kent and a fair faction of the Church of God of Prophecy split off to form The Church of God (Jerusalem Acres).

=== The Church of God (Jerusalem Acres) ===
In 1957 Grady Kent was asked to resign from The Church of God of Prophecy and went on to form The Church of God with headquarters at Jerusalem Acres. According to the "History" section of The Church of God (Jerusalem Acres)' Manual of Apostles' Doctrine, within days of his resignation, about 300 individuals had opted to leave the COGOP to stand with Bishop Kent, and within the following years the number grew to several thousand members. He immediately began publishing The Vision Speaks Church Newspaper, which remains the official publication of The Church of God. With this he was able to gain support and declare his vision for the church. In 1958, he began building a new airplane program as part of the "Church Marker's Association", as well as a Church motorcycle corps named Joel's Horsemen and other similar material programs. During his tenure as Presiding Bishop of The Church of God (Jerusalem Acres), Bishop Kent held fast to the ideals of theocratic government, and the church he founded still espouses these ideals today.
