= Church of God (Jerusalem Acres) =

Holiness Pentecostal body

The Church of God (Jerusalem Acres)
- Orientation: Holiness Pentecostal / New Testament Judaism
- Theology: Holiness Pentecostalism, Sabbath-keeping, Biblical calendar observation
- Polity: Theocratic government / Episcopal (12 Apostles, 72 Prophets, 7 Men of Wisdom)
- Leader: Bishop H. David Lam
- Headquarters: Cleveland, Tennessee
- Territory: Worldwide (United States, Mexico, Haiti, Liberia, Zambia, Argentina, Tanzania, India, Philippines)
- Founder: Grady R. Kent
- Separated from: Church of God of Prophecy
- Separations: The Church of God (John A. Looper split, 1996)
- Members: 35,000
- Official website: thechurchofgodntj.org

The Church of God is a holiness Pentecostal body that descends from the Christian Union movement of Richard Spurling, A. J. Tomlinson and others. They consider themselves officially The Church of God, but also designate themselves as The Church of God (1957 Reformation) and The Church of God (Jerusalem Acres), which is the name of their headquarters.

== History ==
The Church of God at Jerusalem Acres shares its early history with the Church of God of Prophecy. After A. J. Tomlinson formed the Church of Prophecy Markers Association in 1941, he appointed Grady R. Kent head over it in 1943. After Tomlinson's death, his son Milton was appointed General Overseer, but Kent remained a forceful preacher and influential leader. In 1948, the Church of God of Prophecy adopted a resolution making the General Assembly the highest authority in the church. This helped set the stage for division. Some members within the church accepted the practice of theocratic government, with the Bishop or General Overseer ruling the church.

In 1957 Grady R. Kent went out of the Church of God of Prophecy and formed The Church of God, which adopted its name in 1958. The church was "reorganized" in Cherokee, North Carolina, on February 17, 1957. On August 1, 1958, a seven-acre (28,000 m^{2}) tract of land was purchased in Cleveland, Tennessee, and the church undertook a project similar to the Fields of the Wood, which is owned by the Church of God of Prophecy. Great authority was placed in "theocratic government" and the Chief Bishop, who was responsible for ruling the church. Bishop Kent died on March 31, 1964, of cancer of the nose. He refused medical treatment for the cancer until just before death, preferring to rely on a prayer vigil conducted by a rotating team of his 12 Apostles. Several other Bishops have presided over the church since then, and in 1996, another split happened with Bishop John A Looper leaving the church after disagreements over doctrinal issues. Bishop Lavell Craig, as of March 2017, is the Presiding Bishop (they no longer use the term "Chief Bishop"). Under former Presiding Bishop Samuel Kramer's leadership, the church has fully returned to a Sabbath-keeping service schedule which had largely been abandoned under Looper's administration. The church has expanded and continues to grow in Haiti, Liberia, Zambia, Mexico, Argentina, Tanzania, India, and the Philippines.

== Faith and practice ==
The faith and practice of The Church of God at Jerusalem Acres is similar to the related Church of God bodies, but with more of a "Jewish" flavor, which they call "New Testament Judaism". Because the church believes that Judaism is God's plan of worship, "New Testament Judaism" reflects the fact that Jesus came to reform Judaism, not to destroy it. In fact this body is often identified, and occasionally self-identified, as The Church of God (New Testament Judaism). This body teaches theocratic government and teaches that the whole Bible is the inspired word of God; salvation by accepting Jesus as Saviour; the seventh-day Sabbath; the nine gifts of the Spirit and five gifts of ministry; and the post-tribulational premillennial return of Jesus Christ. While the group accepts prophecy as ongoing today, they believe that modern prophets are fallible, and therefore modern prophecies are not considered equal with the Bible.

=== Biblical feast days ===
The Church of God at Jerusalem Acres does not celebrate traditional holidays which were introduced by the Roman Catholic Church, such as Christmas, Easter, and All Saints Day. Their church calendar is based on the Hebrew calendar. They observe or celebrate a number of days, some of which are peculiar to their denomination. For example:

- Reformation Day – February 13, the day the church was reformed from apostasy. Reformation Day is a celebration of the day when The Church of God (Jerusalem Acres) we officially reorganized, following their split with the Church of God of Prophecy in 1957. It was at this point that Bishop Grady R. Kent made a stand for a concept called "theocratic government" that had previously been inherent in the doctrine of the Church of God of Prophecy. When the Church of God of Prophecy decided to transition to a form of government led by committee rather than an Anointed Leader, Bishop Kent took a stand for their Biblical tradition and was forced to resign. A fair number of churches followed with him and they became The Church of God (Jerusalem Acres).
- Passover – 14th of Abib (Jewish month); the New Testament Passover includes the observance of the Memorial Supper and feet washing.
- Pentecost – the feast of 50 days after the day of Wave Sheaf; the church celebrates this day "in much the same manner in which the early church observed it in Acts 2..." This is also the time of their General Assembly, in which members from their churches travel to Cleveland, Tennessee for a week-long gathering and special service schedule.
- Arise, Shine Day – June 13, the day A. J. Tomlinson "found" the Church of God; (June 13, 1903)
- Feast of Tabernacles, which they recognize as the time of the birth of Jesus Christ, in the Jewish month, Tishri

The Church of God at Jerusalem Acres observes the seventh-day (Saturday) Sabbath, citing that the Bible states that this was the custom of both Jesus and Paul.

=== Theocratic government ===
Theocratic government is the system of governance used by The Church of God. In this system, the Church is led by an Anointed Leader, often referred to as the Presiding Bishop (Presently Bishop Lavell Craig), who is considered to be the "good steward" who is commanded to give the church their "meat (or revelation) in due season". In addition to the Presiding Bishop, Church government consists of twelve modern Apostles, Seven Businessmen and Seventy-Two Prophets, who oversee the works of the other bishops and deacons of the Church. Ministers are all welcome to participate in the discussion and any voting during the annual Minister's Council, but only ministers who have attained the level of Deacon or Bishop are allowed to present papers or subjects for discussion which may lead to a change in doctrine or procedure.

=== Seven business auxiliaries ===
The Church of God considers all of the business of the church to fall under one of seven categories for each of which they have a corresponding business auxiliary. These categories are considered to be the seven distinct workings of the Holy Spirit (or the Seven Spirits of God), which they give the names "Love, Preservation, Marking, Teaching, Perfection, Publishing and Evangelism". The corresponding auxiliaries, in the same order, are "World Missions Auxiliary, Church Preservation Endeavor, Church Marking Association, Bible Teaching Auxiliary, Church Perfection Auxiliary, Church Publishing Company and Church Evangelistic Auxiliary".

== Status ==
As of 2026, The Church of God at Jerusalem Acres had 17 churches in the United States, in addition to churches in Mexico, Cuba, Haiti, Dominican Republic, South America, Africa, India and the Philippines. They have an estimated membership of 35,000 worldwide, and developing contacts in Russia, Ukraine, and Canada. Their headquarters are located at Jerusalem Acres in Cleveland, Tennessee which is the location for several other Church of God denominations.

== Sources ==
- Encyclopedia of American Religions, J. Gordon Melton, editor
- Handbook of Denominations in the United States, by Frank S. Mead
- Profiles in Belief: the Religious Bodies of the United States and Canada (Vol. III), by Arthur Carl Piepkorn
- Manual of Apostles Doctrine and Procedure of The Church of God, Section IV, E
