= List of colleges and seminaries affiliated with the Church of God (Cleveland) =

This is a list of Postsecondary educational institutions affiliated with the Church of God (Cleveland).

== Christian Service School ==
A Christian Service School is an institution designed to offer basic Christian service training to ministers and laity. The school may function in a local church under the guidance of the pastor or one whom he appoints.

- Harvest Church of God Bible School, Addis Ababa, Ethiopia
- Arabic International Theological Seminary, Vancouver, British Columbia, Canada
- Full Gospel School of Theology, Wukari, Nigeria
- London School of Ministries, Southall, Middlesex, England
- Mt. Zion School of Ministry, Saint Thomas, United States Virgin Islands

== Bible Institute ==
A Bible Institute offers postsecondary or college-level education and training to individuals preparing for Christian ministry. The education focuses on extensive biblical knowledge, combined with a training emphasis on practical application. The institute functions under the auspices of the denomination upon recommendation of the Division of Education.

- Church of God School of Ministry, Cleveland, Tennessee
- Bethel Bible College, Lusaka, Zambia
- Bible Training Center Dar es Salaam, Dar es Salaam, Tanzania
- Centro de Formación Ministerial, Limón, Costa Rica
- International Bible Institute, Roadtown, Tortola, British Virgin Islands
- Latvian School of Christian Ministries, Jelgava, Latvia
- Leadership Training Center, Northampton, England
- Scuola Biblica Italiana, (European Theological Seminary extension), Palermo, Italy
- Seminario Bíblico Pentecostal - Central, Quetzaltenango, Guatemala
- Instituto Teológico FIDE, Madrid, Spain

== Degree-Granting Institution ==
A degree-granting institution is one which offers college-level programs of study leading to a baccalaureate degree or its equivalent. This normally requires 120 semester credits with a general education core and a major area of study or its equivalent in the context of each respective institution.

- Full Gospel Church of God College, Irene, South Africa
- Faculdad Argentina de Estudios Teológicos, Buenos Aires, Argentina
- Eurasian Theological Seminary(ETSM), Moscow, Russia
- Discipleship College, Eldoret, Kenya
- Northern Luzon Theological College and Seminary – Isabela Campus, Isabela, Philippines
- Indian Theological Seminary, Chengannur, India
- Bulgarian Theological College, Stara Zagora, Bulgaria
- Bethel Bible College, Mandeville, Jamaica
- Barbados Bible College, Bridgetown, Barbados
- Full Gospel School of Theology, Abak, Nigeria
- Instituto Biblico Panameño, Panama City, Panama
- Mahanaim Bible College, Mumbai, India
- Mount Zion Bible College(Hosting master's degree program from ASCM, Manila, Philippines), Chengannur, India
- Pan African Christian University College, Winnaba, Ghana
- Seminaire Theologique de L’Eglise de Dieu en Haiti(STEDH)(Hosting master's degree program from Pentecostal Theological Seminary), Port-au-Prince, Haïti
- Seminario Bíblico Pentecostal de Centroamérica(SEBIPCA)(Hosting master's degree program from Lee University), Quetzaltenango, Guatemala
- Seminario Bíblico Ministerial Argentina(SEBIMA), Buenos Aires, Argentina
- Seminario Bíblico Teológico de la Iglesia de Dios(SEBID), Santo Domingo, Dominican Republic
- Seminario Teológico Ministerial, Santiago, Chile
- Tamil Nadu Bible College, Tamil Nadu, India

== Graduate Degree-Granting Institution ==
A graduate degree-granting Institution is a college, seminary, or university, offering postgraduate degrees. Level IV certification is available only to those institutions which independently grant said degrees. If an institution hosts a graduate program from another institution, this alone does not meet the criteria for a Level IV certification. When an institution offers a master's degree program, it may be certified only when 100 percent of the resident faculty members teaching at the master's level have appropriate academic credentials.

- Lee University, Cleveland, Tennessee
- Pentecostal Theological Seminary(ETS), Cleveland, Tennessee
- European Theological Seminary, Kniebis, Germany
- Asian Seminary of Christian Ministries, Manila, Philippines
- Bethel Theological Seminary, Jakarta, Indonesia
- Gilgal Biblical Seminary, Sharjah, Dubai, United Arab Emirates
- L.E.E. Community College, Singapore
- Pentecostal Theological Institute, Bucharest, Romania
- Seminario Bíblico Mexicano(SEBIME), Hermosillo, Mexico
- Seminario Evangélico da Igreja de Deus(SEID), Goiana, Brazil
- Seminario Ministerial Sudamericano(SEMISUD), Quito, Ecuador
- Universidad Teológica del Caribe(UTC), St. Just, Puerto Rico
