= Harrison Poteat =

American religious worker

Harrison W. Poteat was an American religious worker, an overseer for the Church of God in the northeast for over 20 years. He was overseer of the church in Maine until 1923. After the 1923 division of the Church of God (Cleveland) and the Church of God of Prophecy, he served as overseer over six northeastern states for the Cleveland-based body.

In 1933 he established the work of the Church of God (Cleveland) on Prince Edward Island; and in 1939, he founded the Church of God, House of Prayer.
