= Theocratic government =

Form of ecclesiastical polity

Theocratic government is a form of ecclesiastical polity that has been historically associated with the teachings of A.J. Tomlinson and Grady R. Kent. It was previously employed in Church of God and Church of God of Prophecy and now only remains in use with The Church of God (Jerusalem Acres) and a few smaller organizations. It was designed to be patterned after the same form of government used in the Bible by Moses and Jesus. It consists of an Anointed Leader at the head, Twelve Apostles, Seven Business Overseers, and Seventy-Two Prophets, in addition to having various bishops, deacons and ministers serving under them.

== History ==
In 1903, A.J. Tomlinson was appointed as the overseer of a group that would come to call themselves Church of God. Rather than simply accept the common forms of polity being used by other churches, he felt it was necessary to search the scriptures in order to find the proper mode of church governance. Once the movement of the Church of God began to spread, he was able to implement what he had been learning, and between the years of 1914 and 1920, he built up the Church according to the pattern that he would later term theocratic government.

== Structure ==
The Structure of the government of a church using theocratic government is not truly autocratic, in that some level of authority remains with a council of Apostles and Elders. However, the structure does flow down from a single Anointed Leader who after hearing the arguments of the council reserves the right to make an executive decision and is the final authority on all matters of Doctrine and Practice in the Church.

=== The Anointed Leader ===
The Anointed Leader (often called the Chief Bishop) is the head of the Church and is the final authority on matters of church policy and practice. He is seen as the embodiment of the Good Steward who is expected to give the church a regular dose of revelation or direction. Recognizing that the Bible says that "without vision the people perish" (Proverbs 29:18), it is the Presiding Bishop's duty to provide a vision for his people to follow. The basis for the anointed leader is founded on the principle that Moses was anointed with God's Spirit to lead the Israelites, and later this anointing was passed on to Joshua, and continued throughout the history of the Bible. When Jesus came, he became the Anointed Leader of the Church, which was called Israel according to the Spirit. Bishop Tomlinson taught, as The Church of God (Jerusalem Acres) continues to teach, that James -rather than Peter- was the Anointed Leader of the first century church following the ascension of Christ. He based this concept on the fact that at the end of the Council of Jerusalem (Acts chapter 15), it was James who rendered the final verdict; noting that he only did so after hearing all sides of the argument from Peter, Paul and others.

=== The Twelve Apostles ===
Under theocratic government, it is stated that according to Ephesians 4:11-13, there would be a need for Apostles in the Church until the return of Christ. It is recognized that while there is a ministerial gift of an Apostle, such as Paul and Timothy had, it was also important to the early church to have twelve Apostles as part of the church Government. This is why in the first chapter of The Book of Acts, the first century church replaced Judas Iscariot with Matthias after the former had committed suicide. The use of twelve leaders is also consistent with the fact that Moses, Joshua and many others appointed twelve leaders as representatives of each of the tribes of Israel. Thus it is considered to be a doctrine consistent with the whole Bible.

=== The Seven Businessmen ===
In the system that Tomlinson initially created there were at various times either five or seven Business administrators in the church, the proper number was eventually decided to be Seven in keeping with the number appointed in Acts 6. These men are also considered the seven pillars of Wisdom's house found in Proverbs 9:1, and are the heads of the business auxiliaries of the church, each of which is said to embody the mission of one of the Seven Spirits of God. In the doctrine brought by Kent and Tomlinson, the Seven Spirits of God were identified individually with one of the messages to the Seven Churches of Asia.

=== The Seventy-Two Prophets ===
In the theocratic government structure used by Kent and previously by Tomlinson, there was a recognition that the Bible states that Moses had gathered seventy elders of the children of Israel to be anointed with the Holy Spirit, and when this happened, there were another two who also were anointed within the camp (Numbers 11:24-26), and in similar manner, Jesus had appointed Seventy-two prophets to go out ahead of him into the towns he was preparing to enter (Luke 10:1). Keeping with this tradition, they proceeded to appoint seventy-two elders or prophets to the hierarchy of their respective church organizations.

=== Additional ministries ===
Theocratic government typically also includes the use of ministers who aren't part of the "pattern" government, in the form of bishops and deacons, along with local pastors and evangelists who may or may not hold any higher title of ministry.

== Sources ==
- Manual of Apostles Doctrine and Procedure of The Church of God: Section I, D,2: "History"
- Manual of Apostles Doctrine and Procedure of The Church of God: Section II: "Governmental Structure"
