= Latter Rain Church =

Latter Rain Church May refer to:

- Latter Rain (1880s movement)
- Latter Rain (post–World War II movement)
