= Latter Rain (1880s movement) =

Latter Rain Movement
- Classification: Protestant
- Founder: R. G. Spurling, Sr.
- Origin: 1886 North Carolina and Tennessee

The Latter Rain Movement was a late nineteenth-century radical Holiness theology and Revivalist phenomenon which began in western North Carolina and eastern Tennessee. Elements of the movement gave rise to and merged with what would become incipient modern Pentecostalism.

== History ==
The Latter Rain Movement began in western North Carolina and eastern Tennessee among groups of disaffected Baptists and Methodists. The movement was spread throughout the area by Baptist preacher Richard G. Spurling, Sr., and the use of "Latter Rain" to describe the movement originated at this time. Considerable opposition from other Baptists arose, and a distinctive identity emerged. At a Holiness revival meeting in Monroe County, Tennessee, during 1886 the movement coalesced with the formation of the Christian Union.

Spurling, Sr., was joined by his son Richard G. Spurling Jr, and by Methodist preacher W. F. Bryant.

Spurling, Jr., held a revival in his Baptist church in Liberty, Tennessee, during 1892 during which some members spoke in tongues. This resulted in Spurling's expulsion along with some 30 of the congregation. They began meeting at the home of W. F. Bryant in nearby Camp Creek (Cherokee County, North Carolina). From this, the Holiness Church was organized by Spurling, Bryant and Frank Porter. This church became the organizational hub of the rapidly spreading movement.

Ambrose J. Tomlinson, then a colporteur, came in contact with the Camp Creek Holiness Church in 1896. He accepted it as representing the New Testament pattern, and in 1903 he joined it as a preacher. Spurling, Jr., and William F. Bryant, even though they remained respected figures, gradually gave way to Tomlinson's strong influence.

Tomlinson eventually assumed clear leadership of the movement and began drawing together many of the earlier Latter Rain congregations. In 1906, he held the first annual Assembly of the movement at Camp Creek. The next year he moved it to Union Grove, closer to his home in Cleveland, Tennessee. In 1907, he also changed the name from Holiness Church to The Church of God, and began preaching at revivals nationwide and drawing other congregations to the movement. Similar revivals began taking place at this time, including those at Topeka, Kansas, under Charles Fox Parham, and Azusa Street in Los Angeles under William J. Seymour. Together, these became known as "The Outpouring of the Latter Rain".

In 1908, the headquarters of the Church of God were moved to Cleveland, Tennessee, and in 1909 Tomlinson was elected its General Overseer of the Church of God denomination. Even though Tomlinson had been successful in gathering together many congregations which identified with the Latter Rain Movement, this unity was temporary and schisms began to occur almost immediately. Tomlinson himself was later expelled.

== Doctrine ==
The beliefs held by the group contained variations, depending on time and place. In the early days, the movement saw itself as non-denominational and sought to bring all other denominations under its umbrella to reconstitute a universal Church. Certain shared doctrines have been noted, which include a conviction that the group exhibits a restoration of the primitive pattern followed by the New Testament Church. The group also frequently proclaimed Dispensationalist themes and held to many of the same precepts as the Holiness movement. A doctrine of holiness as being a work arising out of grace, but following justification, seems also to figure in early sermons.

The term "Latter Rain" itself indicates a belief that the Last Days have come upon the world. In accordance to the verses in Joel 2:23-29 in which the term "Latter Rain" occurs, there was a prominent acceptance and encouragement of Spirit baptism, speaking in tongues, prophecy, miracles and other spiritual gifts.

== See also ==
- Shearer Schoolhouse Revival
- Latter Rain (post-World War II movement)

== Bibliography ==
=== References ===
- Clark, Elmer T. 1949. The Small Sects in America: Their Historical, Theological, and Psychological Background. Nashville, Tennessee: Abingdon Press.
- Jackson, Samuel Macauley; Lefferts Augustine Loetscher. 1977. The New Schaff-Herzog Encyclopedia of Religious Knowledge, volume 14. Grand Rapids, Michigan: Baker Book House. ISBN 0-8010-7947-0
- Mayer, Frederick Emanuel; Arthur Carl Piepkorn. 1961. The Religious Bodies of America , edition 7. St. Louis, Missouri: Concordia Publishing House.
- Robins, R. G. 2004. A.J. Tomlinson: Plainfolk Modernist. New York, New York: Oxford University Press. ISBN 0-19-516591-8
- Shulman, Albert M. 1981. The Religious Heritage of America. South Brunswick, New Jersey: A. S. Barnes. ISBN 0-498-02162-9
- Wacker, Grant. 2003. Heaven Below: Early Pentecostals and American Culture. Cambridge, Massachusetts: Harvard University Press. ISBN 0-674-01128-7
