= The Church of God, Alexander Jackson Sr. General Overseer =

The Church of God
- Classification: Pentecostal
- Orientation: Holiness Pentecostal
- Official website: www.tcogonline.org

The Church of God is a Holiness Pentecostal Christian denomination with roots in the late 19th-century American Holiness movement and early 20th-century Pentecostal revival. It shares a common history with The Church of God (Charleston, Tennessee) (TCOG) until 2006 when a separation occurred. The official name is The Church of God. The phrase Alexander Jackson Sr. General Overseer is added to distinguish this group from many others called Church of God.

The Church of God claims a membership from many states in the United States and 24 nations worldwide. The official publication of The Church of God, The Arise Shine, is printed monthly in Cleveland, Tennessee and sent out internationally. The church's general headquarters are located in Cleveland, Tennessee.

== History ==
=== Origins ===
The Church of God developed from a movement led by Richard Spurling and Ambrose Jessup Tomlinson which would become in 1903 the Church of God. Throughout its history the Church of God movement has experienced a number of divisions. In 1923, Tomlinson was impeached as General Overseer of the Church of God (Cleveland, Tennessee). This caused a part of the church to separate and form the Church of God of Prophecy which continued to be led by Tomlinson. In 1943, he was succeeded by his son Milton Ambrose Tomlinson who served as General Overseer until his retirement in 1990.

That year during the election of M. A. Tomlinson's successor, another schism occurred. One group within the Church of God of Prophecy declared that the selection process of Tomlinson's successor was a departure from what had historically been perceived as "theocratic government" within the body's governing structure and procedure. In 1993, this group called for a "solemn assembly", borrowing an Old Testament term for corporate devotion to prayer to rhetorically emphasize its earnestness. Coincidentally, the "solemn assembly" resulted in the formation of The Church of God (Charleston, Tennessee). Robert J. Pruitt was chosen to be the new overseer, and he remained so until 2006, when age-related disability prompted his retirement.

=== 2006 Continuation ===
Once again division characterized the succession process. A meeting of leadership of The Church of God (Charleston, Tennessee) during the summer of 2006 ended with the selection of Stephen Smith as the interim General Overseer. In September of the same year during the 101st General Assembly of TCOG (Charleston, Tennessee), Stephen Smith was selected to be the organizations General Overseer, after not vacating the office of Interim General Overseer.

There was then a group of people who chose to remove themselves from the Church of God (Charleston, Tennessee) and continue as The Church of God over which Bishop James C. Nabors is General Overseer. During a meeting on September 3, 2006, at the Tivoli Auditorium, Bishop James C. Nabors was chosen to be the General Overseer of a new organization. Bishop James C. Nabors previously had been administrative assistant and field secretary to the former general overseer of The Church of God (Charleston), Robert J. Pruitt. In 2009 Bishop James C. Nabors was removed as General Overseer. In 2009 Bishop Alexander Jackson Sr. was selected by unanimous agreement by the Overseers during a called meeting in order to act as the Interim General Overseer.

During that same year (2009) Bishop Alexander Jackson Sr. vacated the office of Interim General Overseer during the General Assembly. During this same Assembly he was chosen by unanimous agreement by those present that he would continue as General Overseer. At the present moment Bishop Alexander Jackson Sr. is the General Overseer of The Church of God. In 2015 their new Assembly Tabernacle was dedicated in the City of Cleveland, TN where each church event internationally would be held.

== Beliefs ==
The Church of God is a Pentecostal church in the Wesleyan-Holiness tradition. It believes that one is saved or born again as a result of repentance, justification and regeneration. After one is saved, a second work of grace (sanctification) makes living a holy life possible. The church is opposed to the use of tobacco, alcohol and drugs; opposed to membership in secret societies; opposed to wearing jewelry and other ornamentation; and against divorce and remarriage. It also condemns the swearing of oaths. The church believes it is possible to lose salvation, or fall from divine grace, if one goes back into sin.

The Church of God believes all the gifts of the Spirit are in operation in the church, and that the baptism of the Holy Spirit is evidenced by speaking in tongues. The church holds the following three ordinances: water baptism by immersion, the Lord's Supper reserved for sinless and consecrated Christians, and feet washing. Tithing is also practiced. This body is premillennial in eschatology.

An important belief which distinguishes it from many other Holiness Pentecostal churches is its assertion that it is the one true church. It believes the Christian Church was established before Pentecost around A.D. 28 and was plunged into apostasy when the First Council of Nicaea was held in A.D. 325. The true church was restored in North Carolina on June 13, 1903, and this is considered a fulfillment of the Isaiah 60:1-5 prophecy. The church experienced disruptions in 1923, 1993, and 2006, but it continues to be the church of God.

== Structure ==
The Church of God is governed as a theocracy. Christ is considered the head of the church and the Bible, the word of God, as interpreted by the General Assembly is considered the highest authority.

The General Assembly, consisting of all members of the TCOG in attendance, functions only as a judicial body, not an executive or legislature, whose duty is to correctly interpret the Bible and insure that God's will is done. While men and women can participate in the General Assembly, only men can have an actual role in decision making. The General Overseer is moderator of the General Assembly and speaks for the church when the General Assembly is not in session. According to the TCOG, "the office of General Overseer is filled by Divine appointment".
