= Christian stewardship =

Christian Theology

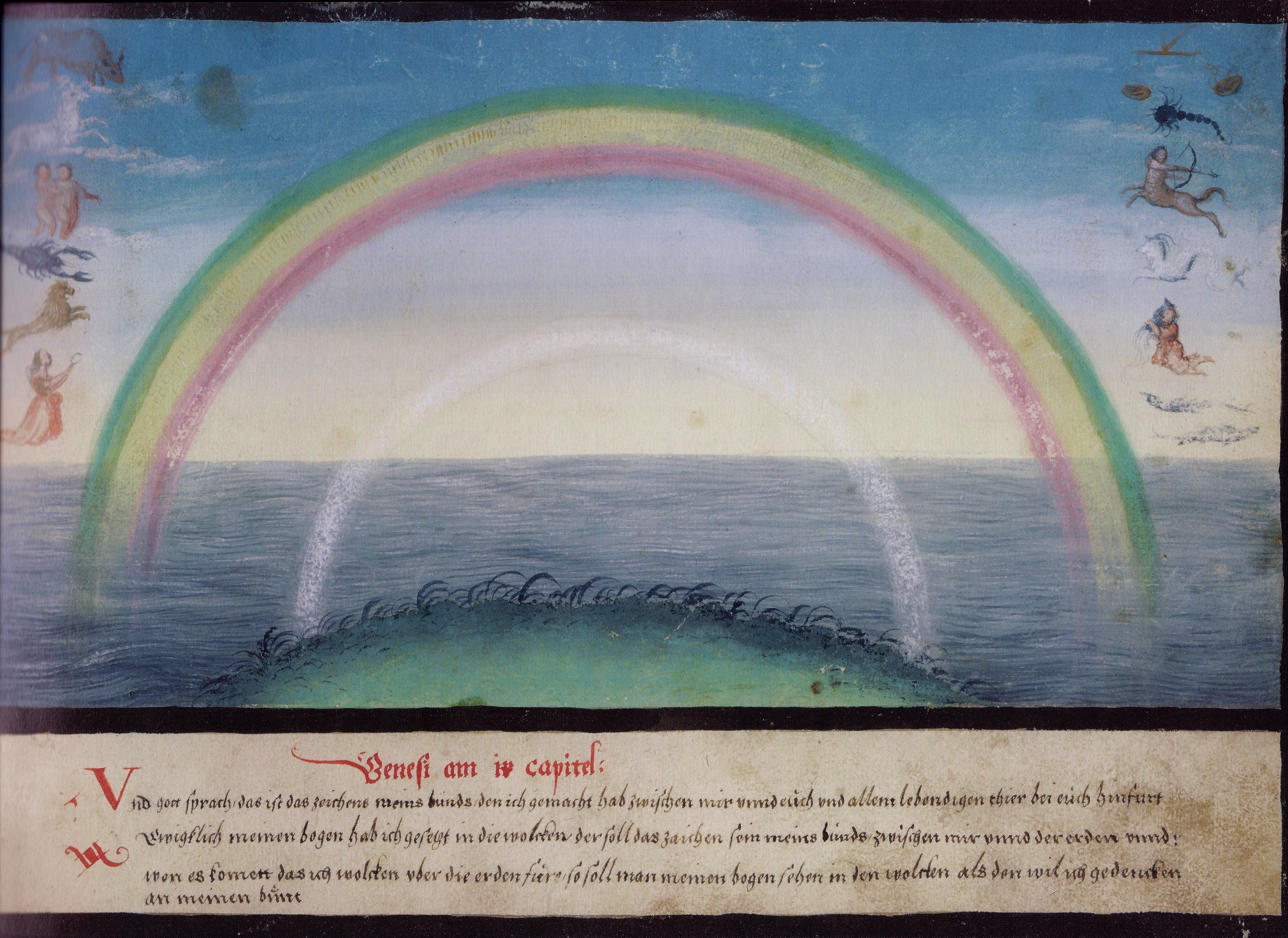
Noah's Covenant with God in the Old Testament in Genesis 9:1-3, as symbolized as a rainbow is seen as a foundational passage for Christian stewardship over the earth

Christian stewardship is a theological concept in Christianity that concerns the management of resources and gifts that God has entrusted them. Rooted in earlier concepts of Jewish stewardship in the Hebrew Bible, stewardship theology provides guidance for Christian adherents on how to raise funds for christian institutions and how to allocate resources. Stewardship is an all encompassing concept that is derived from the notion that the Earth was entrusted to humans by a higher power such as God. In many denominations of Western Christianity, stewardship is heavily rooted in the concept of anthropocentrism and the notion that humans are specially chosen by God to have dominion over the Earth. Views on stewardship are variable based on tradition and the faith background of the Christian group.

While stewardship is theoretically all-encompassing in scope, many denominations regularly use the concept in relation to the financial management of a religious institution, such as a church or an educational institution such as a seminary, although this is a very narrow facet of stewardship. In recent years, stewardship has been expanded to include concepts of environmental sustainability as a religious response to human-caused climate change and environmental degradation.

== Etymology ==
The notion of stewardship is derived from the ancient concept of appointing a steward to represent a monarch in the affairs of a kingdom. Steward is derived from Old English stíweard, stiȝweard, from stiȝ "hall, household" + weard "warden, keeper"; corresponding to Dutch: stadhouder, German Statthalter "place holder", a Germanic parallel to French lieutenant. Stewardship of a kingdom did not denote ownership, rather, it meant management in service of the monarch.

== Biblical references ==
The theological concept of stewardship is derived from the Bible from both the Old Testament and the New Testament. Notions of stewardship are influenced differently depending on which sources in the Bible are being cited.

=== Old Testament ===
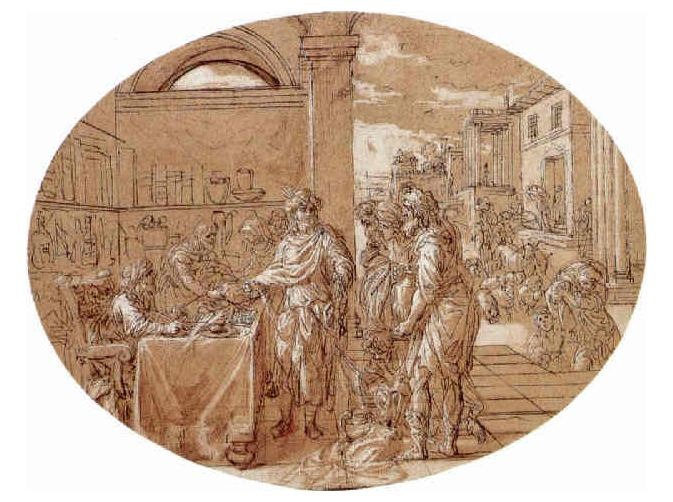
Tithing in the Temple by Pierre Monier

Concepts of stewardship were originally rooted in ideas of stewardship in early Judaism, particularly through the Torah. In Genesis 1:24-26, God gave humans dominion over the natural world. In Genesis 9:1-3 re-establishes human stewardship over the earth through Noah's covenant with God. Genesis 14:18-20 establishes the importance of financial stewardship and giving to religious institutions through the narrative of Abraham giving tithes to Melchizedek following the Battle of Siddim. Similarly, Deuteronomy 26 outlines the material obligations that Jews had to the temple.

Leviticus 19:9-10 implores adherents to not abandon the poor and provide for them. This passage established that caring for the poor is an essential facet of Christian stewardship.

Other books in the Hebrew Bible also touch on stewardship. For instance, Malachi 3:6–12 outlines the importance of tithing and states that not giving tithes to the temple is equivalent to "robbing" God. The passage emphasizes that stewardship of God's resources and giving to religious institutions must be maintained even during economic turbulence.

=== New Testament ===
Passages on stewardship in the New Testament often reflected messages in the old testament. Jesus had many things to say in the Gospels on particularly money and its ethics. Jesus strongly established in Matthew 6:21 and Matthew 6:24 that adherents must advocate for the poor and that one "cannot serve God and wealth". In a similar vain, Luke 4:18 and Luke 6:20 establish a strong mandate for mission to impoverished peoples. Walter Brueggemann noted in Luke 12:48 that humans are not slaves or indentured servants of God, but rather free agents whom much is given and much is expected of.

Other passages advocate for charity despite economic hardship. In Mark 12:43-44, Jesus upholds the donation to the temple by the poor widow as one of the highest acts of piety.

After the Gospels, the epistles of Paul the Apostle explore notions of stewardship in the early church. For instance in 2 Corinthians 9:7, Paul encourages Christians to engage in charity, not out of compulsion, but out of cheerful faith. In Romans 5:6-8, Paul reminds adherents of the new covenant that God made through the death and resurrection of Jesus. This passage is a reminder that gentiles are included as trustees over God's world.

== Traditional stewardship ==
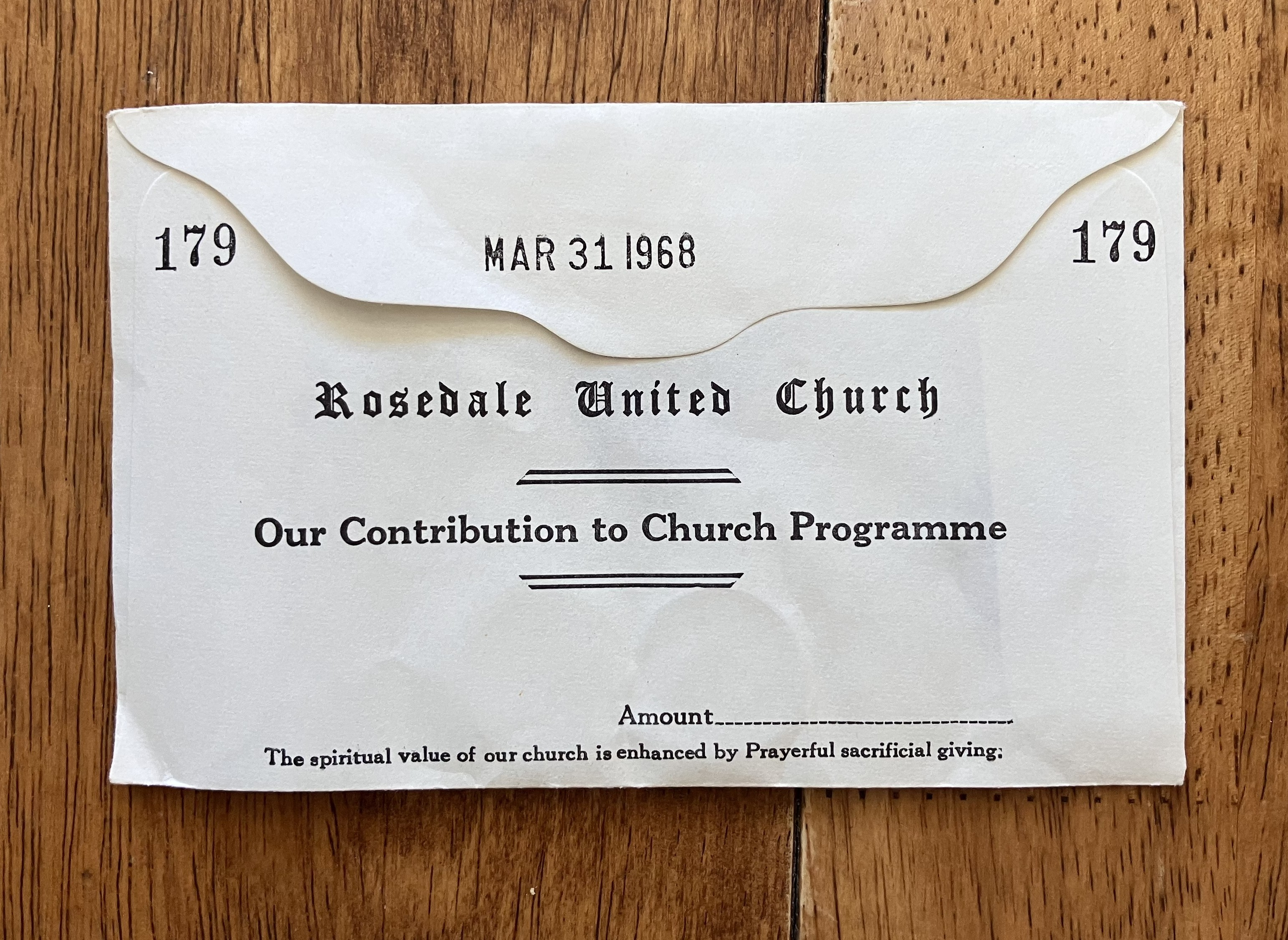
An offering envelope similar to those used in mainline churches. Weekly giving is a core component of Christian stewardship

Traditional notions of stewardship are often rooted in notions of secular power and financial concerns. Traditional stewardship theology was meant to guide congregations and churches on how to manage resource and interact with broader world. Taking tithes and offering are the most commonly thought forms of stewardship in the church. Beside fundraising, stewardship also encompasses management of talents and human resources within a church. In many congregations, Christians donate their skills and talents to the church's benefit. It is usually the responsibility of a priest or pastor or a stewardship committee to advocate for stewardship causes within a church.

It has been argued that traditional stewardship practices are in crisis in 21st century. Fewer people from Generation X, Millennials, and Generation Z donate to the church through tithes or through offering. This de-emphasis on financial stewardship has left many Mainline protestant denominations in financial crisis.

== Artistic stewardship ==
Some theological thinkers such as Augustine of Hippo and C. S. Lewis argued that stewardship should encompass artistic production. Specifically, stewardship of art implies that Christian morals can lay down objective standards for "good" or "bad" art. The concept is rooted in the Augustinian argument that artistic inspiration is a resource gifted from God and therefore falls under the umbrella of Christian stewardship.

== Environmental stewardship ==
Interfaith march in Rome for better environmental stewardship

In recent years, the environmental concerns have been addressed by the Christian stewardship. Theologians such as Francis Schaeffer have been influential in helping environmental stewardship have a place in Christian theology. Often quoted bible passages in favour of environmental stewardship are Genesis 2:15 which imparts the narrative of God giving the Garden of Eden to Adam and Psalm 24:1 which describes human stewardship over the natural world.

Walter Brueggemann argued that in Genesis 2 humans are less exceptional in the creation myth and that God created Adam (made from the adamah or soil) to act in partnership with his cohuman, Eve, and with the rest of the natural world. This line of thinking is aligned with a more biocentric moral outlook.

In 2008, The Green Bible was released by HarperCollins to emphasise the environmental teachings of the bible, including its emphasis on environmental stewardship.

== Denominational perspectives ==
=== Calvinism ===
John Calvin argued that humans are the "administers" of Earth in God's stead. Calvin argued in Commentaires de Jean Calvin sur l’ Ancien Testament that human must strive for the restoration of harmony with God that was lost with the original sin and resulted in humanity's total depravity. Calvin further argued that progress through works is the only way humans can atone for the original sin. Bauer argued that Calvin was arguing Calvinist stewardship did not just mean creating economic value as Max Weber argued in The Protestant Ethic and the Spirit of Capitalism, but rather creating social harmony through working to meet all needs within society. This goal being to restore the world that God would desire.

=== Fundamentalist and Evangelical Christians ===
Some fundamentalist christian groups actively adhere to dominion theology, the notion that Christian stewardship extends to secular civic government. Theologians such as Jerry Falwell who have adhered to dispensationalism, argued that it was necessary for Christians to influence or even take "the moral spiritual, and ecclesiastical control over society". The reasoning comes from the Genesis 1:26–28 passage in which Christian nationalists argue that God gave believers dominion over more than just the natural world, but also over the secular affairs of humans.

From the 1960s to the 1990s, many fundamentalist and evangelical Christians supported environmental stewardship. Evangelical theologians such as Francis Schaeffer advocated for environmental protection and sustainability in the Bible Presbyterian Church and the wider evangelical movement. However, theologians prominent among the Christian right such as Jerry Falwell sought to challenge environmentalism in the early 1990s as conservatives in American politics had greater influence on the Christian right. By 1993, environmental stewardship theology disappeared among fundamentalist and evangelical Christian groups.

=== Liberal and Progressive Protestants ===
Many liberal and progressive denominations do not include mandatory tithes as apart of their stewardship theology. Many take a humanistic perspective to stewardship over the earth as opposed to requiring Christian dominion over the Earth.

Liberal and progressive churches usually place a strong emphasis on environmental stewardship.

=== Roman Catholicism ===
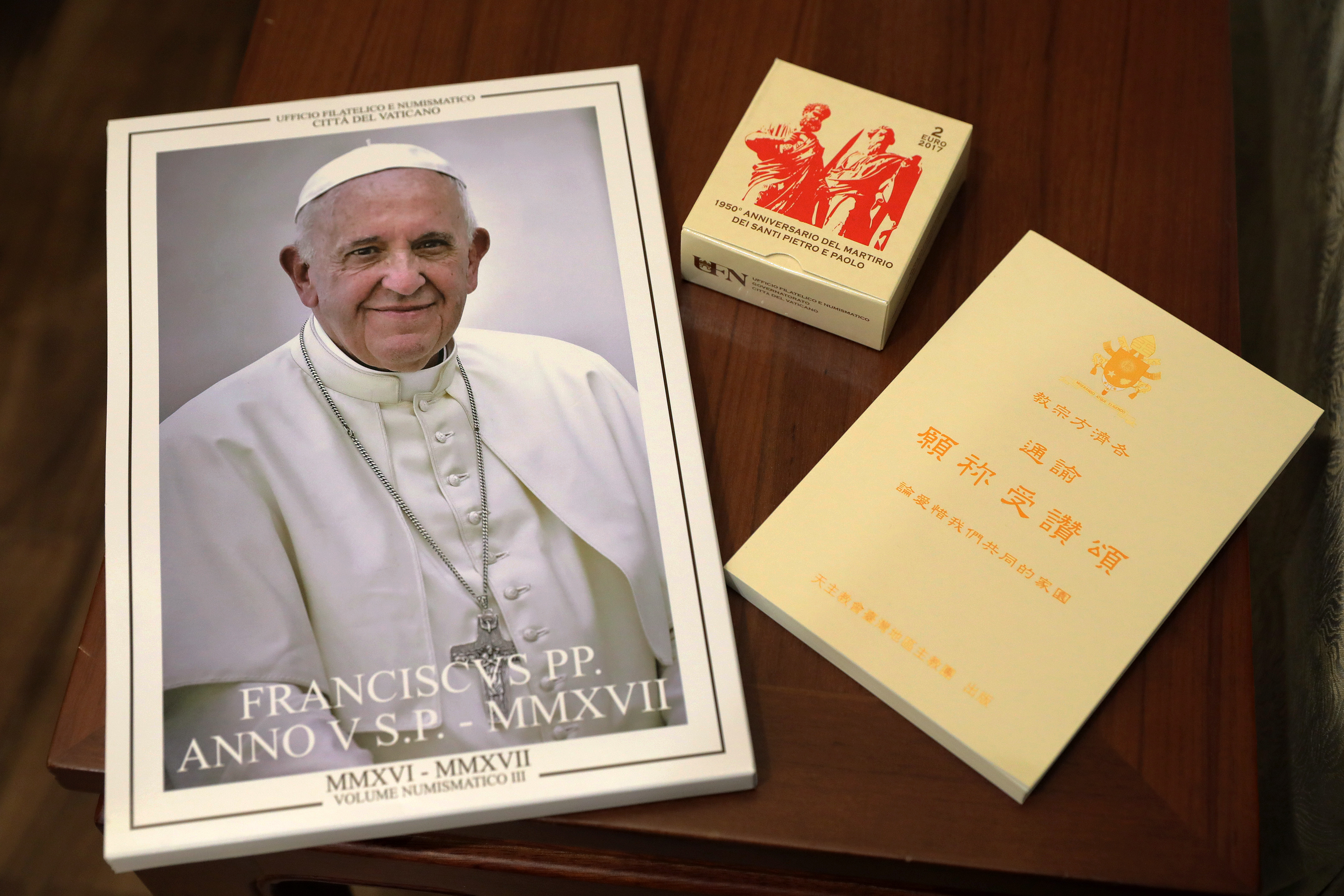
Traditional Chinese version of Pope Francis' Laudato si'

Stewardship has a central place in the theology of the Catholic Church. Augustine of Hippo in the The City of God argued the Church is the successor of Roman Empire and supreme authority over the known world and that the bishops, equally with the bishop of Rome, ought to rule it. Later in the Middle Ages, the popes Pope Gregory VII and Pope Innocent III sought to argue that the papacy as the supreme authority of the universal church and has supreme authority over secular power. From this perspective, Christian stewardship in the Catholic Church placed emphasis on the Pope in being the chief steward of God's creation. In the modern age, the Catholic Church tends to engage in more ecumenism viewing non-catholics as "separated brethren".

Additionally, Christian stewardship is expressed in the Catholic Church through tithing. Since antiquity, it has been expected that Christians donate one tenth of their income or estate to their local church. Later, Charlemagne made it law that Christians must tithe to their baptismal church. The Gregorian Reforms undid Charlemagne's laws on tithing and Christians were again free to tithe to the church of their preference. Therefore, the power of the Catholic Church to claim direction in stewardship has been variable. Nonetheless, the notion of financial stewardship was adopted from Early Judaism and maintained into the modernity by the Catholic Church.

In recent years, the Catholic Church has also adopted environmental stewardship theology. In 2015, Pope Francis promulgated Laudato si' which compiled catholic thought on environmental matters and addressed modern concerns of biodiversity loss, pollution, and climate change. This encyclical has inspired the global Laudato Si' Movement which seeks to mobilize the catholic community achieve ecological and climate justice.

== Politics ==
In politics, principles of Christian stewardship plays a significant role in European Christian democratic political movements. Stewardship of resources and of the environment was played a significant role in formation of principles in Ordoliberal movements such as the Christian Democratic Union of Germany.

=== Netherlands ===
Stewardship and Dutch variants of dominion theology hold a strong place in the politics of the Netherlands. The Dutch political party "CDA" (Christian Democratic Appeal) lists stewardship as one of its four key ideals. This refers not only to taking care of the environment but also a principled stand towards human as well as natural resources. The Reformed Political Party and Christian Union similarity incorporate variants of stewardship principles within their official principles.

== Criticism ==
Concepts of stewardship in Christianity are criticized for its heavy anthropocentrism in relation with the natural world. Some ethicists and religious groups reject humans as being the stewards of the earth as being an exceptionalist point of view. The position that Christian ideas of stewardship has contributed to environmental was argued by Lynn Townsend White Jr. in his article "The Historical Roots of Our Ecologic Crisis" (Science, 1967). White argued that those who align themselves with Christian dominion beliefs are more likely to be indifferent towards the natural world.

In contrast to Christian stewardship, some Hindu groups interpret the Vedic texts as promoting a biocentric moral outlook in which humans are a co-equal facet of system of nature.

Christian stewardship is also criticized for its occasional associations with dominion theology and the idea that Christians should advocate for the ending of the separation of church and state in order to establish a theocratic government.
