= Church of God (Huntsville, Alabama) =

Pentecostal holiness movement body of Christians

The Church of God (Huntsville, Alabama) is a Holiness Pentecostal body of Christians, formerly based in Huntsville, Alabama.

The Church of God (Huntsville, Alabama) shares a common history with the Church of God of Prophecy (COGOP) up until their division in 1943. The original Church of God was led by Ambrose Jessup Tomlinson (1865-1943) until his death. The leaders of the church determined to install Milton A. Tomlinson as the General Overseer of the church. Milton's brother, Homer Aubrey Tomlinson, withdrew and established church headquarters in Queens Village, Queens. After the death of Homer Tomlinson, Voy M. Bullen was chosen as his successor and headquarters were moved to Huntsville, Alabama, closer to the center of the movement. Bishop Bullen chose Danny R. Patrick as his successor, prior to his death in 1997. Bishop Patrick moved headquarters yet again, to his hometown of Scottville, Kentucky. He is the pastor of the largest church in the organization, East Willow Street Church of God. This group calls itself The Church of God, though "World Headquarters" is sometimes added for clarification. In 2016 Bishop Danny R. Patrick chose Roger L. Centers, as the new General Overseer.

The Handbook of Denominations reported 75,890 members for this group in 1978. Piepkorn's Profiles in Belief reported 1933 congregations in the United States with 75,290 members. By most accounts this figure is highly inflated.

A recent division brought into existence The Church of God in Divine Order, which was organized October 14, 2000, led by Ted Carr who disagreed with the decision to appoint Patrick as General Overseer. The group is headquartered in Sand Springs, Oklahoma.
