= European Theological Seminary =

European Theological Seminary e.V.
- Type: Private theological seminary
- Established: 1958 (as German Church of God Bible School, Krehwinkel)
- Religious affiliation: Church of God
- President: Manuel and Bethany Martin-Arroyo
- Location: Kniebis, Freudenstadt, Baden-Württemberg, Germany
- Website: www.ets-kniebis.de

The European Theological Seminary e.V. (ETS) is a private, Christian faith-based seminary located in Kniebis (Freudenstadt), Germany, accredited by the European Council for Theological Education (formerly European Evangelical Accrediting Association). It is part of the educational ministry of the Church of God.

The seminary's campus in Kniebis (Freudenstadt)

== History ==
The European Theological Seminary was founded in 1949 through the initiation of Church of God World Missions. The seminary has undergone several name changes in its history. It began in 1958 as the German Church of God Bible School in Krehwinkel. The name was changed to the International Bible Seminary (I.B.S.) in 1964, and then became the European Bible Seminary in 1972. In autumn of 2002, the European Bible Seminary relocated to Freudenstadt-Kniebis and changed its name to European Theological Seminary (ETS).

== Accreditation ==
The seminary's accreditation status is recorded in the European Quality Assurance Register for Higher Education's (EQAR) DEQAR database. Per DEQAR, ETS (institution ID DEQARINST7494) received a positive accreditation decision on 16 September 2025, valid until 15 September 2030, covering institutional and programme accreditation. ECTE's own provider listing specifies this covers a residential Advanced Certificate for Christian Ministries (EQF Level 6, 180 ECTS, 3 years), delivered in English. In 2025, ECTE separately granted ETS a programme accreditation as a Micro-Credential Provider (formal decision: approved, valid until 2030; EQF Level 6, ECTS range 1–10, discipline theology), which qualifies the seminary to offer accredited micro-credential courses (see Online programmes, below).

== Online programmes ==
Micro-credentials have become established in Europe in recent years as a short, flexible pathway into education: the Council of the European Union adopted a 2022 recommendation on a European approach to micro-credentials for lifelong learning and employability, and UNESCO describes them in a policy paper as individualised, flexible learning pathways for certifying short-term learning experiences.

Separately from its residential programmes, the seminary offers short, single-subject online courses as micro-credentials under the brand ETS Online. ETS itself holds since Fall 2025 the Micro-Credential Provider programme accreditation from ECTE that qualifies it to offer these courses (see Accreditation, above); they are distinct from the residential Advanced Certificate for Christian Ministries described above.

== Leadership ==
As of 2026, the seminary's presidents are Manuel and Bethany Martin-Arroyo; Manuel Martin-Arroyo holds a D.D. (Doctor of Divinity) from the Asian Seminary of Christian Ministry (Philippines). The position of academic dean is held by Tamara Milanovic, PhD. Past presidents (referred to institutionally as "Schulleiter") have included Robert Seyda (1949–1951), Lamar and Ardys McDaniel (1958–1962), William and Lydia Henry (1968–1970), Heinrich and Lisa Scherz (1973–1989), Edward and Irma Williams (1989–1992), Philip and Mary Morris (1992–1996), John and Pat Sims (1996–2004), Paul and Gabi Schmidgall (2004–2018), and Stephen and Janice Darnell (2018–2022).

Paul Schmidgall, president from 2004 to 2018, is a Pentecostal-movement church historian. He holds a doctorate in contemporary Judaism from the Hebrew University of Jerusalem (1997) and has authored several biographical entries in the Biographisch-Bibliographisches Kirchenlexikon (BBKL) on early Pentecostal figures, including Thomas Ball Barratt, Alexander Boddy, Donald Gee, and Lewi Pethrus, as well as a widely cited history of German Pentecostalism, Hundert Jahre Deutsche Pfingstbewegung 1907–2007 (Nordhausen, 2007/2008).
