= Homer Aubrey Tomlinson =

American bishop in the Church of God of Prophecy

- King of UBC; King of All Nations of Men
- Church: God of Prophecy
- Diocese: Queens Village, New York

Personal details
- Born: October 25, 1892 Westfield, Indiana
- Died: December 5, 1968 (aged 76) Manhattan Veterans Hospital, New York City, New York
- Denomination: Pentecostal (Holiness movement)
- Parents: Ambrose Jessup Tomlinson (father)
- Political party: Theocratic Party

King of the World
- Reign: 1962 – December 5, 1968
- Coronation: October 7, 1966; Jerusalem (planned)

Homer Aubrey Tomlinson (October 25, 1892 – December 5, 1968), was an American bishop in the Church of God of Prophecy, a Pentecostal Holiness Christian denomination founded by his father, Ambrose Jessup Tomlinson in 1922.

== Biography ==
Tomlinson was born on October 25, 1892, in Westfield, Indiana, to Ambrose Jessup Tomlinson. His younger brother, Milton Ambrose Tomlinson, was decided by its presbytery to be God's chosen successor for General Overseer in 1944. The two brothers did not get along, so Homer founded his own splinter "Church of God" denomination around the same time and became its bishop.

He founded the Theocratic Party and was its candidate for U.S. President for elections from 1952 to 1968.

In 1962, at the University of British Columbia, he declared himself "King of UBC" and "King of the World". On October 7, 1966, Bishop Tomlinson planned to crown himself King of the World or "King of All Nations of Men" in Jerusalem.

His Church of God group was headquartered in Queens Village, New York, until his death in 1968. He died on December 5, 1968, at the Manhattan Veterans Hospital.

== Legacy ==
His church moved to Huntsville, Alabama after his death.
