= The Church of God (Charleston, Tennessee) =

The Church of God (Charleston, Tennessee) or TCOG is a Holiness Pentecostal denomination of Christianity. It is based in the United States. The church's actual name is The Church of God; however, the parenthetical phrase Charleston, Tennessee is added to distinguish it from similar-sounding organizations. The Church of God was organized in 1993 after a schism in the Church of God of Prophecy. Its headquarters is in Cleveland, Tennessee but its postal address is in Charleston, Tennessee. As of 2007, The Church of God operates in 48 countries and territories.

== History ==
=== Origins ===
In August 1886, Richard Spurling (1810–1891), an ordained Baptist minister, became dissatisfied with what he believed were overly creedal approaches to New Testament Christianity. Spurling collaborated with seven members from Missionary Baptist churches in Monroe County, Tennessee and Cherokee County, North Carolina. In 1903, these small fellowships organized the Christian Union with the stated intent to unite on the principles of the New Testament without reference to restatements of the faith in creedal form.

Ultimately, the Christian Union under leadership of Spurling's son Richard Spurling Jr, and others including a former Quaker and Bible salesman named Ambrose Jessup Tomlinson, experienced remarkable growth in the late 19th and early 20th centuries in the Appalachian foothills. By 1907, Tomlinson had become the acknowledged leader of these Christian believers whose faith was driven by Wesleyan beliefs of personal holiness and reported Pentecostal experiences of being filled with the Holy Spirit and glossolalia. Many small congregations were planted and organized under the common name adopted in 1907, Church of God. In 1909, Tomlinson was elected General Overseer of the fledgling church. He held that position until 1923.

Contrary to its desire to be free from creedal restatements of faith, this body was soon disrupted by competing restatements of biblical teachings from within its own ranks. An ensuing division in 1923 resulted in two primary splinter groups, called respectively Church of God (Cleveland, Tennessee) and the Church of God over which A.J. Tomlinson is General Overseer. The latter, led by Tomlinson, was court-ordered in 1951 to assume the name Church of God of Prophecy which is still in use. A. J. Tomlinson's son, Milton Ambrose Tomlinson, succeeded him as General Overseer in 1943, and served until age-related disability prompted his retirement in 1990.

=== Reorganization ===
Upon the election of M. A. Tomlinson's successor that year, yet another schism occurred. One group within the Church of God of Prophecy, declared that the selection process was a departure from what had historically been perceived as "theocratic government" within the body's governing structure and procedure.

In 1993, this group which at the time referred to themselves as "The Concerned" called for a "solemn assembly", borrowing an Old Testament term for corporate devotion to prayer to rhetorically emphasize its earnestness. The "solemn assembly" resulted in the formation of The Church of God. The church places particular emphasis upon the word The in its title as a statement of this reorganization, believing it is the singular exclusive embodiment of the New Testament Christian church. Robert J. Pruitt was chosen to be the new overseer, and he remained so until 2006, when age-related disability prompted his retirement.

A meeting of TCOG's leadership during the summer of 2006 ended with the selection of Stephen Smith as the interim General Overseer to replace Pruitt. During the TCOG General Assembly of 2006, Smith was confirmed as the General Overseer. A faction within the church disagreed with how Smith was selected, and his rank of Bishop. As a result, this group withdrew and formed The Church of God under the leadership of Bishop James C. Nabors.

In June 2015, Smith died, leaving the office of General Overseer vacant. A meeting of the presbytery unanimously chose Bishop Oscar Pimentel to serve as the Interim General Overseer until a more permanent selection could be made at the annual General Assembly. In August, during the annual General Assembly, Pimentel was accepted unanimously by the membership present to serve in the office of General Overseer.

== Beliefs ==
The Church of God is a Pentecostal church in the Wesleyan Holiness tradition. It believes that one is saved or born again as a result of repentance, justification and regeneration. After one is saved, a second work of grace (sanctification) makes living a holy life possible along with the doctrine of Christian perfectionism. The church is opposed to the use of tobacco, alcohol and drugs; opposed to membership in secret societies; opposed to wearing jewelry and other ornamentation; and against divorce and remarriage. It also condemns the swearing of oaths. The church believes it is possible to lose salvation, or fall from divine grace, if one goes back into sin.

The Church of God believes all the gifts of the Spirit are in operation in the church and that speaking in tongues is the initial evidence of the baptism of the Holy Spirit. TCOG holds the following three ordinances: water baptism by immersion, the Lord's Supper reserved for sinless and consecrated Christians, and feet washing. Tithing is also practiced. This body is premillennial in eschatology.

It believes the observance of Sabbath was a requirement of Jewish law and as such was not carried over into the Grace Dispensation. Sunday is not Christian Sabbath but is merely a day set aside to give special attention to the worship of God. Instead of keeping only Sabbath holy, we are required in this dispensation to keep every day holy. Jewish Shabbat is a type of Christ, who is our rest, rather than the day.

An important belief which distinguishes it from many other Holiness-Pentecostal churches is its belief that it is the true church. It believes the Christian Church was established before Pentecost around A.D. 28 (citing Matthew 16:18) and was plunged into apostasy in A.D. 325, with the rejection of theocracy in the Council of Nicea. TCOG holds that the true church was restored in North Carolina on June 13, 1903, and that this restoration is a fulfilment of the Isaiah 60:1-5 prophecy. The Church of God experienced disruptions in 1923 and 1993 but, according to the TCOG, it is the true church of God.
