= Church of God School of Ministry =

Educational institution in Tennessee, US

The Church of God School of Ministry is a postsecondary educational institution in Cleveland, Tennessee, United States. Historically, the school was affiliated with the Church of God, a Christian denomination.

== History ==
The Church of God School of Ministry was first imagined by Dr. Paul L. Walker. It was his vision for every Church of God minister to have the opportunity for ministerial training and education whether or not he/she could leave the pastorate and travel to Cleveland or whether or not he/she could afford the studies. This vision became reality in 1998 when the Church of God Executive Committee and the Council of Eighteen created the School of Ministry as the vehicle to provide this ministerial training, regardless of educational background or ability to pay. Dr. Donald S. Aultman, an experienced educator, was selected to guide the creation and development of the School of Ministry.

The school began its work in September 1998. After acquiring a staff and finding a place to work, the school began concentrating its efforts on developing the curriculum, which is now a certificate program on the college level—Certificate In Ministerial Studies (CIMS).

== Theology and academics ==
As of 2026 the school is authorized for operation as a postsecondary educational institution by the Tennessee Higher Education Commission.
