= Shearer Schoolhouse Revival =

The Shearer Schoolhouse Revival was a series of Christian evangelical meetings conducted in mid-1896 in Cherokee County, North Carolina, United States.

It was characterized by what participants believed to be the biblical experience of speaking in tongues. It is believed that this was the first mass outpouring of the Holy Ghost (i.e., with tongues) since the time of the Early Church.

Many of the participants of these worship gatherings eventually organized into what is now known as the Church of God (Cleveland).

== History ==
In the 1880s, Baptist preacher Richard Spurling was part of the Latter Rain Holiness movement in North Carolina and Tennessee.

In 1886, 72-year-old Spurling and his 27-year-old son, Richard G. Spurling Jr, (both licensed Baptist preachers), held a meeting on Thursday, August 19, 1886, to see if there was interest in starting a new church. The meeting was held at the Spurling family’s grist mill on the banks of Barney Creek, Tennessee. Eight people came forward and a new Christian Union church was established.

Spurling Jr held a Revival meeting in his Baptist church in Liberty, Tennessee, during 1892 during which some members spoke in tongues.

In summer 1896 the CU organised a ten-day revival led by four lay evangelists (William Martin, Billy Hamby, Joe Tipton and Milton McNabb). This was held in the Shearer Schoolhouse in Camp Creek, North Carolina.

The revival brought a “spirit of revival” which continued after the ten days, with meetings held in people’s homes. People came from surrounding areas to see what was happening and “more than 100 persons received the baptism with the Holy Ghost and spoke in tongues.” At this point the Spurlings were joined by Methodist preacher W. F. Bryant.

== Controversy ==
In 1899, the local churches excommunicated 40 people for their involvement with the CU; they cited differences in doctrine and the style of worship. Both Spurling Jr and Bryant were also excommunicated. Other actions against the CU included burning down their meeting house, contamination of water sources and beatings.

== 20th century ==
On May 15, 1902 the CU changed its name to the “Holiness Church at Camp Creek”. New preachers were added, including the Quaker Ambrose Jessup Tomlinson.

In 1907, Tomlinson changed the name from "Holiness Church" to "The Church of God".

== Legacy ==
This event predated by nearly a decade the 1906 Azusa Street Revival, which is generally held to be the event that started the Pentecostal Movement in the United States. This suggests the Azusa Street Revival was one of several similar religious phenomena happening around the same time, of which Azusa Street became the most widely known and influential.
