= Church of God of Prophecy =

Pentecostal denomination founded 1923

- Flag of the Church of God of Prophecy
- Classification: Protestant
- Orientation: Holiness Pentecostal
- Presiding Bishop: Tim Coalter
- Associations: Pentecostal World Fellowship and Pentecostal/Charismatic Churches of North America
- Region: Worldwide
- Founder: A. J. Tomlinson
- Origin: 1886
- Branched from: Church of God (Cleveland, Tennessee)
- Separations: Church of God (Huntsville, Alabama) (1944) The Church of God (Jerusalem Acres) (1957) The Church of God (Charleston, Tennessee) (1993)
- Congregations: Over 11,000
- Members: 800,000
- Official website: cogop.org

The Church of God of Prophecy (COGOP) is a Holiness Pentecostal Christian Church. It is one of six Church of God bodies headquartered in Cleveland, Tennessee that arose from a small meeting of believers who gathered at the Holiness Church at Camp Creek near the Tennessee/North Carolina border on Saturday, June 13, 1903. The Church of God of Prophecy has congregations and missions in over 135 countries, with a membership of around 800,000. Membership in North America as of 2024 was 88,216 in 1,633 churches. Ministries of the Church include homes for children, bible training institutes, youth camps, ministerial aid, and Spirit and Life Seminary. The Church operates Fields of the Wood, a Bible theme park and popular tourist attraction, near Murphy, North Carolina.

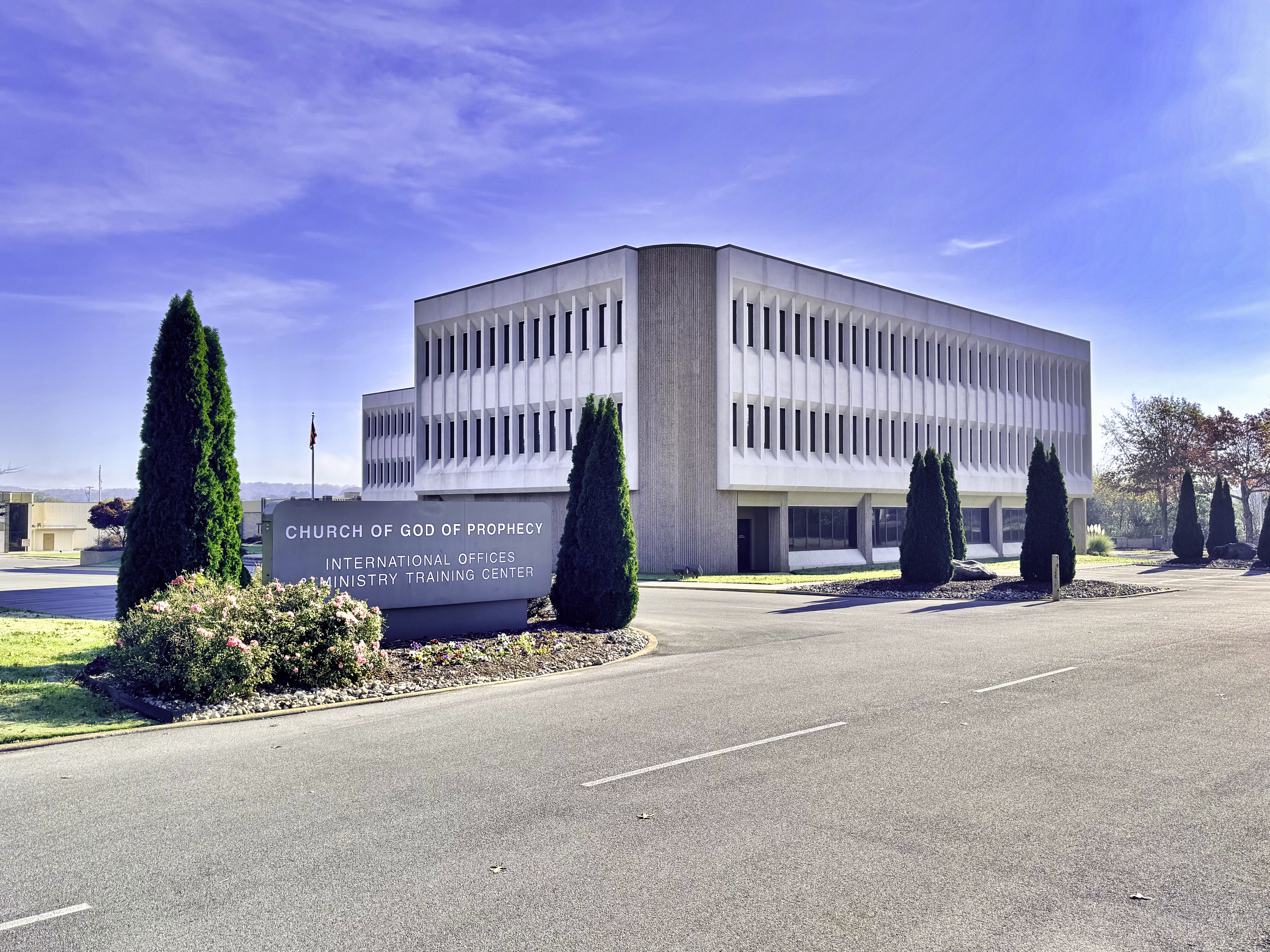
Church of God of Prophecy international offices

== History ==
The Church has, in the past, internally referred to itself as "Church of God" in its worship services. Many past official records utilized that name with the parenthetical qualifier of "(Cleveland, Tennessee)". However, the more generic moniker fell out of common official use many decades ago. There was controversy over which side of the division had the legal right to the name and who was really the true "Church of God". This (COGOP) body was definitely a part of the original "Church of God", over which originally A. J. Tomlinson was the general overseer. In 1923, these two Churches became divided over church idealism (specifically, the matter of church polity) which could not be compromised on or resolved by either side, (the one Church of God would be governed by twelve men in the upper room "called elders" and the other Church would be governed and overseen by one man A.J. Tomlinson). In 1952, after lengthy litigation over the use of the simple name "Church of God", a court in Bradley County, Tennessee ordered that the Tomlinson faction add "of Prophecy" to their name, because this "Church of God" then viewed itself as the New Testament Church of the last days, or so the court reasoned. Thereafter, the Church uses the appellation "Church of God of Prophecy". Both groups claim the same history up to the year 1923.

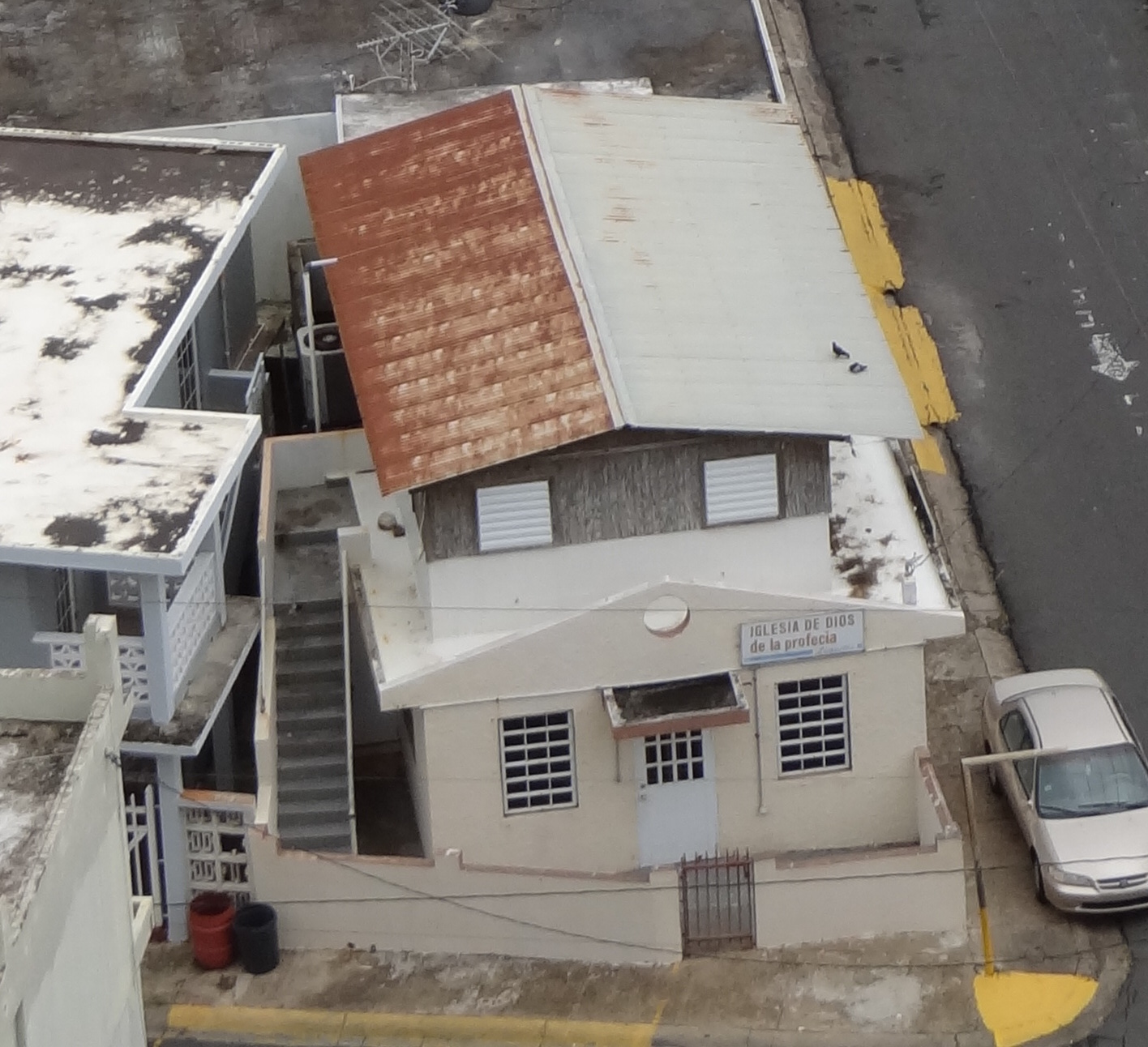
Iglesia de Dios de la Profecía, (Its Spanish name) in Luquillo, Puerto Rico

=== Early history ===
In August 1886, Elder Richard Spurling (1810-1891), an ordained Baptist minister associated with the Latter Rain movement, rejected the dominant Landmark Baptist views of the Church, which he believed were too credal and exclusive. With seven members from Holly Springs and Pleasant Hill Missionary Baptist churches in Monroe County, Tennessee, and Cherokee County, North Carolina, he organized the Christian Union. These Christians hoped to free themselves from man-made creeds and unite on the principles of the New Testament. In September 1886, Spurling's son, Richard G. Spurling Jr (1857-1935), was ordained as pastor of the Christian Union congregation. He also formed two other congregations. The father and son shared a vision to restore the Church.

Around 1895, a revival under the preaching of B. H. Irwin swept into the area. Richard G. Spurling accepted Irwin's teachings on holiness, but was wary of the extreme direction in which he felt the movement was headed. The Shearer Schoolhouse Revival of 1896 helped to move Spurling's group away from the general faith and practice of Baptists and toward that of the Holiness Movement. In 1902, R. G. Spurling influenced a Holiness group led by W. F. Bryant to form the Holiness Church at Camp Creek, North Carolina. Spurling was elected pastor and Bryant was ordained as a deacon. The next year brought into the Church an energetic and powerful leader, Ambrose Jessup Tomlinson, or A. J. Tomlinson. Tomlinson, a former Quaker, who experienced an inner change of regeneration and sanctification, came in 1899 to the Appalachian region as a missionary. He became acquainted with Spurling and Bryant and caught Spurling's vision of the restoration of the Church. He united with the Church at Camp Creek on June 13, 1903, and soon became the acknowledged leader.

New churches were organized in North Carolina, Tennessee, and Georgia. The first annual meeting of all the churches was held in 1906 in Cherokee County, North Carolina, and the name "Church of God" was adopted in 1907. Tomlinson professed a baptism of the Holy Ghost experience in 1908, which firmly established the Church as part of the Pentecostal Movement. This took place under the preaching of Gaston B. Cashwell, a minister who was very influential in bringing Pentecostalism to North Carolina, the Appalachians and the east coast. Tomlinson was elected general overseer of the Church of God in 1909.

The present day Church of God of Prophecy officially accepts the Bible as God's holy word, inspired, inerrant, and infallible and as the highest authority in matters of faith and practice. This expression, rightly divided, is evidence that the early 20th century organizers of the Church of God of Prophecy were heavily influenced by the works of C. I. Scofield, in particular his writings on dispensationalism.

In 1923, the Church of God was disrupted by matters concerning finance and governance, leading to a division. The largest body resulting from the division exists as the Church of God (Cleveland, Tennessee). What is now known as the Church of God of Prophecy was the smaller body and remained under the leadership of Tomlinson. Tomlinson continued as general overseer over this Church until his death in 1943.

The presbytery believed that God directed them to bring the younger son, Milton Ambrose Tomlinson (1906–1995), forward to leadership. The General Assembly confirmed this in 1944, and he became the general overseer of the Church. The additional phrase of Prophecy was added to the name on May 2, 1952. Under Milton Tomlinson's leadership, the Church began the White Wing Publishing House, White Wing Christian Bookstores, The Voice of Salvation radio and TV programs, and numerous other ministries. In 1961, the publishers at the White Wing Publishing House and Press considered M. A. Tomlinson to be "God's spokesman", a belief which was shared among the Church at large. M. A. Tomlinson served as general overseer until 1990. Past educational institutions include the Church of God of Prophecy Bible Training Institute, and also Tomlinson College, both of which are now defunct. Both institutions were located in Cleveland, Tennessee.

=== Schisms ===
In 1943–44, Homer Aubrey Tomlinson, older brother of Milton, left to form a denomination headquartered in Queens Village, Queens. This denomination would become the Church of God (Huntsville, Alabama), when it relocated its headquarters after Homer's death in 1968. Homer founded the Theocratic Party and was its candidate for U.S. president in 1952 and 1964. He was a Bishop who planned to crown himself King of the World or "King of All Nations of Men" in Jerusalem on October 7, 1966.

In 1957, Grady R. Kent went out of the Church of God of Prophecy and formed the Church of God (Jerusalem Acres), which adopted its name in 1958.

When the Church elected a new general overseer in 1990 after the retirement of Milton Tomlinson, the stage was set for another division. A small body left in 1993 after a division in the Church led to another Church being formed by a group that felt that its congregation was led by God to appoint Robert J. Pruitt as their general overseer. That group is commonly known as The Church of God (Charleston, Tennessee).

=== Recent history ===
"Exclusivity" has never been an official Church teaching. However, some ministers have subscribed to such teachings, and still hold them today, separate from the Church's official stance on the subject. The Church is working hard to correct the negative impression that this assumption has caused. In 2004, a joint cooperative world evangelism effort began between the Church of God (Cleveland, Tennessee) and the Church of God of Prophecy. This, and other efforts, are steps toward healing the effects of the long-time hurt and mistrust between the two organizations.

In 2006, at the Church's bi-annual General Assembly, General Overseer Fred Fisher retired from this leadership role and a new general overseer was appointed, Randy Howard. After a week-long discussion between members at this same General Assembly, the Church changed its long-standing interpretation of acceptable reasons for divorce and remarriage. The Church agreed that people who had been divorced (for the cause of fornication) and were later remarried may become members of the Church of God of Prophecy. There was an overwhelming majority, made up of several thousand voting members, that voted for the change.

Bishop Howard announced his resignation on April 26, 2013, for a season of spiritual renewal and to focus on personal issues within his family. With Howard's resignation, the general presbyters of the Church were Bishops David Browder (Asia and Oceania), Sam Clements (North America), Clayton Endecott (Europe, the Commonwealth of Independent States and the Middle East), Benjamin Feliz (Central America, Mexico and Spanish-speaking Caribbean), Clayton Martin (Caribbean and Atlantic Ocean Isles), Stephen Masilela (Africa) and Gabriel Vidal (South America) served as a plurality of leadership until before the International Assembly convened in Orlando, Florida in late July 2014.

During the pre-Assembly meeting of International Presbytery, after days of prayer and discussion, it was discerned that Bishop Sam N. Clements, North America General Presbyter, was God's choice as the sixth general overseer of the Church of God of Prophecy. Bishop Clements began his term on September 1, 2014. The current Presiding Bishop is Tim Coalter, who was selected at the 2022 International Assembly.

== Beliefs ==
From early on, the Church of God of Prophecy has claimed belief in principles based in the Bible, and continually researches scriptures through various committees. At the Eleventh Annual Assembly in 1915, the general overseer stated in his annual address, "We do not claim to have reached perfection; we are only searching for it." The following doctrinal insights reflect current findings through the Church of God of Prophecy International Assembly. The leadership acknowledges through various studies and writings that there are human limits of spiritual comprehension. Therefore, the organization continually studies for greater knowledge of God's design for the church and attempts to better align itself to the New Testament teachings of Christianity in order to continually grow and develop into the "fullness of the stature of Christ".

Henceforth, following each Assembly, the Biblical Doctrine and Polity Committee would be expected to make any further adjustments that would be required in light of this mandate to reflect Assembly decisions.

From its beginnings, the Church of God of Prophecy has asserted that its beliefs are based on "the whole Bible rightly divided". Water baptism by immersion, the Lord's Supper, and feet washing are held to be ordinances of the Church. Individuals must profess to be born again in order to become members, as well as maintain a consistent Christian witness. This group does not maintain that an individual must be a member of the Church to be a Christian.

The Church of God of Prophecy is firm in its commitment to orthodox Christian belief. It affirms that there is one God eternally existing in three persons: Father, Son, and Holy Spirit. It believes in the deity of Christ, his virgin birth, sinless life, the physical miracles he performed, his atoning death upon the cross, his bodily resurrection, his ascension to the right hand of the Father, and his personal return in power and glory at his second coming. It professes that regeneration by the Holy Spirit is essential for the salvation of sinful mankind.

It teaches the belief that the sinner is brought to an awareness of the need for salvation through the convicting work of the Holy Spirit. It teaches the belief that in sanctification by the blood of Christ, one is made holy. It affirms the present, active ministry of the Holy Spirit who guides the Church and by whose indwelling and empowerment that individuals are able to live godly lives and render effective service to God and others. It teaches the oneness and ultimate unity of believers for which our Lord prayed, and that this should be visibly displayed "that the world may know, see, and believe" God's glory, the coming of His Son, and the great love He has for His people (John 17:20-23). The organization is committed to the sanctity of the marriage bond and the importance of strong, loving Christian families.

The Church teaches (and many members believe) that it embraces all biblical doctrines as taught in the New Testament. The particular interpretations of the teachings (primarily from the New Testament) were originally introduced in a series of 29 sermons delivered on the Voice of Salvation radio program by M. A. Tomlinson. Several doctrinal beliefs of the Church became summarized by the 29 Prominent Teachings.

1. Repentance
2. Justification
3. Regeneration
4. Born Again
5. Sanctification
6. Holiness
7. Water Baptism
8. Baptism With the Holy Ghost
9. Speaking in Tongues
10. Full Restoration of the Gifts to the Church
11. Signs Following Believers
12. Fruit of the Spirit
13. Divine Healing
14. The Lord's Supper
15. Washing the Saints' Feet
16. Tithing and Giving
17. Restitution Where Possible
18. Pre-Millennial Second Coming of Jesus
19. Resurrection
20. Eternal Life for the Righteous
21. Eternal Punishment for the Wicked
22. Total abstinence from liquor or strong drink
23. Against the use of tobacco, opium, morphine, etc.
24. On Meats and Drinks
25. On the Sabbath
26. Against Wearing Gold for Ornament
27. Lodge/Secret Society Membership (historically Against Belonging to Lodges)
28. Wholesome Speech of the Believer (historically against swearing)
29. Against Divorce and Remarriage Evil
