= Rosebud, Georgia =

Rosebud
- Unincorporated community
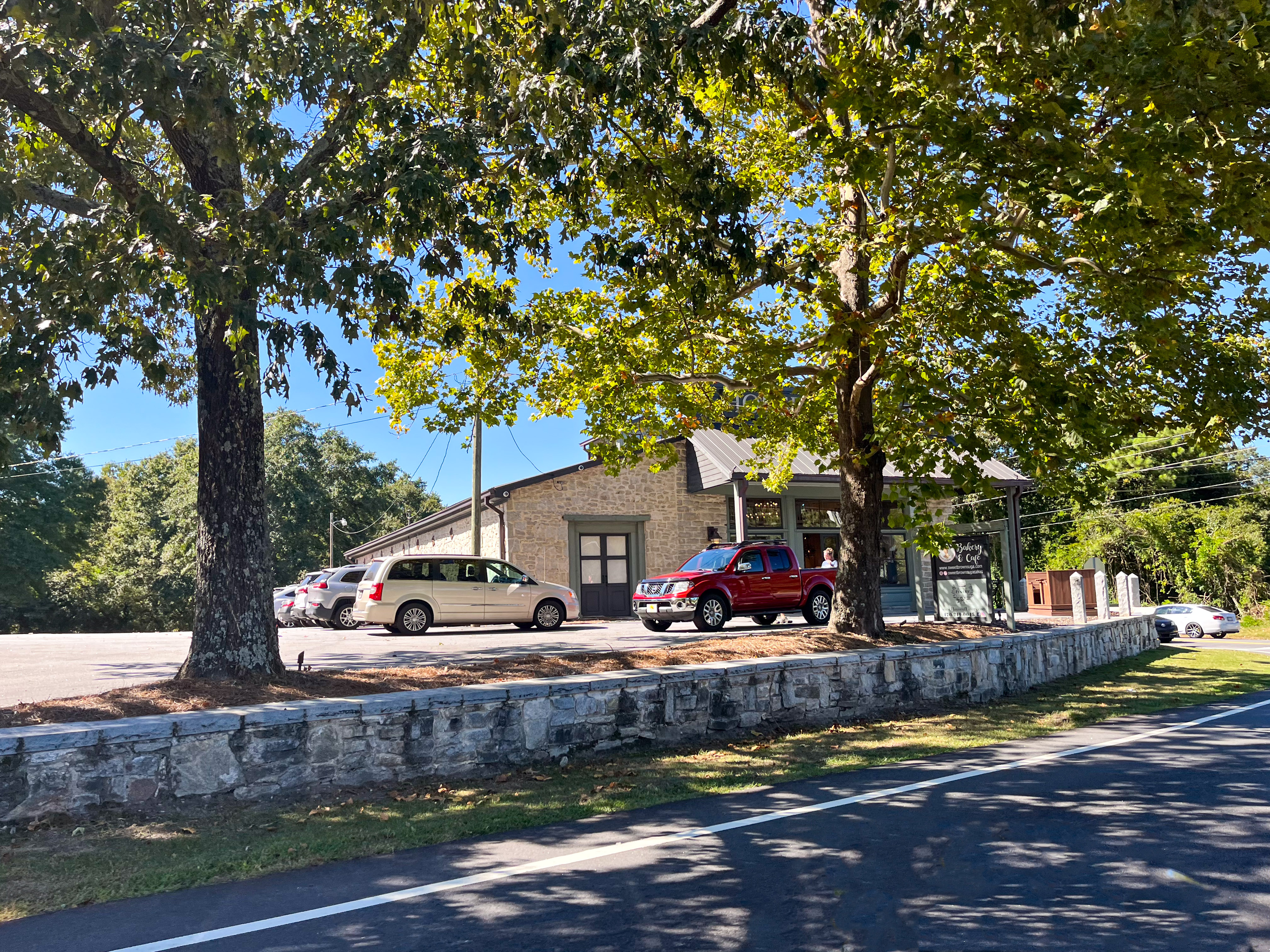
- Rosebud and Centerville-Rosebud Rd area

- Location within the state of Georgia
- Coordinates: 33°47′55″N 83°58′0″W
- Country: United States
- State: Georgia
- County: Gwinnett
- Elevation: 902 ft (275 m)
- Time zone: UTC-5 (Eastern (EST))
  - Summer (DST): UTC-4 (EDT)
- GNIS feature ID: 332922

Rosebud is an unincorporated community located in Gwinnett County, Georgia, United States.
