= Church of God, House of Prayer =

Holiness Pentecostal body of Christians

- Classification: Pentecostal
- Orientation: Holiness Pentecostal
- Founder: Harrison W. Poteat
- Origin: 1939; Markleysburg, Pennsylvania

The Church of God, House of Prayer is a Holiness Pentecostal body of Christians.

== History ==
The Church of God, House of Prayer, founded in 1939 by Harrison W. Poteat and incorporated in 1966, is doctrinally similar to the Church of God (Cleveland). They are Trinitarian and Arminian in theology, holding a premillennial view of eschatology. Other beliefs include the baptism of the Holy Ghost, evidenced by glossolalia; water baptism by immersion; the Lord's supper and feet washing for believers only; and that the atonement provides not only for spiritual rebirth, but also for healing and deliverance from evil spirits.

== Organization ==
In 1979, the Church of God, House of Prayer had 24 churches in the eastern United States, and 2 churches in eastern Canada. The estimated membership was 1200. Local congregations are "integral parts" of the General Assembly of the Church of God, House of Prayer, and are subject to the General Assembly and its officials. Headquarters are in Markleysburg, Pennsylvania.
