= Esther G. Frame =

American minister and evangelist (1840–1920)

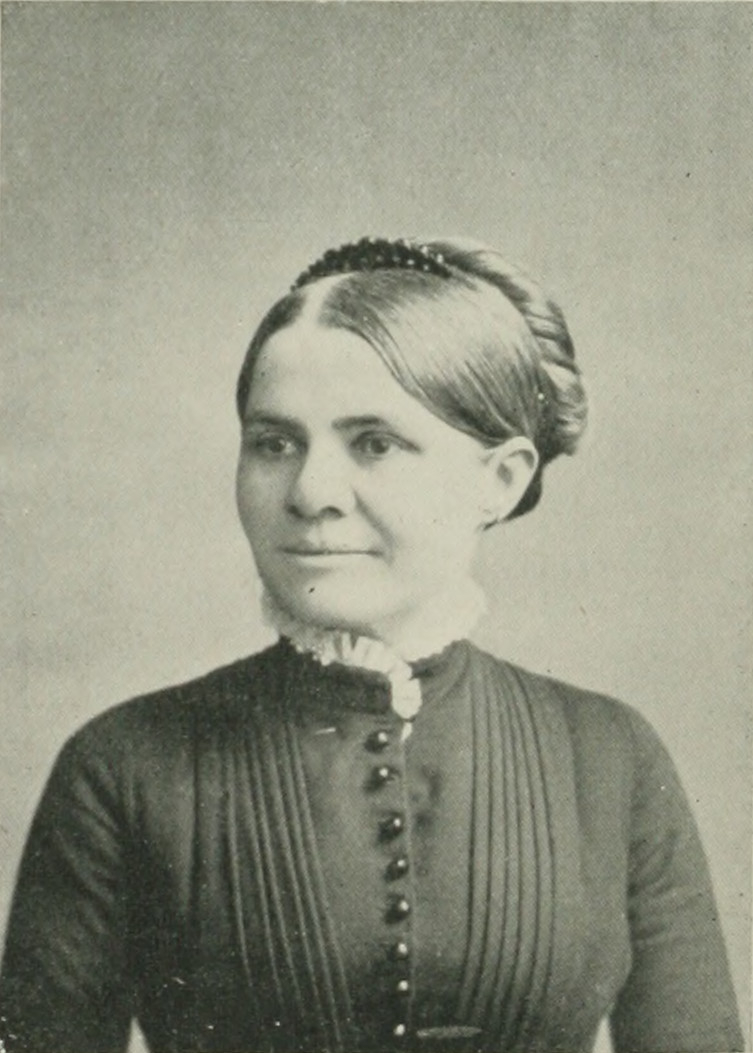
- Born: Esther Ellen Gordon; July 10, 1840; Washington, Indiana, U.S.
- Died: June 11, 1920; El Paso, Texas, U.S.
- Occupations: minister; evangelist
- Years active: 40
- Spouse: Nathan T. Frame (m. 1857; died 1914)
- Children: 3
- Religion: Society of Friends
- Ordained: 1869
- Writings: The Reminiscences of Nathan T. Frame and Esther G. Frame

Esther Ellen Frame (née Gordon; July 10, 1840 – June 11, 1920) was an American minister and evangelist. She was a minister of the Society of Friends church for over 40 years, often working closely with ministers of other denominations. The Reminiscences of Nathan T. Frame and Esther G. Frame (Cleveland, Ohio, The Britton Printing Co., 1907), served as an outline of their work covering the period of 1868 through 1906.

== Early life and education ==
Esther Ellen Gordon was born in Washington, Indiana on July 10, 1840. Her father was born in Hamilton County, Ohio, and his ancestors came from the Scottish Highlands about the year 1720, and were Scotch-Irish. They were descendants of the Clan Gordon, who, for many years, intermarried only with the Clan Douglas. Grandfather Gordon was educated for a Scotch Presbyterian minister, but left that denomination and joined the Baptists, because there were no Scotch Presbyterians where he was teaching school, for he was one of the first educators, and taught a number of years in Warren County, Ohio and Montgomery County, Ohio, and also in the State of Indiana. Grandmother Gordon was a McGary and came from the Northern part of Ireland, and General Grant was a descendant of Grandmother Gordon's sister. Grandfather McGary preached until he was ninety years old. In early life, her father resided in Centerville, Indiana, and there studied law. From Centerville he removed to Thorntown, Indiana, and in 1854, represented Boone County in the Indiana Legislature. In 1856, he went to Salem, Iowa, and was there admitted to the bar as a lawyer.

Deborah Mendenhall, Esther Frame's mother, was born in New Garden, Guilford County, North Carolina. Her people were inclined to the learned professions. They were English and in England, their name was Milden; after the name of their estate, or manor “Milden-Hall.” But after coming to the U.S., the name became corrupted into Mendenhall, by which they continued to be known. Her mother's people came from Guilford County, near Greensboro, North Carolina, to Wayne County, Indiana. They were members of the Society of Friends. Grandmother Mendenhall was an elder in the Friends Church.

When Esther was four years old, the family went from Wayne County, Indiana, to Salem, Iowa. While there, she attended her first school-a private school for young children. Later, she attended a Seminary where Reuben Dorland, a Friend, was principal. From Salem, Iowa, the family removed to Boone County, Indiana. There she attended for a time a private school taught by a Presbyterian minister's wife. Then, from choice, she attended Friends school, 1 mile (1.6 km) from Thorntown. When the Methodists built their Academy in Thorntown, Esther's parents thought best that she should go there. She also joined the Methodist Episcopal Church. She attended Blue River Seminary in the southern part of Indiana, her brother, Luther Gordon, being the principal of this school. Esther's father was then a member of the Indiana State Legislature.

Some years after this, they removed to Salem, Iowa, where Esther first met Nathan T. Frame.

== Career ==
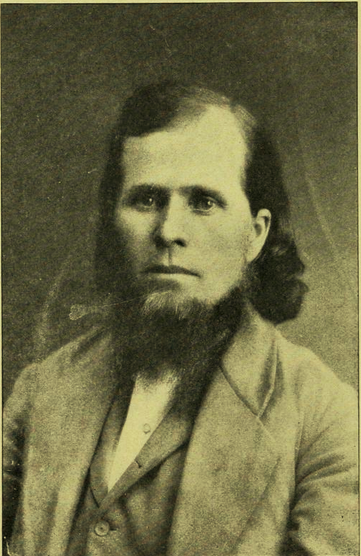
Nathan T. Frame.

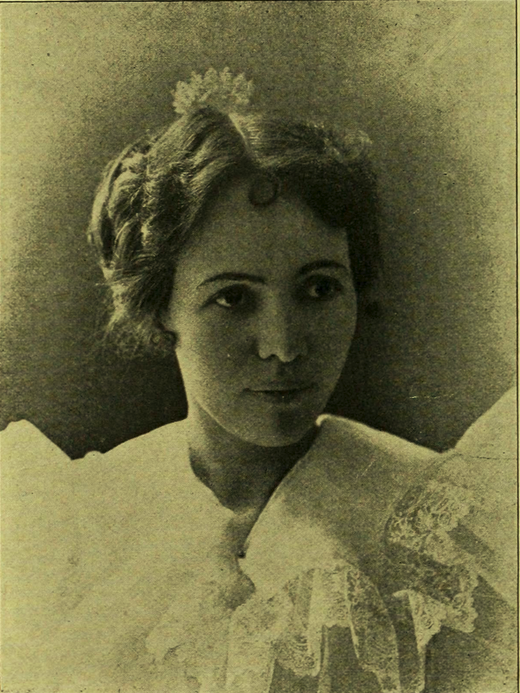
Itasca Frame Wooton.

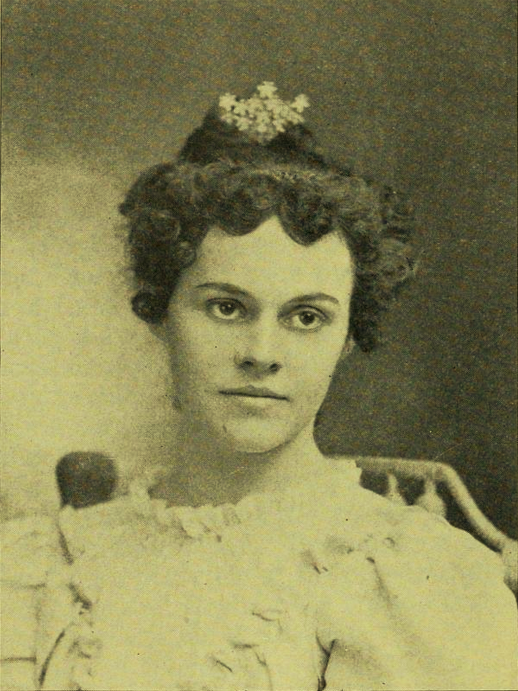
Corrinne Frame McCarthy.

In March 1857, she and Nathan Frame married. Esther farmed during the spring and summer, or until the crop season was over, and taught school in the winter -- three or four months usually. They soon earned and saved enough money to purchase a home in the town of Salem, Iowa, and continued to attend the Methodist meetings. They had three children, one of whom, a boy, Hiram, died in infancy, and two daughters, Itasca M., and Esther Corinne.

She frequently went to Quaker meetings, especially when some "traveling friend" came along and had an "appointed meeting". About this time, Esther's health became poor and she went to Indiana, taking Corrinne, the baby with her, and leaving Itasca with Nathan at Salem. Esther had already made known to her mother that she felt called to preach, and it had become known among some of the prominent members of the church. Some sympathized with her and encouraged her, while others did not think it was a woman's place to preach, yet all encouraged her in gospel work.

As soon as she was well enough, Esther came home. Her health at this time was very delicate and she was often prostrated from nervous headache. Feeling that she was called to preach and that the Methodists would not ordain her, she joined the Society of Friends and was ordained a minister by them. She began her ministry in New Garden Friends Meeting, in Richmond, Indiana, 1869.

Her ministry was not confined to her own denomination. For more than twenty years, with her husband, who was a minister, she preached as an evangelist among all the principal churches of the U.S. In 1901, she held a series of meetings in Whittier, California.

== Personal life ==
Beginning in 1880, she made her home in Jamestown, Ohio. Frame also lived in El Paso, Texas for a number of years, during the latter years of her husband's life time and the residence in El Paso of her daughter, whose husband was head of the department of biology and geology at State College (now University of Texas at El Paso) for nearly 20 years. She returned to El Paso with her daughter in September 1919. Esther Gordon Frame died in El Paso, Texas, June 11, 1920.

== Selected works ==
Reminiscences

- The Reminiscences of Nathan T. Frame and Esther G. Frame (1907) (Text)
