= Fields of the Wood =

Religious park in North Carolina, United States

Coordinates: 35°07′14″N 84°15′08″W

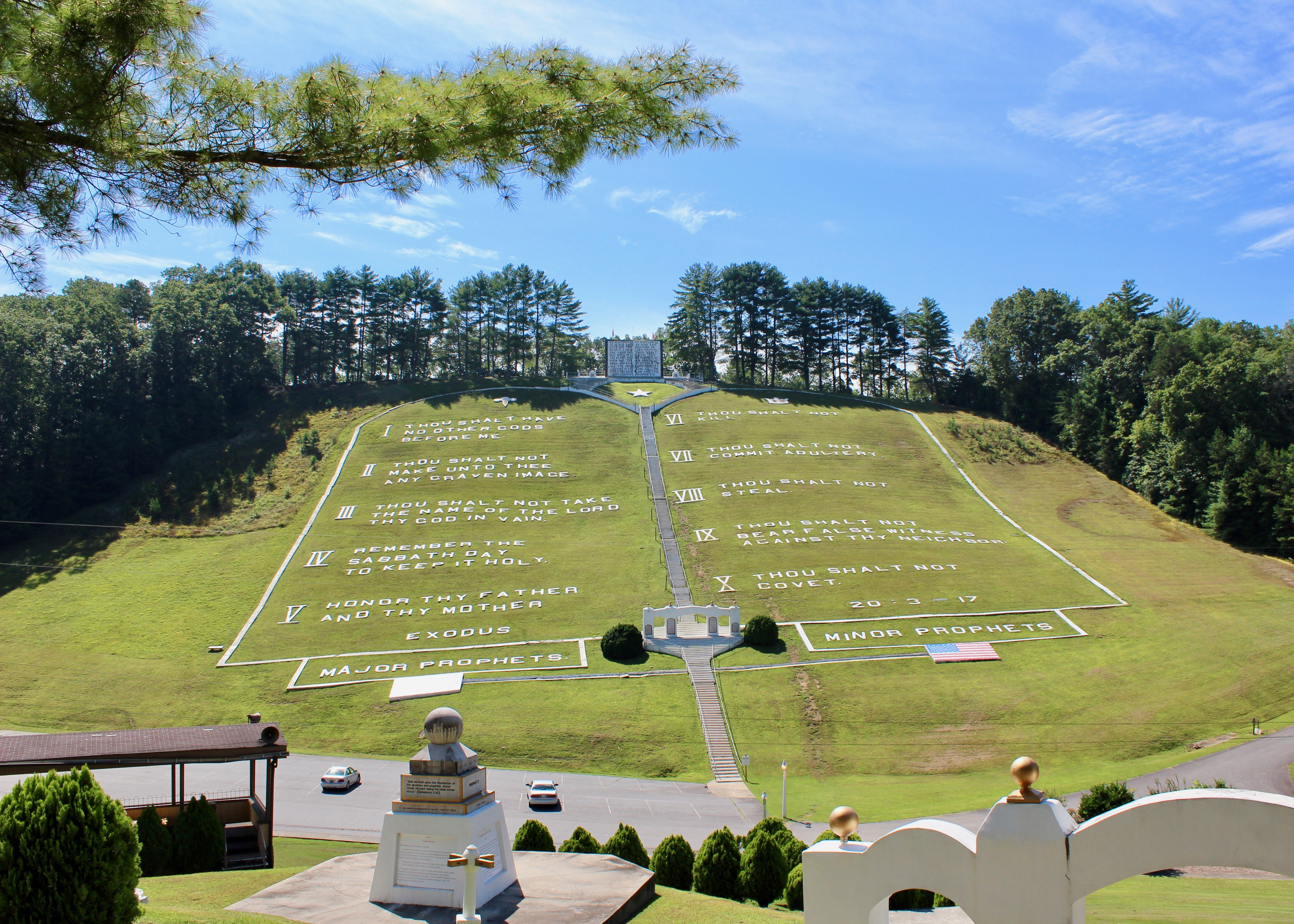
A 300-foot-wide representation of the Ten Commandments, Burger Mountain, Fields of the Wood, Cherokee County, North Carolina.

Fields of the Wood is a Christian religious park of more than 200 acres (81 ha) in Cherokee County, North Carolina, owned by the Church of God of Prophecy—a Holiness Pentecostal denomination. It is best known for the largest representation of the Ten Commandments in the world, measuring 300 feet (91 m) wide across a mountainside.

== History ==
Fields of the Wood was the creation of A. J. Tomlinson (1865-1943), ultimate founder of the several Holiness Pentecostal denominations called the Church of God, five of which have headquarters in Cleveland, Tennessee. In 1940, Tomlinson, as head of the Church of God of Prophecy, returned to the area to memorialize the place where he said God had revealed to him the true church in 1903—he having realized that in the same year he had founded the Church in the extreme southwestern county of North Carolina, the Wright Brothers had made their first successful flight in the extreme far eastern part of the state. Tomlinson believed that the same chapter in the Book of Isaiah had predicted both. Tomlinson named the park "Fields of the Wood" after a reference in the King James Version of Psalms 132: 6: "We found it in the fields of the wood." In 1941, Tomlinson dedicated the site with a sermon while church-leased airplanes dropped gospel tracts to fulfill Deuteronomy 32: 2: "May my teaching drop as the rain." Some temporary markers were placed on the site in 1940, but most permanent construction occurred after 1943 under the direction of Tomlinson's son, M. A. Tomlinson, and other leaders of the Church of God of Prophecy.

== Points of interest ==
Fields of the Wood includes numerous markers and monuments, some of significance to Christians generally and others only to members of the Church of God of Prophecy. These include representations of the three crosses on Golgotha and The Garden Tomb; a baptismal pool; "Prayer Mountain," featuring 29 monuments with quotations from the Bible and four markers summarizing the history of the Church of God of Prophecy; and at the top, a "Prayed and Prevailed" marker where written prayers are often left by visitors. Nearby is a small airplane retired from the "White Angel Fleet."

On the opposite Burger Mountain is a representation of the Ten Commandments with letters 5 feet (1.5 m) high and 4 feet (1.2 m) wide, bordered with one-foot (0.30 m) concrete sections measuring 300 feet (91 m) from side-to-side. At the top of the mountain a concrete "All Nations Cross" is the outlined on the ground with 86 flag poles flying flags of some of the countries where the Church has ministries. When the park was built, it was the largest Christian cross in the world. Three short hiking trails lead down from the mountain to restrooms, picnic tables, a gift shop, and a café. The site has no campground or large preaching venue.

About 1/2 mile (0.80 km) from the park are related sites of historical and devotional importance to the Church of God, including the house where the first General Assembly met in 1906, the site of a school where 1896 religious meetings included the practice of glossolalia, and a marker commemorating the location of the Holiness Church at Camp Creek, a predecessor of the Church of God.

== Accolades ==
Fields of the Wood was voted as the best attraction in Cherokee County in the Cherokee Scout newspaper's 2023, 2024, and 2026 Readers' Choice awards.
