= Church of God (Cleveland, Tennessee) =

Pentecostal Christian denomination

- Cross with wave of the Holy Spirit
- Classification: Protestant
- Orientation: Pentecostal
- Theology: Holiness Pentecostal
- Polity: Episcopal
- General Overseer: Gary J. Lewis
- Associations: National Association of Evangelicals; Pentecostal/Charismatic Churches of North America; Wesleyan Holiness Consortium
- Headquarters: Cleveland, Tennessee,
- Founder: Elder Richard Spurling and several others
- Origin: August 1886; Monroe County, Tennessee; Cherokee County, North Carolina
- Separations: Church of God of Prophecy, Church of God with Signs Following, The (Original) Church of God
- Official website: churchofgod.org

The Church of God, with headquarters in Cleveland, Tennessee, United States, is an international Holiness-Pentecostal Christian denomination. The Church of God's publishing house is Pathway Press.

== Name ==
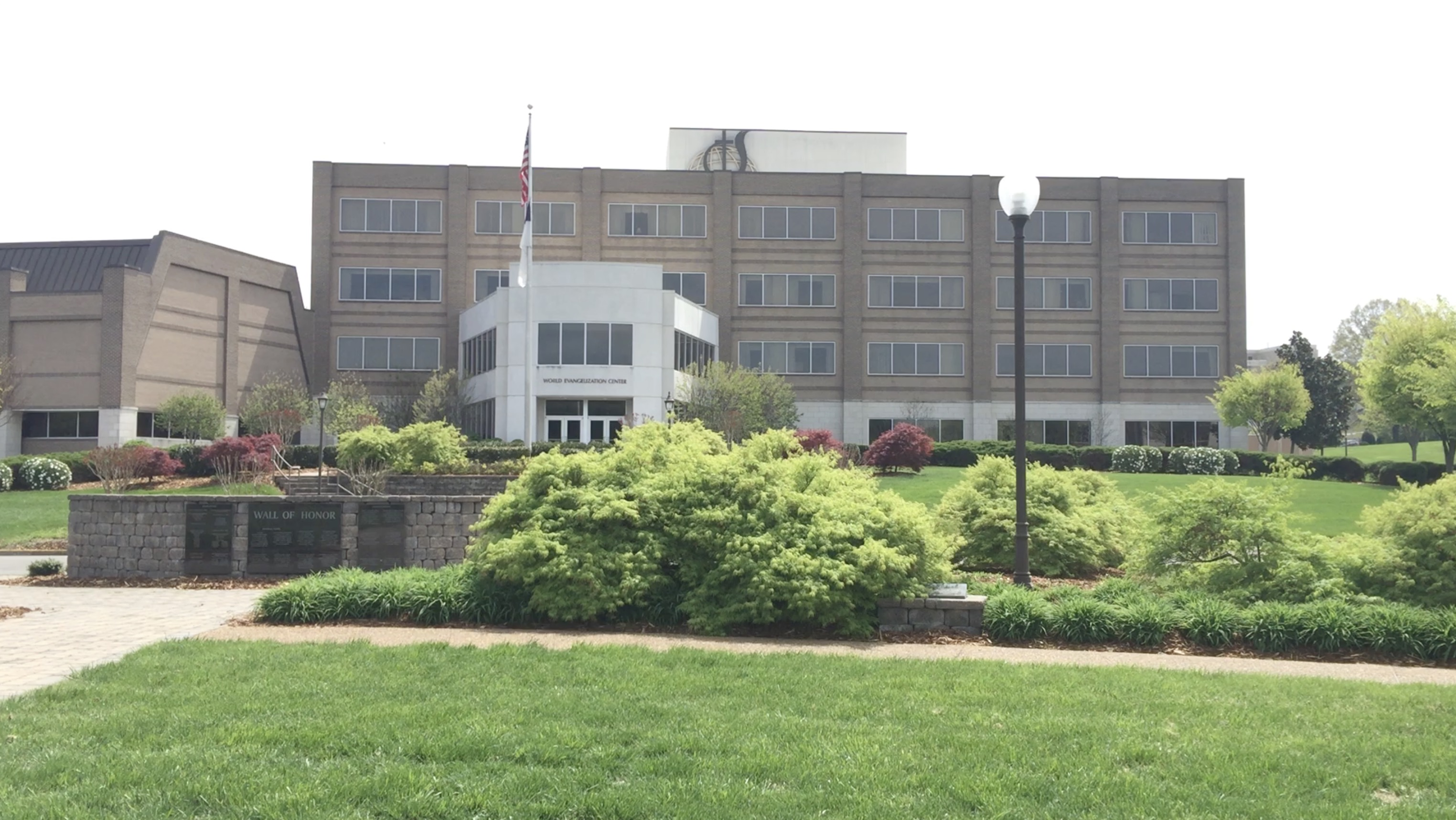
Church of God International Headquarters in Cleveland, Tennessee

The precise legal name of this body is "Church of God". After a protracted court case involving donations intended for the use of its orphanages being received by other groups using the same name, the Supreme Court of Tennessee determined that it alone was entitled to use the simple name Church of God in 1953.

== History ==
=== Origins (1886–1902) ===
R. G. Spurling (1857–1935), a Missionary Baptist minister, and his father Richard Spurling (1810–91), an ordained elder, rejected some of the views of the Baptists in his area as not being in accord with New Testament Christianity. R. G. Spurling disagreed with Landmarkism, an ecclesiology which held that only churches descending from churches with Baptist doctrine were part of the true Church, and that they should not associate with Christians of other traditions. Spurling felt that there needed to be another reformation of the Church that went beyond the Protestant Reformation so that Christians would be united together by love and not by creeds, which he believed were divisive. As long as something was not contrary to the New Testament, believers should be able to practice their faith in the form they chose.

Even though not intending to form a new church or denomination, their rejection of Landmarkist values placed them in conflict with traditional churches in that area. Within a short period of time, it became clear that they would not be allowed to remain as members of their churches. After being barred from his local Baptist church, R.G. Spurling and eight others organized the Christian Union at the Barney Creek Meeting House on August 19, 1886 in Monroe County, Tennessee. They agreed to free themselves from man-made creeds and unite upon the principles of the New Testament. Spurling organized three other congregations between 1889 and 1895, all with the name Christian Union, each functioning independently under Baptist polity. While this group would later disband and its members return to their original churches, the Church of God traces its origins to this 1886 meeting.

In 1896, three Tennessee evangelists (William Martin, Joe M. Tipton, and Milton McNabb) with links to Benjamin H. Irwin's Fire-Baptized Holiness Church brought the message of entire sanctification to the western North Carolina countryside when they held a revival in the Shearer Schoolhouse near Camp Creek in Cherokee County. A feature of this revival was that some participants, including children, spoke in tongues when they experienced sanctification (this was later understood to be the baptism of the Holy Ghost, as spoken of in Acts 2). This phenomenon caused great excitement and controversy in the community, and leading Baptist and Methodist leaders soon denounced the revival. Several of the worshiper's homes, as well as a provisional meeting house were burned by mobs opposing the new revival.

The worshipers began to meet in the house of William F. Bryant (1863–1949), a Baptist deacon prior to his joining the holiness movement, who assumed leadership of the group. Spurling often worshiped with the small fellowship and was the driving force behind its 1902 decision to organize into a church, called the Holiness Church at Camp Creek. Organization was made necessary because Irwin's more fanatical teachings were influencing the movement, and there was a need for authority to discipline erring members.

=== Tomlinson era (1903–1923) ===
It would be Ambrose Jessup Tomlinson and his organizational skills, however, that would be responsible for the growth of the Camp Creek Holiness Church into a national denomination. A Quaker and colporteur (the publishing and distribution of religious materials) for the American Bible Society, Tomlinson had received the sanctification experience (but had not spoken in tongues) and had connections with Frank Sandford's Shiloh church in Durham, Maine. While not an ordained minister, churches often invited him to preach. The church at Camp Creek had known Tomlinson for seven years before they asked him to join their church in 1903. After climbing what is now known as Prayer Mountain in Murphy, North Carolina (located within the Fields of the Wood park), and reportedly being divinely assured that this fledgling church was indeed God's reestablishment of the New Testament church, Tomlinson joined the church and was soon elected its pastor. This allowed Spurling and Bryant to pursue evangelism. Fourteen new members were added to the church in the first year of Tomlinson's pastorate, and other churches were soon established in Georgia and Tennessee.

By 1905, there was a desire for greater organization among the churches. Thus, delegates from four churches met at Camp Creek (approximately a mile northwest of Fields of the Wood) in January 1906 to conduct the 1st General Assembly of the "Churches of East Tennessee, North Georgia, and Western North Carolina." Though the intention was still to avoid the creation of a creed and denomination, the members' consensus on certain endeavors and standards laid the groundwork for the future denomination. The Assembly declared, "We hope and trust that no person or body of people will ever use these minutes, or any part of them, as articles of faith upon which to establish a sect or denomination," and that the General Assembly was not "a legislative or executive body, [but] judicial only." The 1st Assembly decided that foot washing was on the same level as the sacrament of communion and, like other holiness groups, condemned the use of tobacco. Tomlinson served as moderator and secretary. The name "Church of God" was adopted in 1907, and Tomlinson was elected general overseer in 1909.

The Church of God was a part of the holiness movement and believed in entire sanctification as a definite experience occurring after salvation. While individuals had spoken in tongues in the 1896 revival, tongues were not yet understood by the Church of God to be the initial evidence of baptism in the Holy Spirit. As news of the Azusa Street Revival began to spread and reach the Southeast, Church of God adherents began, more and more, to seek and obtain Spirit baptism. Tomlinson was one of these seekers. In June 1907, he traveled to Birmingham, Alabama, to attend a meeting of M. M. Pinson and Gaston B. Cashwell. Cashwell had returned to the South after being baptized in the Spirit at Azusa Street, spreading the revival and bringing many holiness groups into the Pentecostal fold. Tomlinson invited Cashwell to preach in Cleveland, Tennessee. It was there, under Cashwell's preaching, that Tomlinson received the Pentecostal blessing. After Tomlinson's experience, the Church of God's emphasis changed from being mainly holiness in nature, to being both holiness and Pentecostal, and it has identified that way ever since.

In 1910, the official publication, "The Church of God Evangel," was founded, and it remains the oldest continuous Pentecostal publication. Growth followed in the years after organization. There was one church with 20 members in 1902. By 1910, there were 1,005 members in 31 churches throughout the Southeastern United States.

== Statistics ==
The denomination reported that in 2024, they had 47,897 churches and 9.2 million members and over 15 million worship attenders in 197 countries. The United States Religion Census of 2010 found that there were 1,109,992 members and 6,100 churches in the US. In 2020, the United States Religion Census found that there were 868,446 members and 5,921 churches in the US, a decline from the 2010 figures.

== Clergy ==
The Church of God recognizes three ranks of credentialed ministers: Exhorter (initial level), Ordained Minister (intermediate level), and Ordained Bishop (highest level). Exhorters are authorized to preach, serve as evangelists, and serve as pastor of a church. Ordained Ministers are further authorized to baptize converts, receive new church members, administer sacraments or ordinances, solemnize marriages, and establish churches. In addition to the rights and privileges held by Exhorters and Ordained Ministers, Ordained Bishops are authorized to assist in ordination ceremonies. State/regional overseers are designated "Administrative Bishops," International Executive Committee members as "Executive Bishops," and the General Overseer as "Presiding Bishop." Women are eligible to be Exhorters and Ordained Ministers; however, only men can become Ordained Bishops. There are also categories of Licensed Minister of Christian Education and Licensed Minister of Music.

== Beliefs ==
The church has a Pentecostal confession of faith known in the Church of God as the Declaration of Faith.

== Structure ==
=== International ===
The Church of God is a hierarchical church with an episcopal polity. The Church of God's highest judicial body is the International General Assembly. This body has "full power and authority to designate the teaching, government, principles, and practices" of the Church of God. Meeting every two years, the General Assembly's voting membership includes all lay members, credentialed ministers of the Church of God, and members 16 years of age or older, but to vote one must be present and registered. The General Assembly is responsible for electing the church's executive officers. These are the general overseer, the three assistant general overseers, and the secretary general. In addition, it elects the directors of the church's missionary and Christian education ministries.

== Higher education ==
The Church of God operates Lee University, a Christian Liberal Arts university in Cleveland, Tennessee, established in 1918. In response to the need for a graduate seminary, the Church of God Graduate School of Christian Ministries opened in 1975. Its name was changed to the Church of God School of Theology, Church of God Theological Seminary, and most recently to the Pentecostal Theological Seminary (PTS) with the hopes of appealing to a broader student base.

=== Related bodies ===
- Church of God (Chattanooga) (org. 1917)
- Church of God with Signs Following (org. circa 1922)
- Church of God of Prophecy (org. 1923)
- Church of God, House of Prayer (org. 1939)
- Church of God (Huntsville, Alabama) (org. 1943)
- The Church of God (Jerusalem Acres) (org. 1957)
- The Church of God for All Nations (org. 1981)
- Church of God (Charleston, Tennessee) (org. 1993)

=== Recent history ===
In 2024, the denomination had 8.6 million members worldwide, growing from 6 million in 2007. During this 17 years, the Church of God denomination added over 2.6 million members to their fellowship.

== Notable ministers ==
- Charles Paul Conn – Chancellor of Lee University
- Raymond Culpepper – Former General Overseer x2 8 years total, a total of 18 years on the executive committee, as well as 12 years on the Executive Council,
- Marcus Lamb – Founder of Daystar Television Network
- Jentezen Franklin – Pastor, Free Chapel
- Robert F. Cook - Founder, Church of God In India

== See also ==
- List of colleges and seminaries affiliated with the Church of God (Cleveland)
- Church of God (Anderson, Indiana)
- Church of God (Guthrie, Oklahoma)
- Church of God (Huntsville, Alabama)
- The Church of God (Charleston, Tennessee)
- Protestantism in the United States
- List of the largest Protestant bodies
- Christianity in the United States
- Pentecostalism

== Bibliography ==
- Conn, Charles W. Where the Saints Have Trod: A History of Church of God Missions. Cleveland: Pathway Press, 1957.
- Robins, R.G. Tomlinson. Plainfolk Modernist. Oxford: University Press, 2004.
