= R. G. Spurling =

Richard Green Spurling (28 July 1858 - 24 May 1935) was an American Christian minister. Born in Monroe County, Tennessee, he was one of the founders of the Church of God.

His father, Richard Spurling (1810 - 1891) was an ordained Baptist elder, who presided over the founding of the church on August 10, 1886. R. G. Spurling was chosen as its minister and ordained a month later.

== Career ==
The Spurlings held a meeting at their family grist mill in Tennessee on Thursday, August 19, 1886, to see if there was interest in starting a new church in the area. At that meeting, a new Christian Union church was established.

Spurling Jr held a Revival meeting in Liberty, Tennessee in 1892 during which some members spoke in tongues.

In summer 1896 the CU led to a ten-day revival in the Shearer Schoolhouse in Camp Creek, North Carolina. The meetings brought a “spirit of revival” with more speaking in tongues. Meetings continued in people's homes after the ten days. Methodist preacher W. F. Bryant joined the Spurlings at this revival. The Shearer Schoolhouse Revival predated the Azusa Street Revival by nearly a decade and may be seen as the start of the Pentecostal Movement.

On May 15, 1902 the CU changed its name to the “Holiness Church at Camp Creek”. In 1903, Quaker preacher Ambrose Jessup Tomlinson joined the church.

In 1907, Tomlinson changed the name from "Holiness Church" to "Church of God".
