= Ambrose Jessup Tomlinson =

American Pentecostal bishop

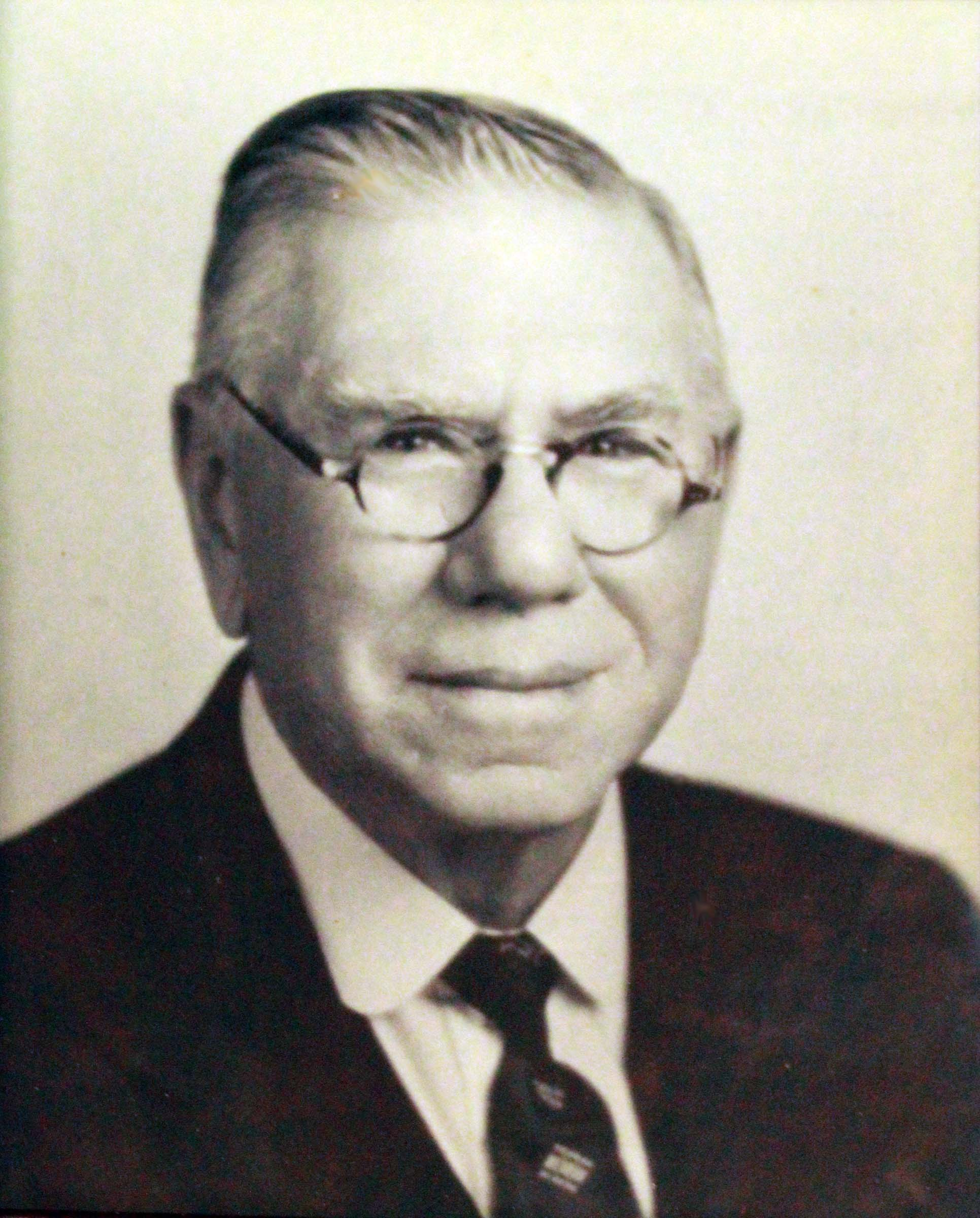
- A.J. Tomlinson
- Born: Ambrose Jessup Tomlinson; September 22, 1865; Westfield, Indiana, U.S.
- Died: October 2, 1943 (aged 78); Cleveland, Tennessee, U.S.
- Occupations: General overseer Bishop; Pastor; Evangelist
- Spouse: Mary Jane (Taylor) Tomlinson
- Children: Halcy Tomlinson, Homer A. Tomlinson, Iris Tomlinson, Milton A. Tomlinson
- Religion: Pentecostal Christian
- Ordained: Christian Union (Camp Creek, North Carolina), later known as the Church of God of Prophecy
- Congregations served: North Cleveland Church of God, Cleveland, TN
- Offices held: General Overseer, Church of God (Cleveland, Tennessee) (1903–1923); General Overseer, Church of God of Prophecy (1903–1943)
- Title: Bishop

Ambrose Jessup "A.J." Tomlinson (September 22, 1865 – October 2, 1943), a former Quaker, united with the Holiness Church at Camp Creek in 1903. With his drive, vision, and organizational skills, he was elected the first general overseer of the Church of God (Cleveland, Tennessee) in 1903. He also served as the first president of the church's Lee College, later known as Lee University (1918–1922). In 1923, Tomlinson was impeached, causing a division which led to the creation, by followers of Tomlinson, of what would become the Church of God of Prophecy.

== Early life ==
A.J. Tomlinson was born to a prominent Quaker family near Westfield, Indiana. His grandparents, Robert and Lydia Tomlinson, left the Society of Friends in 1843 over the issue of abolition, and joined a separatist anti-slavery Society of Friends. A year later, in 1844, A.J. Tomlinson's parents, Milton and Delilah (Hiatt) Tomlinson, were disowned from the Society of Friends for not having their marriage sanctioned by the Friends, and for neglecting church attendance. Milton and Delilah Tomlinson never regularly attended Quaker services after that, hence their children including A.J. Tomlinson were not raised attending church.

Milton Tomlinson, together with his brother Noah, was a successful businessman in a variety of ventures spanning farming, road-building, saw-mills, and bridge building. Milton Tomlinson was also active in Republican Party politics.

A.J. Tomlinson was the only son born to Milton and Delilah Tomlinson. He had eight sisters, three of whom died in childhood, and one half-sister, named Abigail, from his father Milton's first marriage. (Milton's first wife, Hannah, had died giving birth to Abigail). Five of his sisters were older than A.J. Tomlinson, to whom he looked up to as a child.

A.J. Tomlinson was born significantly under-weight, so small that as an infant he was carried on a pillow. His mother, concerned over his small size and the care he would require is said to have prayed "If this child is never going to amount to anything let him die. He is such a care. If Thou hast something special for him to do, heal him up and let him live.". A.J. Tomlinson survived but was never as tall or physically robust as his father. In 1880 A.J. Tomlinson suffered a bout with cholera, an illness which claimed the life of his sister Emily one year later. A.J. Tomlinson's own illness was severe enough to cause him to miss a third of a school year. Nevertheless, as a child A.J. Tomlinson enjoyed athletics and was particularly successful at footraces. He was also gifted academically and was encouraged to practice writing at home by his father.

A.J. Tomlinson graduated grammar school at the age of seventeen and immediately enrolled in the local Quaker academy, Union High School, in Westfield, Indiana, a town known for its religious and racial diversity. His first year at Union, during the winter of 1882–1883, the Quaker evangelist William Wooton held an extended meeting at a local church, during which some 100 of Tomlinson's classmates were converted. Tomlinson, while experiencing deep conviction, was not himself converted.

As a teenager Tomlinson began engaging in Republican Party politics (although later, at the age of 27 in 1892, Tomlinson ran unsuccessfully for county auditor under the banner of the Populist Party (a political movement closely tied to the ideals of holiness Christianity), after which he quit politics altogether). As a teenager Tomlinson also belonged to a local literary society, and performed briefly in a drama troupe, besides continuing to work on the family farm. At the age of 23, in 1889, A.J. Tomlinson married Mary Jane Taylor, herself an active Quaker and member of the Walnut Ridge Monthly Meeting, where a significant holiness revival (the "Great Walnut Ridge Revival") had occurred in 1867.

== Conversion ==
At the age of twelve, two years after the death of both his paternal grandparents, Robert and Lydia Tomlinson, A.J. Tomlinson had his first religious experience, as told in his brief autobiography, Answering The Call of God:

One day while father and myself were alone in the field a mile from home, sawing a large log with an old-fashioned "Hoosier" cross-cut saw, I heard my name called, and thought father spoke to me. It was my familiar, family, pet name, but father said he did not speak it. In a few minutes I heard the same voice and the same name. Again father said he did not say a word. I was in a state of wonder. After a stillness of several minutes the voice spoke again, with that familiarity that is only recognized by the closest family ties. Father still said he did not call me nor speak my name. I was mystified, and although I never spoke to a soul about it, and father never said anything about it, it was enough to awaken a nature that had never been touched before, and it was awakened to never sleep again.

Shortly after his marriage in 1889, Tomlinson experienced salvation after a bolt of lightning struck his home during a severe thunderstorm. Again Tomlinson recounts the episode in his autobiography, Answering The Call of God:

The first year of my married life I was one day engaged in hauling hay from one of those large Indiana meadows. A storm came up, and the men and myself hurried in to the barn with what hay we had on the wagons. I ran on to the house so Mary would not be by herself during the storm. It was a very severe storm, with much lightning and heavy thunder. Suddenly a heavier peal of thunder than usual sounded so as to almost deafen us. Wife suggested that the lightning had struck the barn, but I said, "No, dear, it's the house." I saw the flash of lightning as it crashed down the chimney, out through the cook stove, and burst out through the ceiling and weatherboarding of the house only a few feet from where I was sitting. No serious damage was done, but it had an effect on me.

That evening after supper I said to Wife, "It's time for us to pray," so I got the Bible someone had given her (up to that time I did not care anything about the Bible) and read a few verses, and down we went to prayer. No doubt I was very awkward, but I was sincere. I meant everything I said. Wife had been a Christian for some time, and could pray, but it was my first experience in that way. Nothing much was accomplished that night, but I never let up until I got a real experience of salvation.

== Influences ==
After his conversion A.J. Tomlinson became active in the local Quaker church, the Chester Preparative Meeting of the Society of Friends, that had been founded by his grandfather Robert. The area was frequented by many prominent holiness Quaker evangelists (such as Seth Cook Rees) and biblical scholars (such as Dougan Clark, Jr.). The area also welcomed fiery revivalists (such as Charles Stalker), and Quakers in Chester Preparative openly associated with Methodists (such as Esther G. Frame). As such, A.J. Tomlinson's earliest religious influences followed the evangelical Quaker holiness teachings of Joseph John Gurney. In particular, holiness Quakers embraced emotional preaching, religious ecstasy, entire sanctification, aggressive evangelism, and the Wesleyan doctrine of Christian Perfection. Holiness Quakers also adopted the Methodists' use of tent meetings and extended revivals, techniques which A.J. Tomlinson himself would employ later in ministry. However, in the late nineteenth century, holiness Quakers did not practice water baptism, in contrast to most other holiness sects of the time.

Nearby Indianapolis, Indiana was home to several other noted holiness evangelists at the time, most importantly Thomas Nelson before he moved to Pennsylvania and came out of the Free Methodist Church. Later in ministry Tomlinson interacted directly with Nelson, but he may have begun to be influenced by Nelson in the early 1890s.

Tomlinson's next major influence came from the Methodist colporteur J.B. Mitchell. A convert of the Presbyterian revivalist Charles Finney, Mitchell tutored Tomlinson and took him on trips to distribute religious literature (provided by the American Bible Society) to impoverished areas of southern Appalachia beginning in the summer of 1894. The areas they visited included Culberson, North Carolina, (where Tomlinson and Mitchell established a Christian school and orphanage in 1899), and Camp Creek, North Carolina (where Tomlinson first met Richard G. Spurling Jr and W.F. Bryant, the founders of the "Holiness Church at Camp Creek" with whom he would unite in 1903).

On December 3, 1896, Tomlinson received official authorization from the Quaker Westfield Monthly Meeting to engage in an extended missionary trip. During the summer and fall of 1897, he visited a variety of missionary and biblical training grounds across eighteen different states. Most importantly, he visited Frank Sandford's "Holy Ghost and Us" Bible School in Durham, Maine, where he was baptized in the Androscoggin River on October 30, 1897—a significant departure from Quaker teachings.

During this period many prominent holiness evangelists, including Martin Wells Knapp and Frank Rees, began to leave their denomination in favor of independent ministries. Frank Sandford's Shiloh movement typified such independent holiness churches, and Sandford forcefully encouraged his followers to leave their old denominations, as Sandford himself had left the Free Will Baptist denomination under which he was ordained and had pastored. Sandford's admonitions had a direct effect on A.J. Tomlinson's decision to formally remove himself from the Society of Friends in May 1898 (just weeks after his wife Mary Jane had removed herself, citing the issue of water baptism) and briefly consider Sandford's movement as his spiritual home. Sandford's Bible school would at first serve unofficially as an umbrella organization to Tomlinson and Mitchell's Christian school and orphanage in Culberson, North Carolina, but moreover it served as its model, in terms of holiness teachings, communal living arrangements, unquestioned top-down hierarchical leadership, and reliance on "faith" for finances, material provisions, and healing.

== Early ministry ==
As early as 1891 Tomlinson took an interest in "home missions" (a term referring to the intended evangelism of people within the borders of the US, as opposed to "foreign missions" which intended to evangelize people overseas). Holiness Quakers actively supported both home missions and foreign missions.

Following a series of holiness revivals in and around Westfield, Indiana between 1891 and 1892, in which the doctrine of entire sanctification was preached by evangelists including Jacob Baker, John Pennington, Emma Coffin and Esther G. Frame, Tomlinson prayed through to his own sanctification experience, which he relayed in his autobiography Answering The Call of God about twenty years after the experience:

It was about twelve o'clock in the day. I cried out in the bitterness of my soul: "Now! Now! You've got to give it up now! Now!" I felt him begin to weaken and quiver. I kept the "Sword" right in him and never let go. That sharp two-edged "Sword" was doing its deadly work. I did not pity him. I showed him no quarters. There we were at that altitude when all of a sudden there came from above, like a thunderbolt from the skies, a sensational power that ended the conflict, and there lay the "old man" dead at my feet, and I was free from his grasp. Thank God! I could get a good free breath once more. It was an awful struggle, but the victory was won. That was about twenty years ago, but it is fresh in my memory yet. I was indeed sanctified wholly."

After his sanctification experience, in 1893 A.J. Tomlinson joined the staff of the Chester Bible School, a Quaker Bible school similar to an adult Sunday School. Six months later he became the school's superintendent and treasurer. Within a year the weekly attendance doubled from thirty to sixty. Although never officially ordained as a preacher by any body of the Society of Friends, during this period Tomlinson had his first opportunity to preach, in a revival meeting at the school. In the absence of any older official ministers' willingness to lead, Tomlinson spontaneously stood to his feet and "after a few, stammering, broken utterances, the people would fall into the altar and get converted. The influence spread so that some were converted at home who had not been to the meeting."

In July 1899 Tomlinson and Mitchell, after visiting the area intermittently for five years, arrived in Culberson, North Carolina to establish a permanent mission. Their mission was financed in large measure from Tomlinson's inheritance from his father, who had died in the Spring of that year. In June 1901, Tomlinson and Mitchell began publishing a periodical, "Samson's Foxes" to inform the wider holiness community of their progress and needs.

== Legacy ==
=== Children ===
- Halcy Olive Tomlinson (1891–1920), died in childbirth. A.J. Tomlinson later reminisced about her death to his followers, saying "I can see myself at the grave of my own daughter, putting a flag there with a special ceremony in memory of her faithfulness." The planting of flags at places of particular historical significance was later made an official practice of the Church of God of Prophecy, under the auspices of their Church of Prophecy Marker Association.
- Homer Aubrey Tomlinson (1892–1968), was ordained as a bishop by his father in the Church of God (Cleveland, Tennessee) and pastored a Church of God church in Queens, New York. Following A.J. Tomlinson's split from the denomination, Homer Tomlinson followed him into what became the Church of God of Prophecy. In 1943 Homer Tomlinson formed his own splinter denomination, which he originally called the "Church of God World Headquarters", but is now known as the Church of God (Huntsville, Alabama) after being expelled from the Church of God of Prophecy by his brother, Milton, over a dispute over who would follow their father as General Overseer. More eccentric than his younger brother Milton, Homer Tomlinson ran for President of the United States several times under the Theocratic Party, which he founded, and conducted evangelistic crusades in several foreign countries. Homer Tomlinson published his father's diaries in a three volume set between 1949 and 1955, and had the originals deposited in the Library of Congress in Washington, D.C.
- Iris Marea Tomlinson (1895–1953)
- Milton Ambrose Tomlinson (1906–1995) took over as the second general overseer of the Church of God of Prophecy at the death of his father, a post at which he served until his own death. He oversaw the completion of the Fields of the Wood Bible Park in Cherokee County, North Carolina which his father A.J. Tomlinson had begun shortly before his death. M.A. Tomlinson continued his father's polity and practices and expanded the church's domestic and foreign presence.

=== Writings ===
- "The Last Great Conflict" (1913) White Wing Publishing House, Cleveland, TN.
- "Answering The Call of God" (n.d. ca. 1913) White Wing Publishing House, Cleveland, TN
- "Samson's Foxes" (Periodical)
- "The Church of God Evangel" (periodical)
- "The White Wing Messenger" (periodical)
- Manuscript diary in five volumes, Manuscript Division, Library of Congress, Washington, D.C.

=== Biographies ===
Besides the above-mentioned autobiography, Answering the Call of God, and his personal diaries, A.J. Tomlinson has been the subject of at least three full-length biographies, and is frequently mentioned in academic research in religious history in America as one of the pivotal figures in the early Pentecostal movement in America. His biographies include:

- Lillie Dugar (1964). A.J. Tomlinson. Cleveland, TN: White Wing Publishing House.
- Daniel D. Preston (1984). The Era of A.J. Tomlinson. Cleveland, TN: White Wing Publishing House.
- R.G. Robins (2004). A.J. Tomlinson: Plainfolk Modernist. Oxford University Press.

=== Religious impact ===
Under Tomlinson's leadership, the "Holiness Church at Camp Creek" became the Church of God (Cleveland, Tennessee), which now has an estimated seven million members worldwide, is the second largest Pentecostal denomination behind the Assemblies of God. After his impeachment, he founded what is now known as the Church of God of Prophecy, which itself estimates having a membership of over one million members worldwide. Other splinter groups, such as the Church of God (Huntsville, Alabama) fall generally within the "Church of God" movement that A.J. Tomlinson led. It was Tomlinson's hope that the Church of God (Cleveland, Tennessee) and the Church of God of Prophecy would get past their differences and reunite as one movement, but that has never happened. However, especially since 2004, the Church of God (Cleveland, Tennessee) and the Church of God of Prophecy now collaborate more closely.

A.J. Tomlinson is also significant, along with contemporaries including Charles Parham and William J. Seymour, as one of the central religious figures in the beginning of the Pentecostal movement in the United States. A.J. Tomlinson enthusiastically adopted Pentecostal teaching himself, and spread the Pentecostal message across the United States, especially in the Southeast, as well as on several Caribbean Islands.

One of the distinguishing features of A.J. Tomlinson's polity and practices as compared to those of other Pentecostal denominations such as the Assemblies of God, is the hierarchical structure of the church, with the General Assembly as the highest tribunal of the church globally, a General Overseer to oversee global church matters when the General Assembly is not in session, State and National Overseers appointed by the General Overseer, District Overseers appointed by State and National Overseers, and local pastors who are set over each church by the State Overseer, not chosen by the members of the congregation themselves. This hierarchical structure allowed Tomlinson to expand the church while maintaining unity of message and practices. However, his role as General Overseer with a lifetime appointment engendered some jealousy at the time, which contributed to the controversy over his impeachment. Subsequently, the Church of God (Cleveland, Tennessee) adopted limits on the terms of General Overseer.
