= Leon County Pleistocene coastal terraces =

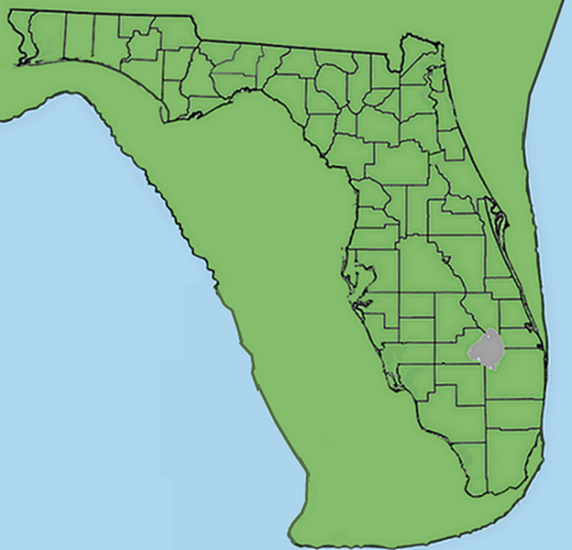
Pleistocene Florida during glacial advancement approximately 2.5 million years ago.

Leon County Pleistocene coastal terraces and shorelines were the geologic result of warming and cooling periods in what is now Leon County, Florida during the Pleistocene epoch.

== Overview ==
Repeated growth and retreat of the North American glacial sheet resulted in fluctuations of sea level over several thousand years. Florida submerged and emerged several times leaving behind established terraces assigned by mineral deposits and maximum sea level relative to the current mean sea level. These marine terraces and shorelines were named by various geologists, verified and mapped by the USGS. Each glacial retreat caused sea level to rise less than the previous warming event, giving an extremely accurate depiction of the appearance of Florida. Leon County was studied in detail by C. W. Hendry and C. Sproul in 1966.

== Hazelhurst ==
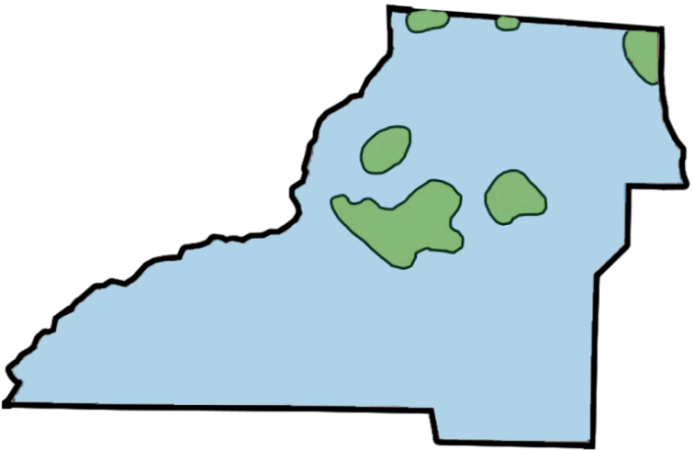
Map depicting Leon County and the Coharie terrace and shorelines of 6 islands.

The Hazelhurst terrace and shoreline (formerly the Brandywine) was assigned by C. W. Cooke and includes Vernon's Coastwise delta plain and MacNeil's high Pliocene terrace. Deposits are found between 97 and 65.5 meters (318 and 215 ft). During the interstadial period of late Pliocene to early Pleistocene epoch, the Hazelhurst terrace and shoreline was created in many counties east to west. Gadsden in particular had a very large land mass not only created by rising and lowering sea levels, but from depositions from the Apalachicola River on Gadsden's west side. Leon County remained completely submerged.

== Coharie ==
The Coharie terrace and shoreline was applied by C. W. Cook in 1931 and was named for the Great Coharie Creek, a tributary of the Black River in North Carolina. It is associated with a Pre-Illinoian interglacial and was the third rise in sea level during the Early Pleistocene glacial retreat and left behind dry land in the form of six distinct islands. The Coharie is defined by sediments at 65 to 52 meters (213 to 171 ft) above current mean sea level. In Florida the Coharie is included with the Sunderland terrace in USGS mapping.

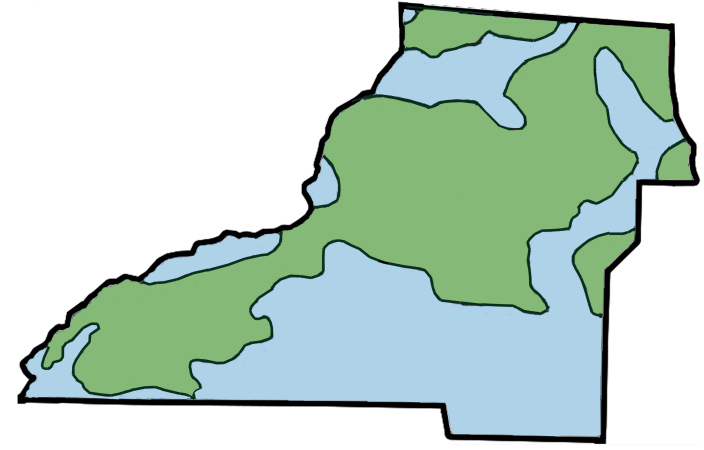
Leon County and the Okefenokee terrace and shoreline.

One ancient island appeared in the extreme northwest portion of the county near the junction of Meridian Road and County Road 12. The second island was located in the general vicinity of U.S. 319 and Sunnyhill Road just south of the Florida/Georgia border. The third of the northern islands of the Coharie was located in extreme northeast portion of the county and overlapping the county line between Leon and Jefferson County.

To the south lay 3 more islands. The first was located generally north and near Elinor Klapp-Phipps Park and surrounding area. The second and largest covered the area where most of Tallahassee is today. It extended from near Interstate 10 in the north to the capitol complex in the south, to just east of State Road 263. The third island was to the west and encompassed an area near Arvah Branch including I-10, U.S. 90, and north to Miccosukee Road.

== Okefenokee ==
The Okefenokee terrace and shoreline was assigned by MacNeil in 1950 and named after Okefenokee Swamp. It includes deposits of the Sunderland terrace assigned by Cooke. It is associated with a Pre-Illinoian interglacial (Yarmouthian) and was the third rise in sea level during the Early Pleistocene glacial retreat. The Okefenokee is defined by sediments at 52 to 30.5 meters (171 to 100 ft) above current mean sea level. The dry land mass left behind can best be described as an oddly shaped peninsula overlaying the islands of the Coharie as well as added land that is connected to adjacent peninsulas in other counties.

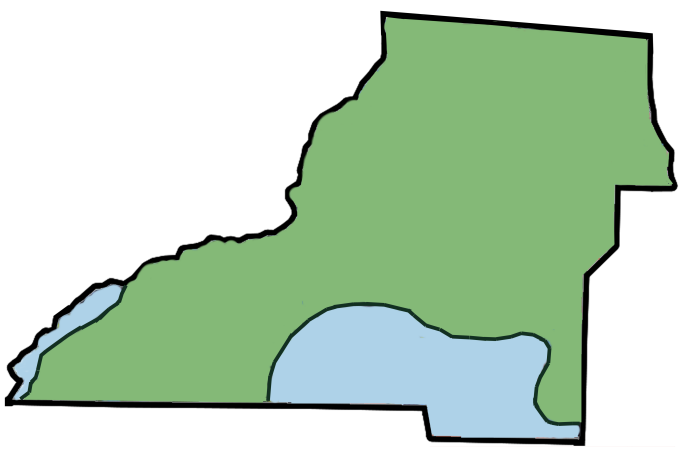
Map depicting Wicomico terrace and shoreline.

During the forming of the Okefenokee, the Ochlockonee River began to take shape as did rivers in other counties in Florida. The large inlet in the northeastern part of the county left the land capable of supporting a more recognizable Lake Iamonia. Eastern Leon had a large inlet reaching as far as the northeastern portion of the county. The Cody Scarp is the remnant of the Okefenokee. What would become Lake Lafayette is a Pleistocene river delta with the lake's eastern section accessing the sea.

== Wicomico ==
The Wicomico terrace and shoreline was assigned by Cooke and is named for the Wicomico River in St. Mary's County, Maryland and Charles County, Maryland. The Wicomico is associated with the Sangamonian Stage between 75,000 and 125,000 years ago. and was the fourth rise in sea level during the Early Pleistocene glacial retreat. The Wicomico is defined by sediments located at 30.5 to 21 meters (100 to 69 ft) above current mean sea level. The Wicomico is well developed in northeastern and extreme northwestern Florida. At this time the county is mostly dry except for the southern coastline. The Cody Scarp is a shoreline of the Wicomico as well as the aforementioned Okefenokee. The Ocklochonee River empties into a large, wide estuary or inlet leading to the sea. The ground for what will be the Tallahassee Regional Airport remains underwater.

== Penholoway ==
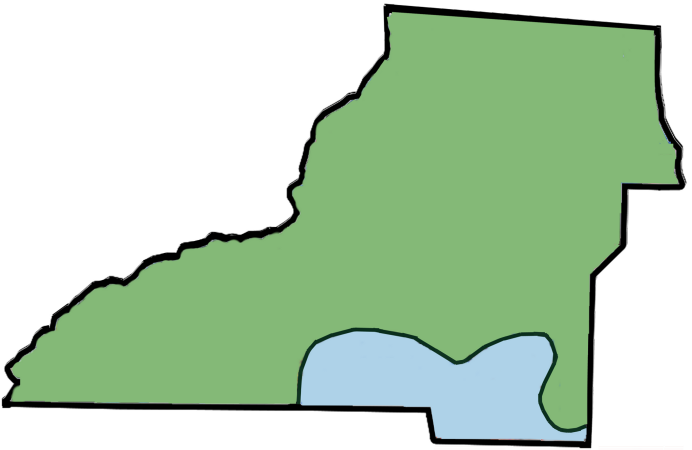
Leon County and the Penholoway terrace and coastline.

The Penholoway terrace and shoreline was assigned by Cooke and named after Penholoway Creek in Wayne County, Georgia and is associated with the Sangamonian Stage. The Penholoway is defined by sediments located at 21 to 13 meters (69 to 43 ft) above current mean sea level. The seaward boundary is generally better defined than the landward boundary. In Leon County, the Penholoway is a reduction of the Wicomico.

== Talbot ==
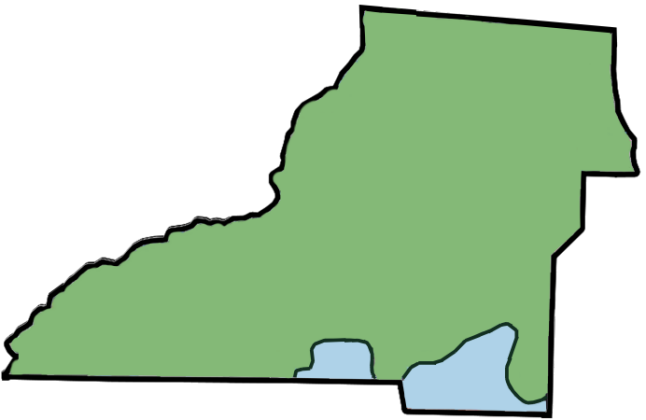
Map depicting Talbot terrace and shoreline.

The Talbot terrace and shoreline was assigned by Cooke and named for Talbot County, Maryland. The Talbot is associated with the Sangamonian Stage. The Talbot is defined by sediments located at 12 to 7.5 meters (39 to 25 ft) above current mean sea level. In Leon County the Talbot existed along the Leon/Wakulla County line. The Talbot is not well developed in Florida as it is in Maryland and other states. However, within Florida, the Talbot is better developed in Leon as well as Bay County, Wakulla, and Walton County.
