= Fire Baptized Holiness Church of God of the Americas =

US Pentecostal Christian denomination

- The Fire Baptized Holiness Church of God of the Americas logo
- Abbreviation: FBHC
- Classification: Protestant
- Orientation: Holiness Pentecostal
- Polity: Episcopal polity
- Senior Bishop: Bishop Patrick L. Frazier Jr.
- 2nd Episcopal Diocese: Bishop J.L. Davis
- 3rd Episcopal Diocese: Bishop A.L. Rodgers
- Headquarters: Greenville, South Carolina
- Founder: Benjamin Hardin Irwin and Bishop William Edward Fuller Sr.
- Origin: 1908; Greer, South Carolina
- Congregations: 216 in US (2010)
- Official website: https://www.thefbhchurch.com/

The Fire Baptized Holiness Church of God of the Americas is a Holiness Pentecostal Christian denomination based in the United States. Originating when the African American members of the integrated Fire-Baptized Holiness Church withdrew to form their own organization, the church was founded at Greer, South Carolina, in 1908. As such, though the Fire Baptized Holiness Church of God of the Americas is multiracial, it is predominantly African-American.

== History ==
The church was founded by Benjamin Hardin Irwin and Bishop William Edward Fuller Sr. (1875–1958). The Fire-Baptized Holiness Association originated in Iowa in 1895 under the leadership of Benjamin H. Irwin of Lincoln, Nebraska. Irwin expanded this into a national organization as the Fire-Baptized Holiness Church at Anderson, South Carolina, in August 1898. At age 23, William E. Fuller Sr., a member of the African-American New Hope Methodist Church, attended the founding of that body in 1898. Blacks and whites were admitted with equality. Fuller returned to New Hope from the 1898 meeting, resigned his offices, turned in his license, and cast his lot with the Fire-Baptized Holiness. After Irwin left the church in 1900, Joseph Hillery King became the general overseer. Fuller served as Assistant General Overseer to King in 1905.

Acting on what he thought was a trend toward segregation, Fuller led about 500 members to organize the Colored Fire Baptized Holiness Church in 1908 in Greer, South Carolina. The True Witness periodical was established in 1909. On June 8, 1926, the name Fire Baptized Holiness Church of God of the Americas was adopted.

The predominantly Anglo-American division of the Fire-Baptized Holiness Church merged with the Pentecostal Holiness Church on January 30, 1911, in Falcon, North Carolina, to form what is now known as the International Pentecostal Holiness Church, though prior to this in 1898, the Southeastern Kansas Fire Baptized Holiness Association separated from the denomination over differences in doctrine and is known today as the Bible Holiness Church.

== Structure and beliefs ==
The church government of the organization is episcopal. Bishops are the highest officials of the church, and preside over divisions called dioceses. The sacraments of the church are baptism and the Lord's Supper. Feet washing, matrimony, and funerals are considered ordinances. Women can be licensed and ordained to preach and serve as pastors.

The church headquarters and school are located in Greenville, South Carolina. In 2003, the Fire Baptized Holiness Church of God had about 160 congregations, mostly on the east coast of the United States, but also including one church each in Canada, England, the Virgin Islands, and 15 congregations in Jamaica. In 2010, there were 216 churches in the United States.

== See also ==
- Cross and flame
