= Mingo Swamp (South River tributary) =

Stream in North Carolina, USA

Mingo Swamp Tributary to South River
- Location of Mingo Swamp mouth Mingo Swamp (South River tributary) (the United States)

Location
- Country: United States
- State: North Carolina
- County: Cumberland; Harnett; Johnston; Sampson

Physical characteristics
- Source: divide between Mingo Swamp and Black Creek
  - location: about 2.5 miles northeast of Coats, North Carolina
  - coordinates: 35°25′44″N 078°36′35″W
  - elevation: 300 ft (91 m)
- Mouth: South River
  - location: about 1 mile northeast of Falcon, North Carolina
  - coordinates: 35°12′29″N 078°27′49″W
  - elevation: 121 ft (37 m)
- Length: 21.78 mi (35.05 km)
- Basin size: 79.19 square miles (205.1 km^{2})
- Discharge
  - location: South River
  - average: 83.44 cu ft/s (2.363 m^{3}/s) at mouth with South River

Basin features
- Progression: southeast then southwest
- River system: South River
- Tributaries
  - left: Mingo Creek; Big Juniper Run; Starlins Swamp
  - right: Stony Run
- Bridges: Denning Road, NC 27, US 301, I-95, Jonesboro Road, NC 55, US 421, N Spring Branch Road

Mingo Swamp is a 21.78 mi (35.05 km) long 4th order tributary to the South River in North Carolina, located in Cumberland, Harnett, Johnston, and Sampson counties. Mingo Swamp, along with the Black River, forms the South River.

== Course ==
Mingo Swamp rises about 2.5 miles northeast of Coats, North Carolina on the Black Creek divide on the Johnston-Harnett County line. Mingo Swamp begins flowing in a southwest direction, then flows southeast to meet the Black River and form the South River, approximately 1 mile northeast of Falcon, North Carolina.

== Watershed ==
Mingo Swamp drains 79.19 square miles (205.1 km^{2}) of area and receives about 48.1 in/year of precipitation.
