= Coharie =

Coharie may refer to:

- Coharie Formation
- Coharie Intra-tribal Council, Inc.
- Great Coharie Creek
