= Cross and flame =

Christian symbol

The cross and flame is a style of the Christian cross that is used by certain Christian denominations, especially those of the Methodist tradition and the Holiness Pentecostal tradition.

While the cross evokes the sacrifice of Jesus for mankind, the flame represents the Holy Spirit. In particular, the flame references Pentecost, when Christians "were unified by the power of the Holy Spirit and saw 'tongues, as of fire' (Acts 2:3)." The Holy Spirit plays a prominent role in the Methodist tradition, being the focus in distinctive doctrines such as assurance of faith (which is also known as "Witness of the Holy Spirit"), as well as entire sanctification (which is also known as "Baptism of the Holy Spirit"). John Wesley experienced assurance on Aldersgate Day when he said that his heart was "strangely warmed"; the flame in various Methodist logos additionally symbolizes this. A cross and flame have featured in the logos of many Methodist denominations, such as the United Methodist Church, Free Methodist Church, Congregational Methodist Church, Bethel Methodist Church, Evangelical Methodist Church, and Holiness Methodist Church among others.

In Holiness Pentecostalism, the role of the Holy Spirit is emphasized in the aforementioned Wesleyan doctrines of the assurance of faith and entire sanctification, as well as the Parhamian-Seymourian doctrine of a third work of grace, i.e. Spirit baptism evidenced by speaking in tongues. As such, the cross and flame features in the logos of certain Pentecostal denominations, such as the International Pentecostal Holiness Church, Fire Baptized Holiness Church of God of the Americas and the Church of God (Cleveland, Tennessee), among others.

== Methodism ==
=== United Methodist Church ===
United Methodist Church logo

In the United Methodist Church, a cross and flame logo was adopted shortly after the merger of the Methodist Church and the Evangelical United Brethren Church; the symbol relates the United Methodist church to God through Christ (cross) and the Holy Spirit (flame). The flame is a reminder of Pentecost when witnesses were unified by the power of the Holy Spirit and saw "tongues, as of fire" (Acts 2:3). The two tongues of a single flame represent the two works of grace taught in Methodism: the (1) New Birth and (2) entire sanctification; they may also be understood to represent the union of two denominations (the Methodist Church and the Evangelical United Brethren Church).

The United Methodist logo was registered as a trademark in 1971.

In September 2020, the North Texas Annual Conference voted 558-176 at its annual meeting to send legislation to the 2021 General Conference, the denomination's global decision-making body, to begin the process for changing the logo due to its association with the racist imagery of a burning cross.

=== Free Methodist Church ===
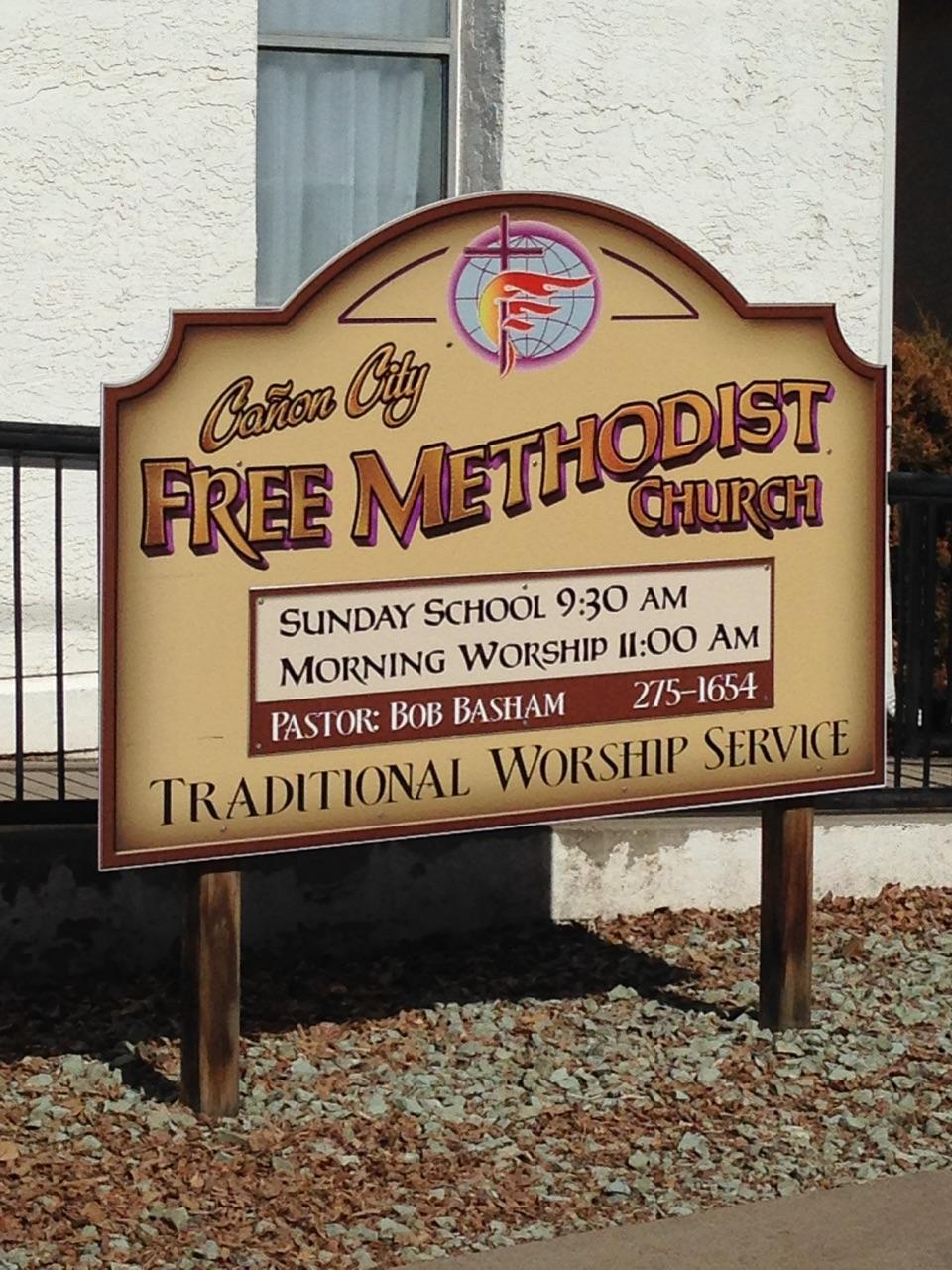
Free Methodist Church logo

In the Free Methodist Church, the cross and flame logo is used to symbolize the "Holy Spirit spreading across the entire world". The globe (on which the cross and flame are superimposed) alludes to John Wesley's dictum for Methodist believers: "The world is my parish" representing the missional purpose of the Church. This Free Methodist cross and flame logo was designed in 1985 by Les Rice, a graphic artist of the FMC Light and Life Press.

=== Holiness Methodist Church ===
The logo of the Lumber River Conference of the Holiness Methodist Church has a cross and flame, along with a dove.

== Pentecostalism ==
=== Fire-Baptized Holiness Church ===
The Fire Baptized Holiness Church of God of the Americas explains its logo, which contains the elements of the cross, the dove, and the flame:

The Cross

The cross represents the substitutionary, sacrificial, atoning death of Christ and His subsequent resurrection from the grave. Who is he who condemns? It is Christ who died, and furthermore is also risen, who is even at the right hand of God, who also makes intercession for us. (Romans 8:34) But God demonstrates His own love toward us, in that while we were still sinners, Christ died for us. (Romans 5:8). And if Christ is not risen, our faith is futile; you are still in your sins! (1 Cor 15:17) The Cross used in the logo of our church is the Cross of Triumph because Christ triumphed over sin and death to gain our salvation.

The Dove

The dove expresses innocence and purity. It also represents the Holy Spirit and the presence of God as hovering over the water at creation. The dove also hovered over Jesus at His baptism. ...And the Spirit of God was hovering over the face of the waters. (Gen. 1:2b) And the Holy Spirit descended in bodily form like a dove upon Him, and a voice came from heaven which said, "You are My beloved Son; in you I am well pleased." (Luke 3:22)

The Flame

Fire or flames are often used in the Bible to signify an appearance of God to man. The burning bush in Exodus is an Old Testament example. In Acts 2:3 . . . "tongues of fire" appeared on the heads of the disciples at Pentecost signifying the descent of the Holy Spirit. And the Angel of the Lord appeared to him in a flame of fire from the midst of a bush. So he looked, and behold the bush was burning with fire, but the bush was not consumed. (Exodus 3:2). Then there appeared to them divided tongues, as of fire, and one sat upon each of them. And they were all filled with the Holy Spirit and began to speak with other tongues, as the Spirit gave them utterance. (Acts 2:3,4) The fire represents the presence of God in the life of His people (the church) through the Holy Spirit. Fire lights up, warms up, purges, and purifies. It is the symbol of the uncompromising God. For our God is a consuming fire.

== See also ==
- Baptism by fire
