= Pentecostal Free Will Baptist Church =

Church group in the southern United States

- Classification: Protestant
- Orientation: Pentecostal; Baptist
- Theology: Holiness Pentecostal; Free Will Baptist
- Associations: Pentecostal/Charismatic Churches of North America
- Tertiary institutions: Heritage Bible College
- Official website: pfwb.org

The Pentecostal Free Will Baptist Church (PFWBC) is a Holiness Pentecostal denomination of Christianity with Free Will Baptist roots. The PFWBC is historically and theologically a combination of both denominational traditions, having begun as a small group of Free Will Baptist churches in North Carolina that accepted the teachings of Holiness movement, and later, accepting the teaching of a third work of grace spread by the Pentecostal revival.

== History ==
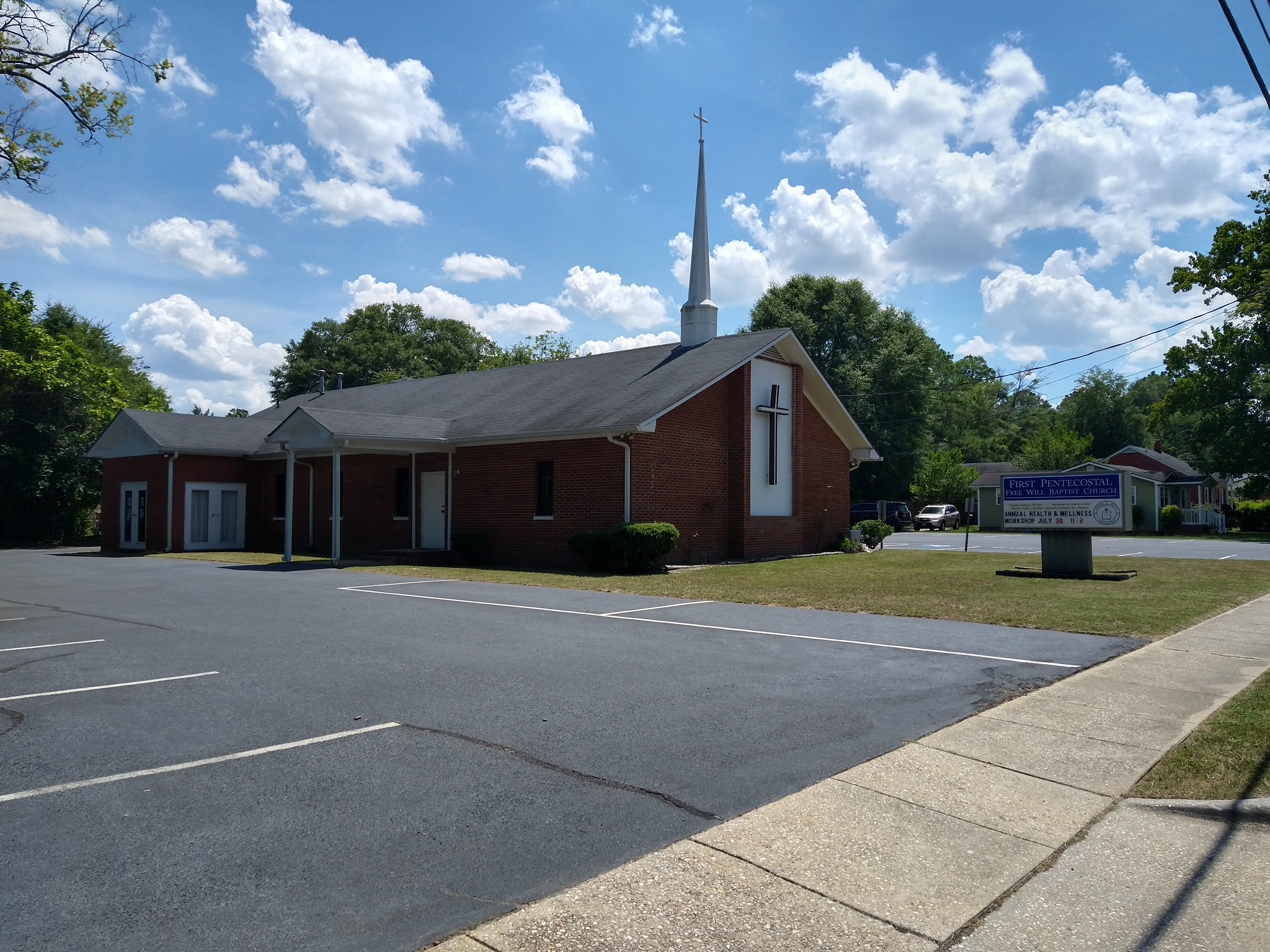
First Pentecostal Free Will Baptist Church, Fayetteville, North Carolina

Paul Palmer ministered in the Carolinas in the first half of the 18th century. He established a church in 1727 in Chowan, North Carolina. The southern branch of Free Will Baptists are largely the fruit of his labor. Many of these "Palmer" churches cooperated to form the National Association of Free Will Baptists in 1935.

Reverend G. B. Cashwell (1862–1916), a former minister of the Methodist Episcopal Church, South, returned to North Carolina after experiencing what he felt to be the baptism of the Holy Spirit in 1906 at the Azusa Street Revival. He began preaching "pentecost" to the Holiness denominations there, one of which was this small group of former Free Will Baptists. Through a series of meetings he held, beginning in 1906, this group accepted points of Pentecostal faith and practice. Cashwell's own group was the Pentecostal Holiness Church (now known as the International Pentecostal Holiness Church). The Pentecostal Free Will Baptist Church was formed from these groups in 1959.

== Doctrine ==
The doctrine is a mixture of Baptist (specifically, Free Will Baptist) and Pentecostal beliefs. Sanctification as a second work of grace, baptism of the Holy Ghost as evidenced by speaking in tongues, and the supernatural move of the Holy Spirit are important aspects of the Pentecostal Free Will Baptist denomination. A General Meeting is held biannually. Headquarters are in Dunn, North Carolina, where Heritage Bible College was started in 1971.

== Membership ==
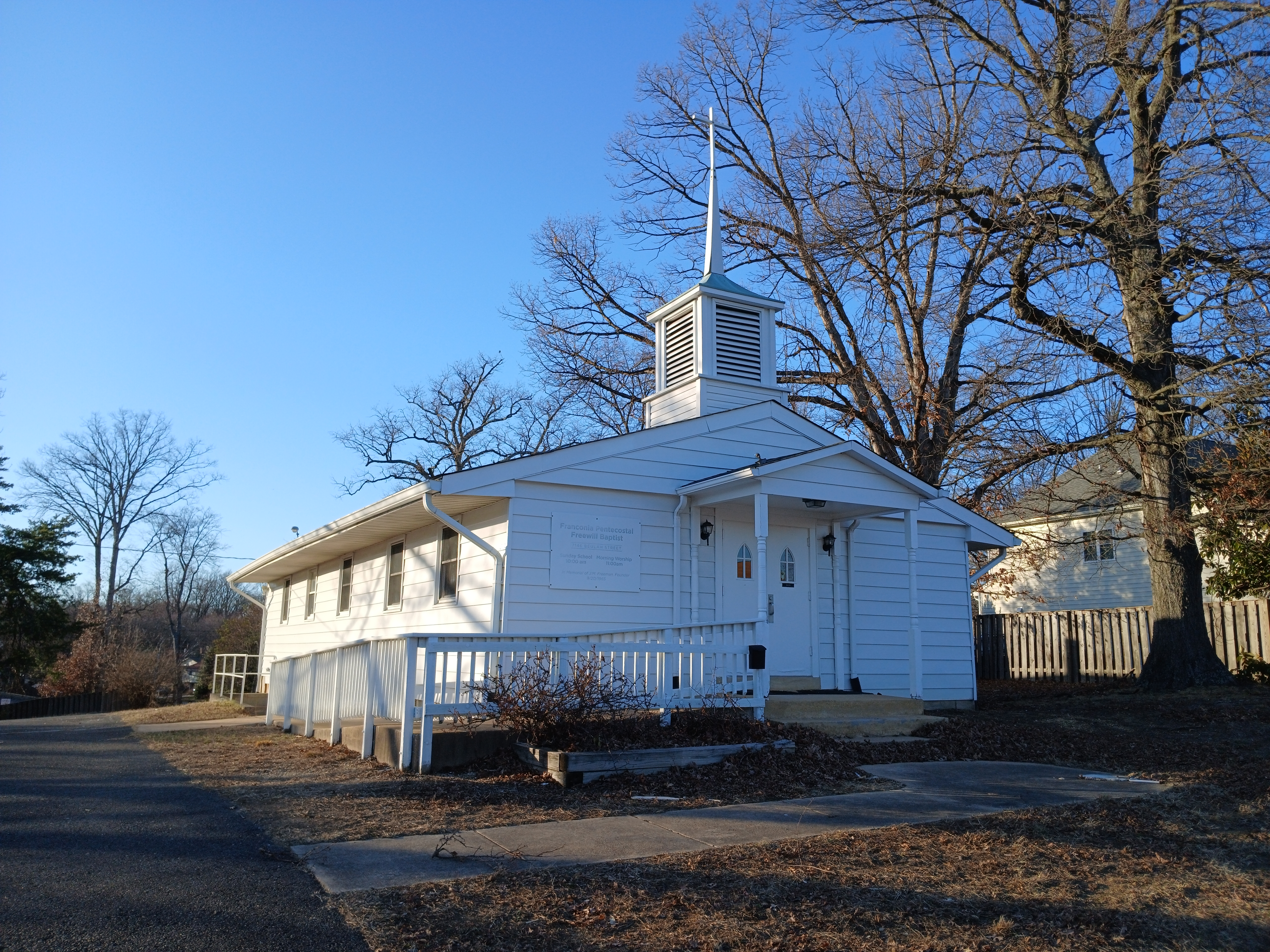
A Pentecostal Free Will Baptist Church in Franconia, Virginia, in March 2025

In 1998, the PFWBC had an estimated 28,000 members in 150 churches. In addition to the majority of churches in eastern North Carolina, there are also churches in Virginia, South Carolina and Florida, as well as overseas missions. Though the Pentecostal Free Will Baptist Church recognizes its Baptist heritage, its advance and choice of fellowship has been Pentecostal, shown, for example, by its membership in the Pentecostal/Charismatic Churches of North America (formerly the Pentecostal Fellowship of North America).

== Bible college ==
Heritage Bible College in Dunn, North Carolina is affiliated with the Pentecostal Free Will Baptist Church, though Holiness Pentecostals of other denominations also enroll there.

== Prominent members ==
- David R. Lewis, former Representative in the North Carolina House of Representatives

== See also ==
- Bapticostal movement

== Sources ==
- Encyclopedia of Religion in the South, Samuel S. Hill, editor
- Handbook of Denominations (11th Edition), by Frank S. Mead, Samuel S. Hill, and Craig D. Atwood
