= Six Run Creek =

Stream in North Carolina, USA

Six Run Creek Tributary to Black River
- Location of Six Run Creek mouth Six Run Creek (the United States)

Location
- Country: United States
- State: North Carolina
- County: Sampson

Physical characteristics
- Source: divide between Six Run Creek and Great Coharie Creek and Goshen Swamp
  - location: about 2 miles east of Hobbton, North Carolina
  - coordinates: 35°10′11″N 078°16′48″W
  - elevation: 180 ft (55 m)
- Mouth: Black River
  - location: about 3 miles southeast of Ingold, North Carolina
  - coordinates: 34°47′21″N 078°18′45″W
  - elevation: 36 ft (11 m)
- Length: 46.84 mi (75.38 km)
- Basin size: 274.23 square miles (710.3 km^{2})
- Discharge
  - location: Black River
  - average: 293.77 cu ft/s (8.319 m^{3}/s) at mouth with Black River

Basin features
- Progression: south then southwest
- River system: Black River
- Tributaries
  - left: Kings Branch; Mill Swamp; Tenmile Swamp; Turkey Creek; Mill Run; Stewarts Creek; Quewhiffle Creek; Robinson Mill Branch; Spearmans Mill Creek
  - right: Hoe Swamp; Gilmore Swamp; Beaverdam Swamp; Rowan Branch; Bull Branch; Crane Creek; Mathis Mill Branch; Gaddy Branch; Tarkill Branch
- Bridges: Casey Road, E Darden Road, Faison Highway, Pine Ridge Road, Old Warsaw Road, Turkey Highway, Rowan Road, Needmore Road, River Road, Taylors Bridge Highway, Moores Bridge Highway, W Magnolia-Lisbon Road

Six Run Creek is a tributary of the Black River, that is 46.84 mi (75.38 km) long, located in Sampson County, North Carolina.

It rises in northeastern Sampson County, approximately 15 miles (24 km) north of Clinton and flows generally south. In southern Sampson County, approximately 10 miles (16 km) south of Clinton, it joins Great Coharie Creek to form the Black River.

== Variant names ==
According to the Geographic Names Information System, it has also been known historically as:

- Six Runs Creek

== See also ==
- List of North Carolina rivers
