= Wesleyan Holiness Connection =

Interdenominational fellowship

- Founded: 2006
- Type: Wesleyan-Holiness & Holiness Pentecostal fellowship
- Headquarters: Glendora, California, US
- Region served: North America
- Members: 17 Christian denominations & 66 Christian universities
- Affiliations: Pentecostal/Charismatic Churches of North America
- Website: holinessandunity.org

The Wesleyan Holiness Connection, also known as the Wesleyan Holiness Consortium, is an interdenominational organization of denominations and congregations, with membership primarily including those aligned with the Wesleyan-Holiness movement or Holiness Pentecostalism. It seeks to promote Biblical holiness in churches that historically rooted in the evangelical movement initiated by John Wesley. The Wesleyan Holiness Consortium aims to guide efforts and projects focused on holiness in the 21st century for pastors, unity within and among the participating churches, a holiness voice to the broader church, and the importance of holiness in the future mission of the church.

== Member denominations ==
Denomination	Orientation
African Methodist Episcopal Church	Methodist (Mainline)
Assemblies of God	Finished Work Pentecostal
Brethren in Christ Church	Holiness-Anabaptist
Alliance World Fellowship	Keswickian
Church of God in Christ	Holiness Pentecostal
Church of God (Anderson, Indiana)	Holiness-Restorationist
Church of God (Cleveland, Tennessee)	Holiness-Pentecostal
Church of the Nazarene	Wesleyan-Holiness
Free Methodist Church	Methodist (Holiness)
Grace Communion International	Evangelical
International Pentecostal Holiness Church	Holiness Pentecostal
Shield of Faith	
Evangelical Church (ECNA)	Wesleyan-Holiness
Foursquare Church	Finished work Pentecostal
The Salvation Army	Wesleyan-Holiness
United Methodist Church	Methodist (Mainline)
Wesleyan Church	Methodist (Holiness)

== Other Associations ==
In addition to having 17 denominations as members, 66 Christian colleges and universities are affiliated with the WHC. Associated colleges represent a diverse portion of Christianity in North America, including the Quaker-affiliated George Fox University and the Trinity Western University founded by the Evangelical Free Church of America.

The Wesleyan Holiness Connection as a whole is a member of the Pentecostal/Charismatic Churches of North America (PCCNA).

== See also ==
- Global Wesleyan Alliance
- Christian Holiness Partnership
- Interchurch Holiness Convention
