= Gaston B. Cashwell =

American minister

Gaston Barnabas Cashwell (April 28, 1862 or 1860 – 1916) was an early Holiness Pentecostal leader in the southern United States. He was born in Sampson County, North Carolina. His importance lies in bringing several denominations aligned with the Wesleyan-Holiness movement into the Pentecostal camp.

== Biography ==
G. B. Cashwell first became a minister in the Methodist Episcopal Church, South, and later joined the Holiness Church of North Carolina in 1903. In November 1906, he traveled to Los Angeles to visit the Pentecostal revival at the Azusa Street mission. In early December, he had an experience that he believed to be the baptism in the Holy Spirit and the evidence of speaking in tongues. Upon returning to Dunn, North Carolina, on December 31, 1906, Cashwell preached the Pentecostal experience in the local Holiness church. Interest in the Pentecostal experience was so great that he rented a local tobacco warehouse and began a month-long crusade. A revival broke out in North Carolina, especially in the holiness movement. Most of the ministers of the Pentecostal Holiness Church, the Fire-Baptized Holiness Church and the Holiness Free Will Baptist Churches were swept into Pentecostalism by this revival. Over the next six months, he toured the south preaching Pentecost. His zeal and influence in spreading Pentecostalism through the south has earned him the title of the "Apostle of Pentecost to the South".

In the summer of 1907, Cashwell brought the message of Pentecost to evangelists H. G. Rodgers and M. M. Pinson, who carried the message to Alabama, Florida, Georgia, and Mississippi. Later they would lead these churches into the Assemblies of God. Through Rodgers and Pinson, A. J. Tomlinson of the Church of God in Cleveland, Tennessee, heard of Cashwell's message and invited him to Cleveland. On January 12, 1908, following a sermon by Cashwell, Tomlinson fell to the floor. He professed to receiving the baptism of the Holy Ghost and speaking in at least ten different languages.

In October 1907, Cashwell started a publication in Atlanta, Georgia, called The Bridegroom's Messenger. The periodical was created to spread the Pentecostal message over the country through a combination of sermons, articles, editorials, and testimonies. He edited it for seven months before turning it over to Elizabeth A. Sexton (who had been the Associate Editor since the second issue) and returned fully to his evangelistic efforts. The periodical was later taken over by Sexton's daughter and son-in-law, Hattie and Paul Barth, who organized the International Pentecostal Assemblies (now International Pentecostal Church of Christ).

Although the influence of Cashwell was strong, his time of association with the Pentecostal movement was for a brief period of three years—from his conversion in 1906 until his departure from the Pentecostal Holiness Church in 1909. In 1910 and afterward, his name no longer appeared in the roster of ministers belonging to the Pentecostal Holiness Church. Cashwell was instrumental in the development of the Pentecostal Free Will Baptists and was listed as a member of the Baptist church across the street from where he lived when he died.

Cashwell's apostleship of Pentecostalism in the south influenced many denominations. About a dozen existing Pentecostal bodies can trace their Pentecostal heritage directly or at least in part to Gaston B. Cashwell, including:

- Assemblies of God USA
- Church of God (Cleveland)
- Church of God of Prophecy
- Congregational Holiness Church
- International Pentecostal Church of Christ
- International Pentecostal Holiness Church
- Pentecostal Free Will Baptist Church
