= Falcon Tabernacle =

Historic church in North Carolina, United States

- U.S. National Register of Historic Places
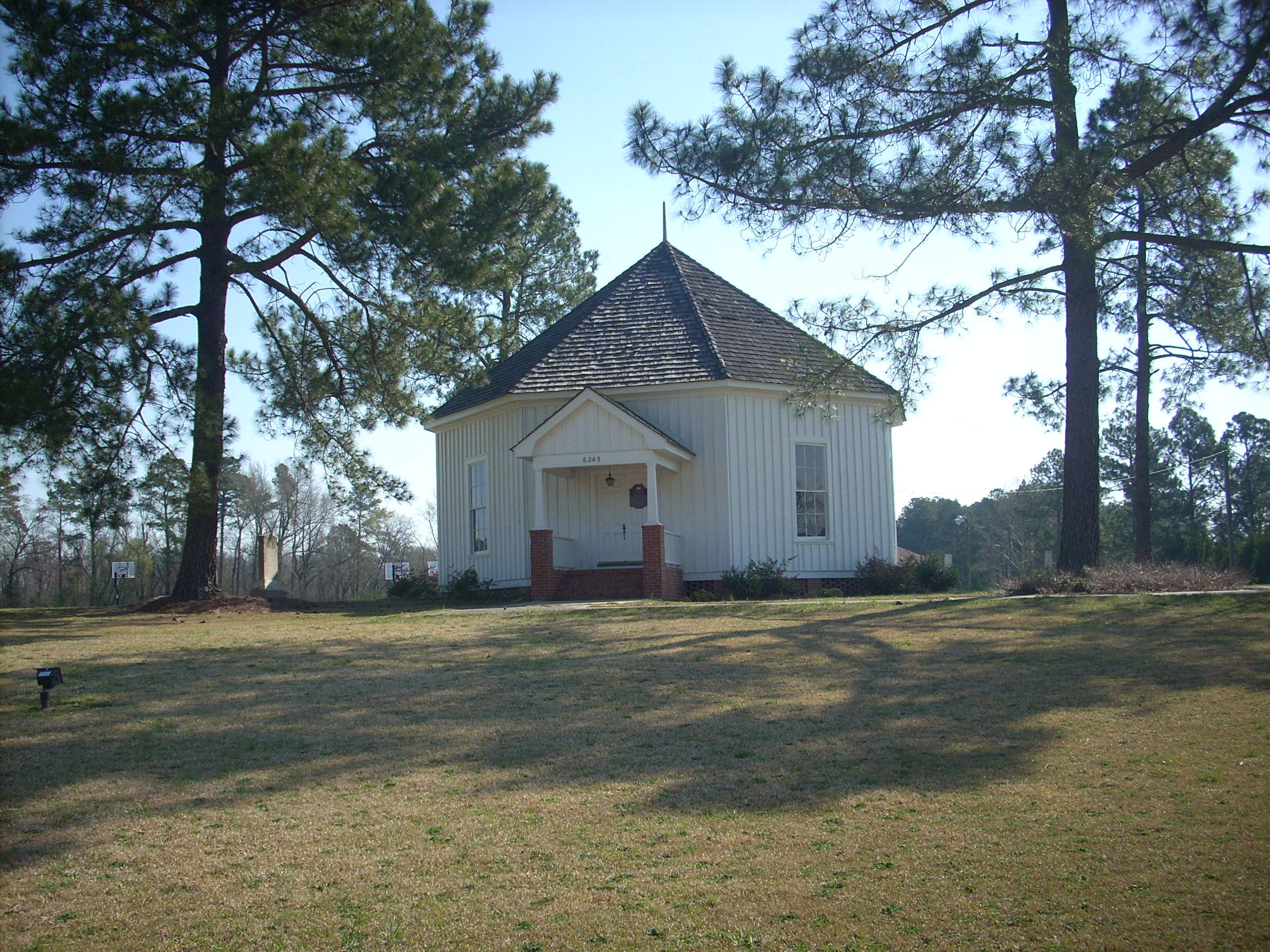
- The tabernacle

- Location within North Carolina Location within the United States
- Location: West Street, Falcon, North Carolina
- Coordinates: 35°11′37″N 78°38′52″W
- Built: 1898
- Architect: Julius A. Culbreth
- Architectural style: Octagon Mode
- NRHP reference No.: 83003814
- Added to NRHP: October 11, 1983

The Falcon Tabernacle, also known as the Octagon Tabernacle and the Little Tabernacle, is an historic octagon-shaped Pentecostal Holiness church building in Falcon, North Carolina. Built in 1898, it was designed by Julius A. Culbreth for prayer meetings and constructed from salvaged wood from trees that had been uprooted by a tornado. Culbreth, who was the founder of Falcon, chose the octagon shape because it reminded him of the tents used in revival meetings. In 1900 the building became the home of the Falcon Pentecostal Holiness Church, of which Culbreth was a leader.

On January 30, 1911, the building was the site of the formal merger agreement between two Pentecostal denominations, the Pentecostal Holiness Church of North Carolina and the much larger Fire-Baptized Holiness Church. The new denomination was called the Pentecostal Holiness Church and is now the International Pentecostal Holiness Church.

In 1952 a new much larger church was built in front of the Little Tabernacle and the congregation's name was changed to the Culbreth Memorial Pentecostal Holiness Church. In 1974 the Little Tabernacle was moved from its original location at 8443 Fayetteville Road to West Street, where it is now located.

On October 11, 1983, it was added to the National Register of Historic Places.
