= Cashwell =

Cashwell is a surname. Notable people with the surname include:

- Gaston B. Cashwell (1860 or 1862 – 1916), American minister
- Pamela Brewington Cashwell, American lawyer and politician
