= Pentecostal/Charismatic Churches of North America =

1994 successor to 1948 Pentecostal Fellowship of North America

- Founded: 1948
- Type: Pentecostal and Charismatic fellowship
- Headquarters: Los Angeles, California, U.S.
- Region served: North America
- Members: 48 Protestant denominations and associations
- Affiliations: Pentecostal World Fellowship
- Website: pccna.org

The Pentecostal/Charismatic Churches of North America (PCCNA), formerly known as the Pentecostal Fellowship of North America, is an interdenominational fellowship of Pentecostal and Charismatic churches and denominations in North America, existing for the purpose of promoting cooperation and understanding. It is a successor to the Pentecostal Fellowship of North America (PFNA). PCCNA headquarters are in Los Angeles, California.

== History ==
=== Pentecostal Fellowship of North America ===
The Pentecostal Fellowship of North America was formed by eight Pentecostal denominations in 1948 at Des Moines, Iowa. Before the Des Moines meeting, a rally was held in Washington, D.C., and plans for a constitution were formulated. Two of the leading figures of the Washington meeting were Bishop Joseph A. Synan and Oral Roberts.

The following were charter members of the PFNA:

- Assemblies of God USA
- Church of God (Cleveland)
- International Church of the Foursquare Gospel
- International Pentecostal Holiness Church
- Open Bible Standard Churches

=== Racial reconciliation and inclusion of charismatics ===
The Pentecostal/Charismatic Churches of North America was formed as part of a unification of charismatic and Pentecostal bodies and a movement toward racial reconciliation. Whereas the PFNA was formed to help bridge doctrinal divisions, the PCCNA set a broader goal of also the racial and cultural gaps. At a meeting in 1994 in Memphis, Tennessee, the Pentecostal Fellowship of North America was dissolved, and the Pentecostal/Charismatic Churches of North America was formed.

At this meeting, called the "Memphis Miracle" by participants, representatives of Pentecostal and charismatic denominations and churches came together to form the PCCNA, an interdenominational and racially inclusive partnership. The PCCNA was created to replace the Pentecostal Fellowship of North America (PFNA) which was formed in 1948 by white Pentecostal churches, but excluded black Pentecostal groups. The PCCNA was created to remedy the situation, and it was at the Memphis meeting that the PFNA and its members apologized to the black Pentecostal bodies.

We are gathered here in Memphis, Tennessee, to return to our roots and to recapture the initiative of the Spirit. This will be a time of repentance for the sins of the past. This will be a time of forgiveness as we rely upon the wonderful grace of our loving Heavenly Father and mirror that grace in our relationships with one another. The time has come for reconciliation! The time has come to recapture our heritage! We gather here as the children of God and heirs of the twentieth century Pentecostal/charismatic renewal of the church. Our Father has called us to unity.

— From an address of Bishop B. E. Underwood, Chairman of the PFNA, October 1994

== Purposes ==
1. To relate to one another as members of the body of Christ.
2. To demonstrate the essential unity of Spirit-filled believers in answer to the prayer of Jesus in John 17:21, “That they all may be one.”
3. To foster the evangelization of the world through the preaching of the gospel, with signs and wonders and the demonstration of the gifts of the Holy Spirit, by presenting Jesus Christ as the only Savior, Baptizer in the Holy Spirit, Healer, and Coming King. (Mark 16:10-20)
4. To promote and encourage the Pentecostal/Charismatic revival and renewal in North America and throughout the world.
5. To serve as a forum of spiritual unity, dialogue, and fellowship for all Pentecostal and Charismatic believers in North America, crossing all cultural and racial lines based on mutual equality, love, respect, and sound doctrine. (Acts 2:42)
6. To preserve mutual love and respect for each member group, maintaining “the unity of the Spirit in the bond of peace.” (Ephesians 4:1)

=== Recent dialogue ===
As of 2023, the PCCNA has been in ecumenical discussion with the United States Conference of Catholic Bishops (USCCB), as well as discussing the possibility of future theological dialogue between Pentecostalism and Catholicism.

In April of 2024, the PCCNA sent several delegates to the World Christian Forum in Ghana to represent Pentecostalism.

The PCCNA is also involved with the Somos Um (We are One) initiative in Brazil, which seeks to unite Brazilian Catholics, Evangelicals and Pentecostals.

== Members ==
With 48 denominations and associations as members, the PCCNA merges tens of millions of Christians in North America. Besides for Church networks and Denominations, the PCCNA also has the Wesleyan Holiness Connection, a separate association of 17 denominations, as a member. Several denominations are found in both associations and have dual membership. The below membership statistics are only for congregants in North America and are not indicative of total denominational or church network statistics.

List of church members
Denomination:	Membership:	Category:
Apostolic Church of Pentecost of Canada	24,000	Pentecostal
Assemblies of God USA	3,233,385	Pentecostal
Calvary Ministries, Inc., International		Charismatic
Canadian Assemblies of God		Pentecostal
Church of God (Cleveland, Tennessee)	1,074,047	Pentecostal
Church of God in Christ	3,800,000	Pentecostal
Church of God of the Apostolic Faith		Charismatic
Church of God Mountain Assembly	11,000	Pentecostal
Church of God of Prophecy	415,000	Pentecostal
Coastal Church		Charismatic
Congregational Holiness Church	25,000	Pentecostal
Deeper Christian Life Ministry		Pentecostal
Elim Fellowship	21,000	Charismatic
Empowered21		Charismatic
Faith Christian Fellowship International		Apostolic-Prophetic
The Fellowship Network		Charismatic
Fountain Gate Church		Charismatic
Foursquare Church	350,000	Pentecostal
Foursquare Church Canada	3,300	Pentecostal
Full Gospel Fellowship	432,632	Pentecostal
Grupo de Unidad Cristiana de Mexico AR		Charismatic
The Helper Connection		Church Network
Hilo Pentecostal Church		Pentecostal
Independent Assemblies of God International		Pentecostal
Independent Assemblies of God International (Canada)	24,000	Pentecostal
International Center for Spiritual Renewal		Charismatic
International Fellowship of Christian Assemblies	7,200	Pentecostal
International Pentecostal Church of Christ	4,961	Pentecostal
International Pentecostal Holiness Church	2,600,000	Pentecostal
National Hispanic Christian Leadership Conference		Charismatic
Open Bible Churches	150,000	Pentecostal
Open Bible Faith Fellowship		Charismatic
Pentecostal Assemblies of Canada	234,385	Pentecostal
Pentecostal Assemblies of Newfoundland		Pentecostal
Pentecostal Church of God	620,000	Pentecostal
Pentecostal Free Will Baptist Church	28,000	Pentecostal Baptist
Pentecostal Holiness Church of Canada		Pentecostal
United Evangelical Churches		Pentecostal
United Holy Church of America	50,000	Pentecostal
Rehoboth Pentecostal church of Delaware Valley - An Indian Malayalee Pentecostal Church		Charismatic
Wesleyan Holiness Connection		Interdenominational Fellowship

== See also ==
- Charismatic Christianity
  - Assemblies of God
  - Finished Work Pentecostalism
  - Holiness Pentecostalism
  - Third Wave of the Holy Spirit
- Christian ecumenism
  - Pentecostal World Conference (PWC)
  - World Evangelical Alliance (WEA)
- Decision theology
- Protestantism in the United States
  - Baptists in the United States
  - Evangelicalism in the United States
  - Pentecostalism in the United States
- Wesleyan theology
  - Holiness movement
