= South River (North Carolina) =

Stream in North Carolina, US

South River Tributary to Black River
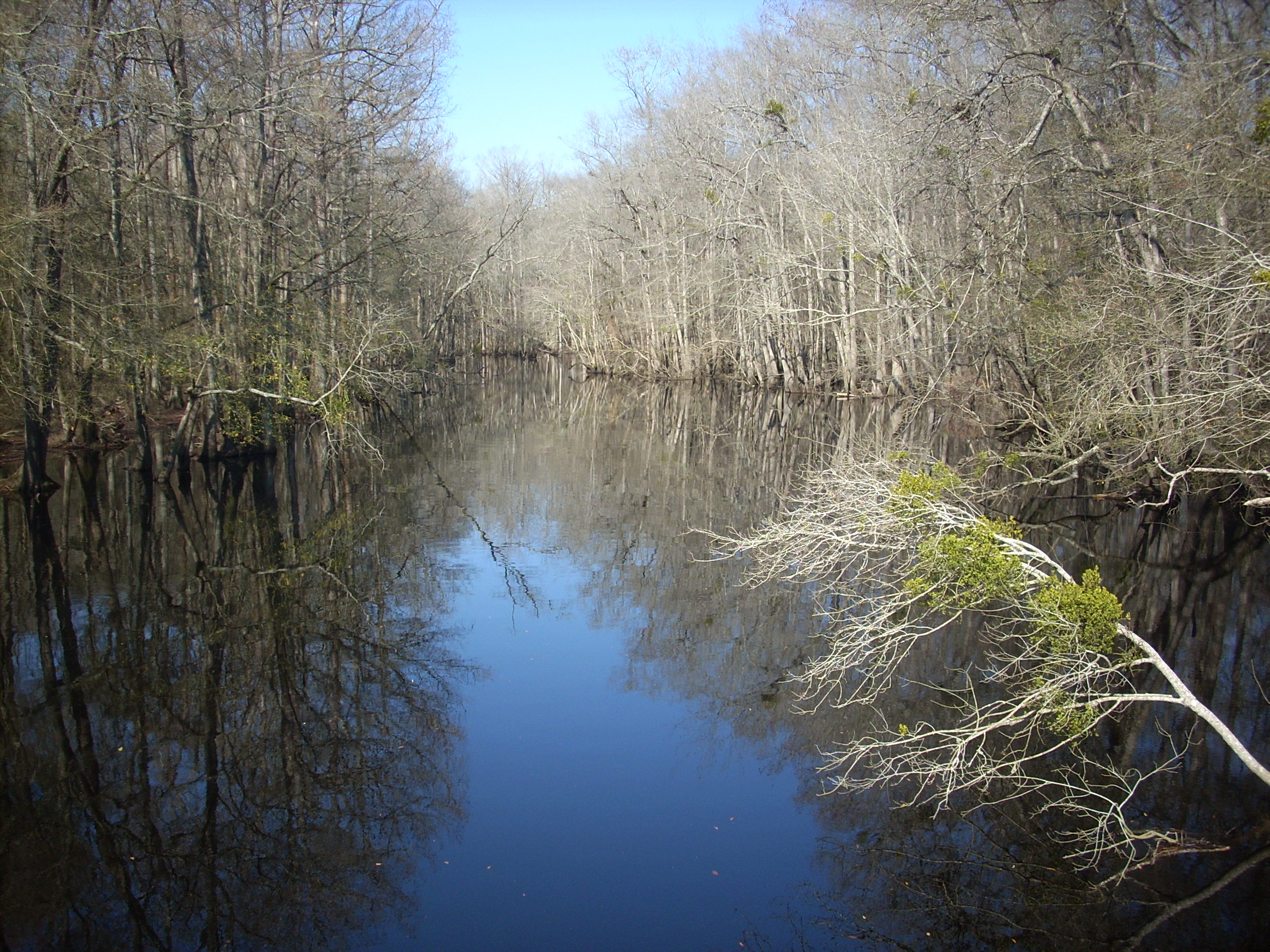
- The South River near Autryville, North Carolina

- Location of South River mouth South River (North Carolina) (the United States)

Location
- Country: United States
- State: North Carolina
- County: Bladen; Cumberland; Pender; Sampson

Physical characteristics
- Source: confluence of Mingo Swamp and Black River
  - location: about 1 mile northeast of Falcon, North Carolina
  - coordinates: 35°12′29″N 078°37′49″W
  - elevation: 118 ft (36 m)
- Mouth: Black River
  - location: about 0.25 miles downstream of Bakers Landing
  - coordinates: 34°35′00″N 078°16′10″W
  - elevation: 13 ft (4.0 m)
- Length: 78.47 mi (126.29 km)
- Basin size: 477.31 square miles (1,236.2 km^{2})
- Discharge
  - location: Black River
  - average: 549.68 cu ft/s (15.565 m^{3}/s) at mouth with Black River

Basin features
- Progression: generally southeast
- River system: Black River
- Tributaries
  - left: Williamson Swamp; Jones Swamp; Big Swamp; Castle Mill Creek; Jumping Run Creek; Tomahawk Creek; Enoch Mill Creek
  - right: Browns Swamp; Big Creek; Sandy Creek; Beaver Dam Creek; Peters Creek; Cypress Swamp; Long Branch; South Mill Pond Run; Lake Creek
- Bridges: Green Path Road, US 13, Hayes Mill Road, Maxwell Road, Faircloth Bridge Road, Autry Highway (NC 24), Clinton Road, S Gray Street, Butler Island Bridge Road, Elzabethtown Highway, Melvins Bridge Road, Greens Bridge Road, Helltown Road, US 701, Tomahawk Highway (NC 41), Wildcat Road

The South River is a tributary of the Black River, approximately 78.47 mi (126.29 km) long, in southeastern North Carolina in the United States.

It rises 2 miles northeast of Falcon, at the border of Sampson and Cumberland counties at the confluence of Mingo Swamp and the smaller Black River. The smaller Black River flows 30 miles from northeastern Harnett County, in Angier and approximately 25 mi (40 km) south of Raleigh. The smaller Black River flows south-southeast past Benson, then south-southwest, passing west of Dunn. East of Fayetteville, the South River turns south-southeast and joins the larger Black River near Ivanhoe approximately 30 mi (48 km) northwest of Wilmington.

The South River forms much of the western border of Sampson County, as well as the eastern borders of Bladen County and Cumberland County.

== Fishing ==
The South River is home to a wide variety of fish species, including largemouth bass, chain pickerel, various species of sunfish, longnose gar, and catfish. To navigate through the river, a kayak or a small johnboat is recommended.

== See also ==
- List of North Carolina rivers
