= Church of God of the Union Assembly =

The Church of God of the Union Assembly
- Company type: Church
- Headquarters: Dalton, Georgia, U.S.
- Area served: Northwest Georgia, Southern Tennessee (primarily)
- Website: www.cogua.com

The Church of God of the Union Assembly, previously known as The Union Assembly of the Church of God, is a Holiness church which was organized in 1920 in Walker County, Georgia, by dissidents from the Church of God Mountain Assembly. Its primary numerical strength appears to lie in the North Georgia and East Tennessee areas.

== History ==
The founder of the Church of God of the Union Assembly Inc. began his ministry right after the turn of the century. Reverend Charlie T. Pratt was ordained October 18, 1910 in Gold Bug, Kentucky and immediately his travels to different towns and then to different states.

The following year he traveled to Bartow County, Georgia, where he held a tent revival. A church was organized at Cass Station and they called him to be Overseer.

By 1915 Rev. Pratt traveled Kentucky, Tennessee and Georgia. On February 1, 1915, he established a church in Knoxville, Tennessee. On Christmas Day 1916, the churches that he had established met in a General Assembly at Knoxville, Tennessee. At that meeting, they agreed to come together on the doctrine of the church.

In November 1919, Rev. Pratt and seven other men applied for a church charter in Bartow County, Georgia. The charter was granted and Center, Georgia became the first headquarters for the Church of God of the Union Assembly. Members who were in active support of the Union Assembly of the Church of God from its beginning included; J.W "Wille" Burnett, Tom Bohannon, Joe Vaughn, Chad Jones, Alec Ledford, and T.R. Bell. This is from the original Charter and covenant

In 1922 the National Headquarters was moved to Dalton, Georgia, where it remains today. In October 1942 the Church was incorporated as a non-profit corporation under the Georgia Corporation Act of 1938.
