= Church of God Mountain Assembly =

Holiness Pentecostal Christian body

- Classification: Holiness Pentecostal
- Associations: Pentecostal/Charismatic Churches of North America
- Founder: J.H. Parks, Steve Bryant, and Andrew Silcox
- Origin: 1907; Whitley County, Kentucky
- Separations: Church of God of the Union Assembly
- Congregations: 720 total; 103 USA
- Members: 7,000; 11,000 attendees
- Official website: www.mycgma.com

The Church of God, Mountain Assembly (CGMA) is a Holiness Pentecostal Christian body formed in 1907, with roots in the late 19th-century American holiness movement and early 20th-century Pentecostal revival. The denomination maintains headquarters in Jellico, Tennessee and is a member of the Pentecostal/Charismatic Churches of North America (formerly the Pentecostal Fellowship of North America).

The main geographical strength of the body (about 65% of the churches) is in Kentucky, Ohio, and Tennessee. But, they are also in Florida, Georgia, North Carolina, Indiana, Montana, West Virginia, Alabama, Michigan, and Kansas. There were over 10,000 members in over 103 USA churches in 2018 and nearly 720 churches in 21 nations. The denomination's World Missions Department serves foreign nations with children's homes, schools, pastors, and churches.

== History ==
In the late nineteenth century, several ministers of the South Union Baptist Association of United Baptists embraced the holiness movement. At its annual session in 1905, the South Union Association of United Baptists excluded all ministers preaching entire sanctification and the danger of apostasy. On August 24, 1907, representatives met at Ryan's Creek church in Whitley County, Kentucky and formed a new association. They chose the name Church of God. The early leaders were Reverends J. H. Parks, Steve Bryant, and Allen Moses. Shortly after organization, they embraced Pentecostalism. After discovering that other bodies were holding property and transacting business under the name Church of God, this body added the words "Mountain Assembly" to "Church of God" for identification and legal purposes in 1911. In 1917 the body was incorporated, and in 1922 permanent headquarters were established in Jellico, Tennessee.

The Gospel Herald, official publication of the Church of God Mountain Assembly, was first published in 1942. A more episcopal form of government was adopted in 1944, that included the offices of General Overseer and General Secretary and Treasurer.

The Church of God Mountain Assembly has endured three divisions since its formation, resulting in the formation of the General Assembly Church of God (org. 1916 in McCreary County, Kentucky), Church of God of the Union Assembly (org. 1920 in Jackson County, Georgia) and the Church of God of the Original Mountain Assembly (org. 1946 at Williamsburg, Kentucky).

== Doctrine ==
The church utilizes a Church Covenant, and holds a twelve article Statement of Faith. Doctrines of the Church of God Mountain Assembly include:

- The Bible as the inspired, infallible Word of God
- God in three distinct persons – Father, Son and Holy Ghost
- The deity, virgin birth, sinless life, sacrificial atonement, and bodily resurrection of Jesus Christ
- Salvation by faith through regeneration by the Holy Ghost
- Sanctification as a second work of grace
- The full Gospel of the New Testament including divine healing and other gifts of the Spirit
- Water baptism by immersion, The Lord's Supper as Ordinances
- The pre-Millennial second coming of Christ
- In speaking with other tongues as the Spirit gives them utterance and that it is the initial evidence of the baptism of the Holy Ghost
- If you (yourself) identify or you currently have any children that identify as being LGBTQ+, you will be unable to become involved in the church beyond being a person who simply attends. Meaning you will NOT be permitted to engage in any church activities as a leader, mentor, ordained minister or any officially recognized role at the Church of God Mountain Assembly.

== Annual convention ==
CGMA's annual convention convenes at the end of July / beginning of August each year, while a camp meeting in Florida takes place in January.
