= International Pentecostal Church of Christ =

The International Pentecostal Church of Christ (or IPCC) is a Wesleyan/Pentecostal organization formed in 1976 by the merger of two Pentecostal organizations. In 1907, Gaston B. Cashwell, called the Apostle of Pentecost in the South, founded a periodical called The Bridegroom's Messenger, in Atlanta, Georgia. About the same time, Paul and Hattie Barth started a church. The Barths became editors of The Bridegroom's Messenger. In 1918, they began Beulah Heights Bible School in Atlanta, and in 1921 they organized an association that became the International Pentecostal Assemblies. John Stroup, a member of the Methodist Protestant Church, professed receiving the baptism of the Holy Ghost in 1908. Stroup was one of the first individuals to take the Pentecostal message into southern Ohio and parts of Kentucky. He organized the Pentecostal Church of Christ in Flatwoods, Kentucky in 1917. The body originally headquartered in Ashland, Kentucky, and later in London, Ohio. In 1976, the International Pentecostal Assemblies and the Pentecostal Church of Christ merged to become the International Pentecostal Church of Christ. Headquarters are located in London, Ohio. The church operates a youth camp, and the Global Missions Department, the National Youth Department and Women's Ministries. Doctrines are detailed in a 19-article Statement of Faith ranging from the inspiration of the Scriptures to tithes and offerings. The IPCC is one of a few Pentecostal and Evangelical denominations to elevate the issue of racism to their statement of faith. The church holds two ordinances - water baptism by immersion, and holy communion. The denomination has two practices that are encouraged within the local church - foot washing, and child dedication. The body is Trinitarian and, like many Pentecostal bodies, holds that speaking in tongues is the initial evidence of Baptism with the Holy Spirit. Its affiliations are with the Pentecostal/Charismatic Churches of North America, Pentecostal World Conference, a charter member of the National Association of Evangelicals, and the World Evangelical Fellowship. In 2003, the denomination had 4,961 members in 67 churches. Nearly half of its congregations are located in Ohio. The rest are concentrated primarily in Kentucky, Virginia, West Virginia, and North Carolina. By 2010, the IPCC had dropped to 3,756 members in 62 churches.
