= Congregational Holiness Church =

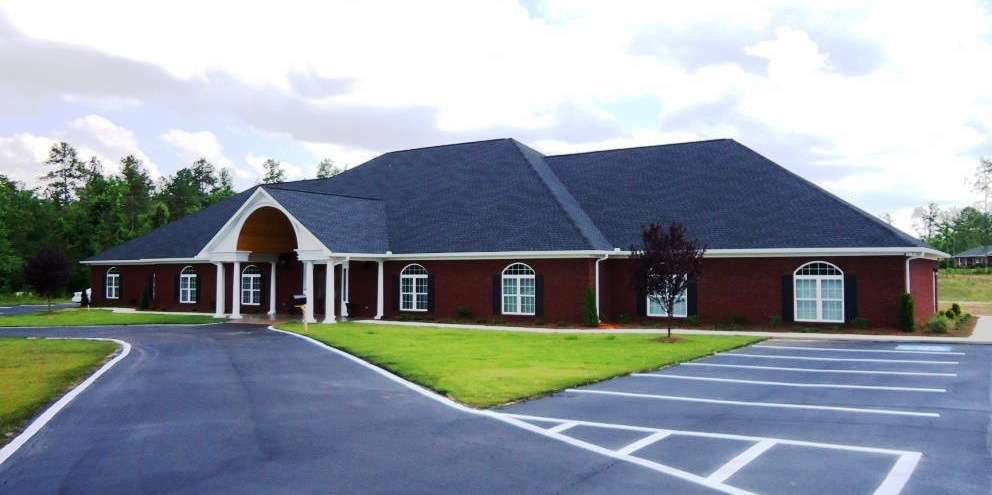
- Headquarters in Griffin, Georgia
- Classification: Protestant
- Orientation: Holiness Pentecostal
- Polity: Congregational
- General Superintendent: Scotty Poole
- World Missions Executive Director: Jonathan Fitzpatrick
- Mission USA Administrator: Rev. Anthony Baumann
- Associations: National Association of Evangelicals, Pentecostal/Charismatic Churches of North America, Pentecostal World Fellowship
- Origin: January 29, 1921; High Shoals, Georgia
- Separated from: International Pentecostal Holiness Church
- Congregations: 275
- Members: 25,000
- statistics for 2005

The Congregational Holiness Church is a Holiness Pentecostal Christian denomination that was formed in 1921.

== History ==
The Congregational Holiness Church shares the early history of the International Pentecostal Holiness Church, from which it withdrew. In 1920 a schism came into the Pentecostal Holiness Church over the relation of divine healing and the use of medicine. Some pastors believed Christians had the right to use medicine and doctors, while the majority of the church believed in trusting God for healing without the use of medicine and doctors. The minority withdrew and formed the Congregational Holiness Church. Led by Reverends Watson Sorrow and Hugh Bowling, a delegation from 12 churches met on January 29, 1921 at the church in High Shoals, Georgia to organize. The church was chartered in 1925 as the Southeastern Association of the Congregational Holiness Church and changed in 1965 to the Congregational Holiness Church, Inc..

The early leaders of the CHC attempted to democratize church government, preferring congregational rule over the Pentecostal Holiness Church's episcopal polity. In its beginning, the church had no officially elected leaders, and a General Conference was held every two years. In 1935, the structure of the denomination was changed. The church was divided into three districts, and in 1938 the office of General Superintendent was added. Foreign mission work began in the early 1950s.

=== Recent history ===
Offices are located in Griffin, Georgia. In addition to the United States, the Congregational Holiness Church has congregations in 34 countries including, but not limited to the following continents: Africa, Asia, North America, and South America. The Church now has eight districts: North Alabama, South Alabama, East Carolina, West Carolina, Central Georgia, North Georgia, Florida, Virginia, and a Hispanic Conference. USA Membership in 2013 was an estimated 29,000 in 275 churches. Partnership with the larger Pentecostal and evangelical communities is maintained through membership in the Pentecostal/Charismatic Churches of North America, the National Association of Evangelicals, and the Pentecostal World Fellowship.

== Beliefs ==
Those who organized the new church believed that, although divine healing was a part of Christ's atonement, God had given the gift of medicine to mankind as well. Otherwise, the faith and practice of the Congregational Holiness Church is quite similar to the parent body. Doctrine includes belief in the Trinity; the inspiration of the Scriptures; the Baptism of the Holy Ghost with the initial evidence of speaking in tongues; the Virgin Birth of Jesus Christ; the death, burial and resurrection of Christ; and His imminent, personal, premillennial second coming. They hold three church ordinances, water baptism, the Lord's supper, and feet washing, as well as the operation of nine gifts of the Spirit.

=== Articles of faith ===
- There is but One Living and True God, the Great Creator, and there are three persons in the Godhead. The Father, the Son, and the Holy Ghost. Genesis 1:1-27; Matthew 28:19; I John 5:7.
- We believe the Holy Bible to be the inspired Word of God. II Timothy 3:16; II Peter 1:20-21.
- We believe we are justified when we repent of our sins, and believe in Jesus Christ. Mark 1:15; Acts 13:38-39; Romans 5:1.
- We believe Sanctification to be a definite work of Grace, subsequent to Salvation. John 15:2; 17:16-17; Ephesians 5:25-27; I John 1:9.
- We believe in the baptism with the Holy Ghost, and speaking with other tongues, as the Spirit gives utterance to be the initiatory evidence of this experience. Acts 2:4; 10:44-46; 19:6.
- We believe in divine healing for the body. Acts 3:2-12; 9:32-43; 5:15-16; James 5:14. We do not condemn medical science.
- We believe every blessing we receive from God including Divine healing, comes through the merits of the atonement. Romans 5:11; James 1:16-17.
- We believe in the operation of the nine gifts of the Spirit and encourage our people to so live that these gifts may be manifested in their lives. I Corinthians 12:1-12.
- We believe in the imminent rapture of the church, and the personal, pre-millennial Second Coming of our Lord Jesus Christ. Acts 1:10-11; I Thessalonians 4:13-18; Revelation 1:7.
- We, as a church, believe in the eternal redemption of all saints who are faithful to the end. Matthew 24:13; Revelation 2:10. But we reject the theory of "Once in grace always in grace" regardless of conduct. I Corinthians 10:12; Galatians 5:4.
- We believe all who die out of Christ will be punished eternally, but those who die in Him shall share His glory forever. Daniel 12:2; Matthew 25:46; John 5:29; Jude 7.
- We believe the Bride of Christ is composed of the entire Spiritual Church. I Corinthians 12:25; II Corinthians 11:2; Galatians 3:28-29; Ephesians 4:16; 5:23-33; Revelation 19:7-8.
- We believe in the sacredness of marriage between one man and one woman. We promote commitment to strong family values. Ephesians 5:31-33; 6:1-4; Hebrews 13:4; Matthew 19:5; Leviticus 18:22; Genesis 2:24.
- We require all our ministers to speak the same thing, and that there be no division among us in doctrine concerning our Articles of Faith. I Corinthians 1:10.

== Structure ==
The CHC’s form of government is congregational. The highest governing body is the General Conference, which meets every four years. The General Conference elects the General Superintendent, which along with two Assistant General Superintendents, General Secretary, General Treasurer, and World Missions Superintendent. The following full-time officers, General Superintendent, World Missions Superintendent, and the appointed Mission USA Administrator, manage the day-to-day operations of the church. The nine districts elect five member presbyteries. The presbyters along with the general church officers form the General Committee. This committee handles the major business of the church between General Conferences.
