= Penholoway Creek =

Stream in Georgia, U.S.

Coordinates: 31°33′11.79″N 81°41′47.40″W

Penholoway Creek is a stream in the U.S. state of Georgia. It is a tributary to the Altamaha River.

== Name ==
Penholoway is a name derived from the Creek language meaning "high foot log".

Many variant names have been recorded, including:

- Fin Halloway Creek
- Finhalloway Creek
- Finholloway Creek
- Finholoway River
- Finn Halloway Creek
- Pen Holloway Creek
- Penholloway Creek
- Phaenehalloway Creek
- Phenholloway Creek
- Phennohaloway Creek
- Phin Holloway Creek
- Phin Holloway River
- Phinholloway Creek
- Phinhotoway Creek
- Pin Holloway Creek
- Pinholloway Creek
- Turkey Creek
- Turkie Creek
