= Falcon, North Carolina =

- Town
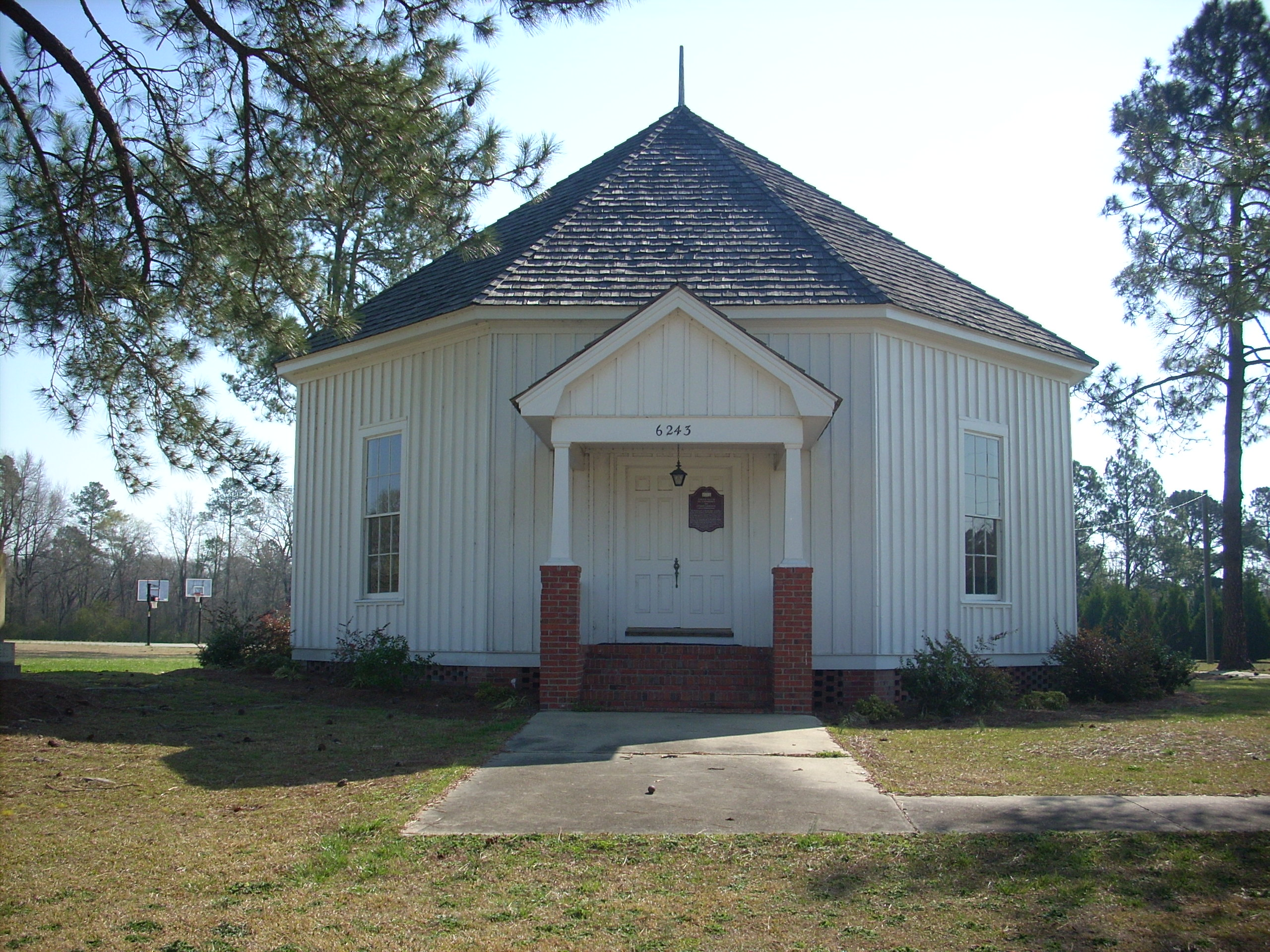
- Falcon Tabernacle

- Seal

- Location in Cumberland County and the state of North Carolina.
- Coordinates: 35°11′37″N 78°39′04″W
- Country: United States
- State: North Carolina
- Counties: Cumberland, Sampson

Government
  - Mayor: Clifton L. Turpin Jr.

Area
  - Total: 1.41 sq mi (3.66 km^{2})
  - Land: 1.41 sq mi (3.65 km^{2})
  - Water: 0.0039 sq mi (0.01 km^{2})
- Elevation: 148 ft (45 m)

Population (2020)
  - Total: 324
  - Density: 230.1/sq mi (88.83/km^{2})
- Time zone: UTC-5 (Eastern (EST))
  - Summer (DST): UTC-4 (EDT)
- ZIP code: 28342
- Area codes: 910, 472
- FIPS code: 37-22620
- GNIS feature ID: 2406485
- Website: https://town-of-falcon.com/

Falcon is a town in Cumberland and Sampson counties in the U.S. state of North Carolina. As of the 2020 census, Falcon had a population of 324.

== History ==
Falcon Tabernacle was listed on the National Register of Historic Places in 1983.

== Geography ==
Falcon is located in northeastern Cumberland County. A small portion of the town extends east into Sampson County. The town is situated on the west side of the South River, a tributary of the Black River and part of the Cape Fear River watershed.

North Carolina Highway 82 passes through the center of the town, leading northwest 1.5 miles (2.4 km) to Interstate 95 and south 3 miles (5 km) to U.S. Route 13. Via I-95, Fayetteville, the Cumberland County seat, is 18 miles (29 km) to the southwest.

According to the United States Census Bureau, the town has a total area of 1.2 square miles (3.1 km^{2}), of which 0.35 acres (1,397 m^{2}), or 0.04%, is water.

== Demographics ==
Historical population
Census	Pop.	Note	%±
1920	200		—
1930	279		39.5%
1940	206		−26.2%
1950	245		18.9%
1960	235		−4.1%
1970	357		51.9%
1980	339		−5.0%
1990	216		−36.3%
2000	328		51.9%
2010	258		−21.3%
2020	324		25.6%
2023 (est.)	381	▲	17.6%
U.S. Decennial Census

As of the census of 2000, there were 328 people, 84 households, and 58 families residing in the town. The population density was 262.4 inhabitants per square mile (101.3/km^{2}). There were 102 housing units at an average density of 81.6 units per square mile (31.5 units/km^{2}). The racial makeup of the town was 84.45% White, 9.45% African American, 0.61% Native American, 3.05% from other races, and 2.44% from two or more races. Hispanic or Latino of any race were 3.35% of the population.

There were 84 households, out of which 27.4% had children under the age of 18 living with them, 53.6% were married couples living together, 9.5% had a female householder with no husband present, and 29.8% were non-families. 22.6% of all households were made up of individuals, and 10.7% had someone living alone who was 65 years of age or older. The average household size was 2.50 and the average family size was 2.98.

In the town, the population was spread out, with 32.0% under the age of 18, 7.0% from 18 to 24, 20.1% from 25 to 44, 14.0% from 45 to 64, and 26.8% who were 65 years of age or older. The median age was 36 years. For every 100 females, there were 94.1 males. For every 100 females age 18 and over, there were 78.4 males.

The median income for a household in the town was $31,125, and the median income for a family was $38,500. Males had a median income of $28,750 versus $23,250 for females. The per capita income for the town was $10,387. About 3.3% of families and 17.6% of the population were below the poverty line, including none of those under age 18 and 7.1% of those age 65 or over.
