= Fire-Baptized Holiness Church =

The Fire-Baptized Holiness Church was a holiness Christian denomination that was based in North America. It was unique in that it taught three works of grace prior to the advent of Holiness Pentecostalism, though with a different doctrinal formulation; it continues today in the following denominations: International Pentecostal Holiness Church, Fire Baptized Holiness Church of God of the Americas, Pentecostal Fire-Baptized Holiness Church, Bible Holiness Church and Wesleyan Holiness Alliance.

The Fire-Baptized Holiness Church was founded in 1896, mainly from a Methodist background, with Benjamin Wesley Young and Benjamin Hardin Irwin serving as leaders, though some of the denomination's members had a Quaker or River Brethren background as well. Irwin, a Wesleyan Methodist elder taught belief in a third blessing, the baptism by fire (known in short as "the fire"). The Constitution and General Rules of the Fire Baptized Holiness Association taught three definite works of grace: (1) the New Birth, (2) entire sanctification (baptism with the Holy Ghost), and (3) baptism of fire.

The Southeastern Kansas Fire Baptized Holiness Association dissolved its relationship with the rest of the denomination in 1898 after Irwin began to preach the necessity of maintaining Jewish dietary laws; the Southeastern Kansas Fire Baptized Holiness Association renamed itself as the Fire Baptized Holiness Association of Southeastern Kansas in 1904 and then the Fire Baptized Holiness Church (Wesleyan) in 1945 and then the present-day name of Bible Holiness Church in 1995. This group dropped its belief in a third work of grace in 1948; its annual camp meeting is held in Independence, Kansas, which has been the location of it since 1933. In 1979, a schism regarding holiness standards occurred in the Fire Baptized Holiness Church (Wesleyan), resulting in the formation of the Wesleyan Holiness Alliance. Both the Bible Holiness Church and the Wesleyan Holiness Alliance are considered to be a part of the conservative holiness movement and teach two works of grace: (1) the New Birth and (2) entire sanctification (baptism with the Holy Ghost).

The bulk of the original Fire-Baptized Holiness Church went on to embrace Holiness Pentecostal doctrine, taking the line that the baptism of the Holy Spirit with initial evidence of speaking in tongues was the "baptism of fire" they had sought. In 1908, most of the African-American churches requested autonomy and amicably formed the Fire Baptized Holiness Church of God of the Americas, which teaches three works of grace in accordance with Holiness Pentecostal doctrine: New Birth, (2) entire sanctification, and (3) baptism of the Holy Ghost and Fire evidenced by speaking in tongues. Most of the original Fire-Baptized Holiness Church merged with the Pentecostal Holiness Church in 1911; the merged body evolved into the present International Pentecostal Holiness Church. It also teaches three works of grace. Before the merger, the Fire-Baptized Holiness Church was an interracial body. The Pentecostal Fire-Baptized Holiness Church emerged from this body in order to continue uphold the holiness standards of the original denomination.

== History ==
The church was founded in 1896 by Rev. Benjamin Hardin Irwin of Lincoln, Nebraska. Irwin was educated as a lawyer but entered ordained ministry after he was converted to a Baptist church. After contacting members of the Iowa Holiness Association, Irwin accepted holiness beliefs and claimed to experience entire sanctification in 1891. He was a student of the writings of John Wesley and John William Fletcher and eventually joined the Wesleyan Methodist Church.

Irwin became convinced that there was an experience beyond sanctification called the "baptism of fire", or in short, "the fire". After receiving this experience in October 1895, he began to preach this "third blessing" among holiness adherents in the Midwest, particularly among Wesleyan Methodists and Brethren in Christ, a River Brethren denomination. His services were highly emotional, with participants often getting the "jerks", shouting, speaking in tongues, and holy dancing and laughing. Thousands attended his meetings, and his teaching was circulated widely within the holiness movement, with its greatest strength in the Midwest and South. His message was largely rejected, however, and was denounced as a "third blessing heresy".

Because of opposition, Irwin formed an organization in 1895 called the Iowa Fire-Baptized Holiness Association at Olmitz, Iowa. As he traveled nationwide, Irwin established associations to promote his message. By the time these associations were organized into one denomination in 1898, there were churches in eight American states and two Canadian provinces. An organizational convention was held in Anderson, South Carolina, from July 28 to August 28, 1898. The constitution of the Iowa Fire Baptized Holiness Association was accepted by the Neosha Valley Holiness Association in 1897. It became the Southeastern Kansas Fire-Baptized Holiness Association. William E. Fuller, an African-American minister who had left the African Methodist Episcopal Church, was elected to the church's general board and became the overseer of the black churches. The church was fully integrated with Southern whites and blacks openly worshiping together despite stringent segregation laws. According to Synan, "All [(Pentecostal) statements for or against racial integration failed to obscure one important fact——the practical integration of poor whites and blacks in backwoods Pentecostal revival services" and this was "a type of race-mixing that has occurred in the South since before the Civil War." By 1900, Fuller had organized 50 black Fire-Baptized churches and a convention.

The Constitution and General Rules of the Fire Baptized Holiness Association taught three definite works of grace:

1. We believe that Jesus Christ shed his blood for the remission of sins that are past (Rom. 3:25), and for the regeneration of penitent sinners and for salvation from sin and from sinning (I. John 3:5-10, Eph. 2:1-10).
2. We believe, teach, and firmly maintain the scriptural doctrine of justification by faith alone, as taught by John Wesley and the early fathers of Methodism (Rom. 5:1).
3. We believe also that Jesus Christ shed His blood for the complete cleansing of the justified believer from all indwelling sin, and from its pollution subsequent to regeneration.
4. We believe also that entire sanctification destroys and eradicates inbred sin (Rom. 6:6, Heb. 13:12, I. John 1:7-9, I. Thes. 5:23, John 17:17, Acts 26:18).
5. We believe that entire sanctification is an instantaneous, definite, second work of grace obtainable by faith on the part of the fully consecrated believer.
6. We believe also that the baptism of the Holy Ghost is obtainable by a definite act of appropriating faith on the part of the fully cleansed believer (Acts 1:5, 2:1-4, 38, Luke 11:13; Acts 19:6).
7. We believe also that the baptism of fire is a definite, scriptural experience, obtainable by faith on the part of the Spirit-filled believer (Matt. 3:11, Luke 3:16, Rev. 15:2, Psa. 104:4, Acts 2:1-4, Heb. 12:29, Ezek. 1:4-14, 10:2-7, Isa. 33:14, 6:1-8).

With regard to the baptism with fire, the Fire-Baptized Holiness Church taught:

We do not believe that the baptism with fire is an experience independent of, or disassociated from, the Holy Ghost, but we do believe that the divine baptism of Jesus is two-fold. Christ's baptism is with the Holy Ghost and with fire. We believe that it is He, the divine Paraclete, abiding in the heart of the purified believer, who creates an intense longing for the experience of the baptism with fire, and, as the Executive of the Godhead, baptizes those in whom He dwells with the baptism with fire, and that none can receive the experience of the baptism with fire except those in whom the personal Holy Ghost already abides.

In 1900, Irwin confessed to "open and gross sin", which brought "great reproach" to the church. He resigned as general overseer and was replaced by Joseph H. King, a 31-year-old former Methodist from Georgia. The revelation of Irwin's failure greatly affected the church; several state associations collapsed.

The Southeastern Kansas Fire Baptized Holiness Association dissolved its relationship with the rest of the denomination in 1898 after Irwin began to preach the necessity of maintaining Jewish dietary laws; the Southeastern Kansas Fire Baptized Holiness Association renamed itself as the Fire Baptized Holiness Association of Southeastern Kansas in 1904 and then the Fire Baptized Holiness Church in 1945 and then the present-day name of Bible Holiness Church in 1995. The Bible Holiness Church dropped its belief in a third work of grace in 1948. In 1979, a schism regarding holiness standards occurred in the faction of the Fire Baptized Holiness Church that now calls itself the Bible Holiness Church, resulting in the formation of the Wesleyan Holiness Alliance.

By 1906, King led the majority of the original Fire Baptized Holiness Church into third-blessing Pentecostalism (Holiness Pentecostalism), taking the line that the baptism in the Holy Spirit with evidence of speaking in tongues had been the "baptism of fire" the church had been seeking. After 1908, the denomination split on racial lines when Fuller left, with the blessing of the white leadership, and started what would become the Fire Baptized Holiness Church of God of the Americas. In 1911, the church merged with the Pentecostal Holiness Church and took the latter organization's name even though the Fire-Baptized church was larger; it is called the International Pentecostal Holiness Church . The body resulting from the merger would be renamed the International Pentecostal Holiness Church in 1975.

== Theological distinctives ==
The church's beliefs were largely consistent with the Wesleyan-Holiness movement in Methodism; however, there were distinct doctrinal positions that made it unique. Irwin taught of a third blessing that came after salvation and entire sanctification called the "baptism of fire." While speaking in tongues was not unheard of among the Fire-Baptized Holiness, it was not understood as the initial evidence of Spirit baptism as Holiness Pentecostals teach. This idea was formulated by Charles Parham and only began to influence the Fire-Baptized Church as news of the Azusa Street Revival spread after 1906. By 1900, Irwin also taught there were additional "baptisms of fire" he called baptisms of "dynamite", "lyddite", and "oxidite". This "chemical jargon" never took root within the church and was abandoned by Irwin's successors.

Other doctrines held by Irwin were also rejected after his departure. He, like other holiness Christians, opposed women wearing "needless ornamentation". However, he also applied this prohibition to men, claiming that the wearing of neckties fell under the category of adornment and was sinful. He also said it was a sin to eat anything forbidden by the dietary laws of the Old Testament. As a result, the church was sometimes called "the no ties, no hog-meat people."

The belief in a third work of grace was rejected in 1948 by the faction of the Fire Baptized Holiness Church that now calls itself the Bible Holiness Church. The Bible Holiness Church is non-sacramental (reflective of its partial Quaker heritage) and its holiness standards include the prohibition of "alcohol, tobacco, drugs, secret societies, television, immodest clothing, and jewelry." The Bible Holiness Church teaches conscientious objection.

== Structure ==
At the First General Council in Anderson, South Carolina, the church was organized with authority centralized in the General Overseer who held office for life. The General Overseer appointed Ruling Elders to oversee the churches in each state, and he could also make pastoral appointments.

For several decades, there has continued to be a Pentecostal Fire Baptized Holiness Church, which teaches the three works of grace of Holiness Pentecostalism (1. New Birth, 2. Entire Sanctification, 3. Baptism of the Holy Ghost evidenced by speaking in tongues). There are churches in Alabama, Georgia, South Carolina, North Carolina and Virginia. The Pentecostal Fire-Baptized Holiness Church operates with a General Conference comprising five State Conferences (Alabama, Georgia, South Carolina, North Carolina, and Virginia). There is a General Moderator who serves two-year terms, while a State Moderator serves one-year terms, with both having term limits. There also are Assistants at both the General and State Conference Levels.

The faction of the Fire Baptized Holiness Church that now calls itself the Bible Holiness Church is headquartered in Independence, Kansas. It had forty-five congregations and eighty-three ministers in 2002. Its periodical, which has been in existence since 1934, is called The Flaming Sword. The Bible Holiness Church runs Independence Bible School and Troy Holiness School, established in 1948 and 1973, respectively. The Bible Holiness Church has missions in New Guinea. The denomination enjoins holiness standards for its members. Men belonging to the Bible Holiness Church, both preachers and laity, traditionally do not wear neckties as the denomination has viewed them as being adornment (1 Peter 3:3–7).
