= Great Coharie Creek (Black River tributary) =

Stream in North Carolina, USA

Great Coharie Creek Tributary to Black River
- Location of Great Coharie Creek mouth Great Coharie Creek (Black River tributary) (the United States)

Location
- Country: United States
- State: North Carolina
- County: Sampson

Physical characteristics
- Source: divide between Great Coharie Creek and Sevenmile Swamp
  - location: about 1 mile north of Timothy, North Carolina
  - coordinates: 35°14′31″N 078°27′42″W
  - elevation: 200 ft (61 m)
- Mouth: Black River
  - location: about 3 miles southeast of Ingold, North Carolina
  - coordinates: 34°47′23″N 078°18′45″W
  - elevation: 36 ft (11 m)
- Length: 48.88 mi (78.66 km)
- Basin size: 379.27 square miles (982.3 km^{2})
- Discharge
  - location: Black River
  - average: 406.60 cu ft/s (11.514 m^{3}/s) at mouth with Black River

Basin features
- Progression: generally south
- River system: Black River
- Tributaries
  - left: Beaverdam Swamp; Kill Swamp; Ward Swamp; Beaverdam Swamp; Meetinghouse Branch; Williams Old Mill Branch; Rocky Marsh Creek; Mill Creek
  - right: Sevenmile Swamp; Merkle Swamp; Old Mill Swamp; Marsh Swamp; White Oak Swamp; Turkey Branch; Little Coharie Creek; Bills Swamp; Turtle Branch
- Waterbodies: Warrens Pond
- Bridges: Easy Street, Oak Grove Church Road, Old Crow Road, Warren Mill Road, US 13, McLamb Road, Rosin Hill Road, Roanoke Road, Keener Road, US 421, Five Bridge Road, Roseboro Highway (NC 24), Boykin Bridge Road, Ebenezer Forest Road, Wright Bridge Road, US 701, Lisbon Bridge Road

Great Coharie Creek is a 48.88 mi (78.66 km) long 5th order tributary to the Black River in Sampson County, North Carolina.

== Variant names ==
According to the Geographic Names Information System, it has also been known historically as Cohary Swamp.

== Course ==
Great Coharie Creek rises on the Sevenmile Creek divide in northern Sampson County and then flows south to form the Black River with Six Runs Creek (Six Run Creek) about 3 miles southeast of Ingold.

== Watershed ==
Great Coharie Creek drains 379.27 square miles (982.3 km^{2}) of area, receives about 49.0 in/year of precipitation, has a topographic wetness index of 571.73 and is about 14% forested.

== See also ==
- List of North Carolina rivers
