= Black River (North Carolina) =

River in North Carolina, United States

Black River Tributary to Cape Fear River
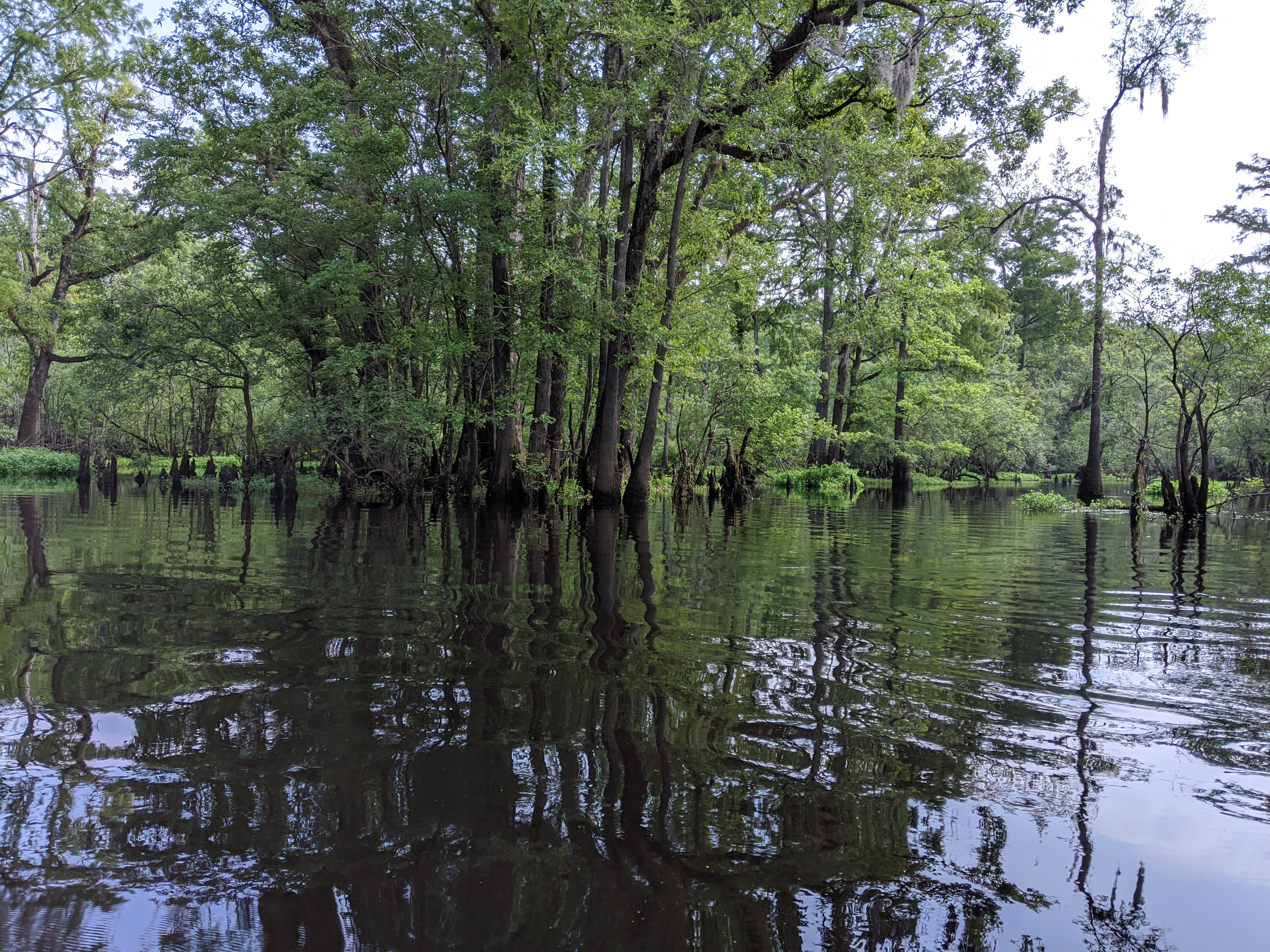

- Location of Black River mouth

Location
- Country: United States
- State: North Carolina
- Counties: Bladen; Pender; Sampson

Physical characteristics
- Source: confluence of Six Runs Creek and Great Coharie Creek
  - location: about 3 NW of Clear Run, North Carolina
  - coordinates: 34°47′23″N 078°18′45″W
  - elevation: 44 ft (13 m)
- Mouth: Cape Fear River
  - location: Wilmington, North Carolina
  - coordinates: 34°19′55″N 078°01′57″W
  - elevation: 0 ft (0 m)
- Length: 53.1 mi (85.5 km)
- Basin size: 1,417.37 square miles (3,671.0 km^{2})
- Discharge
  - location: Wilmington, North Carolina
  - average: 1,609.9 cu ft/s (45.59 m^{3}/s) at mouth with Cape Fear River

Basin features
- Progression: Cape Fear River → Atlantic Ocean
- River system: Cape Fear River
- Tributaries
  - left: Six Runs Creek; Clear Run; Big Run; Canty Mill Creek; Wildcat Creek; Kings Branch; Haw Mill Creek; Colvins Creek; Moores Creek; Bear Branch; Cane Creek; Cross Way Creek; Machine Creek
  - right: Great Coharie Creek; Devane Branch; Keith Branch; South River; Rowan Creek; Colly Creek; Lyon Creek; Line Creek

Distinctive structures known as "cypress knees" found surrounding ancient bald cypress trees in the Three Sisters swamp. Cypress knees form above the roots of cypress trees, and are believed to be a type of aerial root.

The Black River is a 50 mi (80 km) long tributary of the Cape Fear River located in southeastern North Carolina in the United States.

It is formed in southern Sampson County, approximately 15 mi (24 km) south of Clinton, by confluence of two creeks: Great Coharie Creek and Six Runs Creek. It flows south-southeast (SSE), receiving the South River approximately 30 mi (48 km) south of Clinton. It then flows southeast through Pender County, past the Moores Creek National Battlefield, and joins the Cape Fear approximately 10 mi (16 km) northwest of Wilmington, near the broadening of the Cape Fear into a tidal estuary.

The river is known for having a wide variety of fish species, ranging from several types of sunfish and catfish, as well as largemouth bass. In 2019, ancient bald cypress trees in excess of 2600 years old were discovered along the river. This discovery prompted excitement among scientists and media, highlighting the trees as some of the oldest living in the world.

== History ==
Long before settlers were navigating the Black River corridor in the eighteenth century, Native Americans traveled through these waterways via canoes. By the nineteenth century following the Civil War, the U.S. Army Corps of Engineers helped dredge the river in preparation for steamboats to have access to it. This would allow materials and goods such as lumber, grains, and livestock to be more easily transported by boat through the Black River.

== Geography ==
=== Three Sisters ===
Despite only being approximately 1 mile long and 1/2 mile wide, the Three Sisters swamp is home to the largest cluster of ancient cypress trees in the entire Black River Preserve. It is located in Bladen County off the State Road 1550 bridge and the N.C. 53 bridge (34°33'59.2"N 78°15'14.7"W) and is only accessible by canoe or kayak.

== Ecology ==
The Black River is part of a blackwater system which is nutrient-poor and more acidic than other types of freshwater ecosystems. The higher acidity is a result of vegetation decay and the subsequent release of tannins in the water. This makes for an environment that does not sustain most hardwood tree species and even slows the growth of bald cypress. Although its blackwater prevents certain organisms from flourishing in the Black River Preserve, these types of ecosystems often consist of a unique variety of fauna and flora.

Within the Black River lives a rare species of fish called the Santee chub (Cyprinella zanema). Another rare fish is the Broadtail Madtom. Although both of these species are uncommon, their current status is neither endangered nor threatened.

== Ancient bald cypress ==
The Black River in North Carolina is the only location in the world where bald cypress (Taxodium distichum) have existed for over a millennium. In 2019, an individual tree—dating back to 605 B.C.E—was discovered alongside this southeastern tributary. Ancient bald cypresses were determined to be the oldest trees in eastern North America, as well as the fifth oldest species of tree on Earth.

In order to determine the age of bald cypress trees on the Black River Preserve, scientists have used a non-destructive method combining radiocarbon dating and dendrochronology. An individual by the name of David Stahle, was one of those who used the technology to date some of the oldest standing cypresses located in the area of Three Sisters swamp. This technology provides important information regarding the adaptability of the Black River ecosystem through historical variations in climate and rainfall patterns.

== Recreation ==
In 1994, the Black River was deemed an Outstanding Water Source by the North Carolina Division of Parks and Recreation. It has since become a popular location for low-impact, nature-based recreational activities such as kayaking and canoeing. Year round, boaters can observe a wide variety of plant and animal species along the riverbanks.

The area is also used for camping, with some primitive campsites located directly on the riverbanks. It continues to be a significant site for interpreting and preserving natural and historical resources.

== Conservation ==
When it comes to conservation, The Nature Conservancy (TNC) is the longest running supporter of the Black River. TNC is largely responsible for establishing more than 17,000 acres for the Black River Preserve. With the help of North Carolina state agencies, this conservation and restoration project began in 1989 and has since protected the river and its surrounding environment.

North Carolina Wildlife Federation (NCWF) is another organization that campaigns to raise awareness and funds for the fragile natural habitats along the river. In addition to campaigning, they organize recreational events, such as guided paddles, to foster community involvement in the area.

The Black River is an area of focus for environmentalists due to threats on the ecosystem posed by humans. These threats include pollution of the river and surrounding waterways, as well as the logging industry, climate change and rise in sea level.

== See also ==
- List of North Carolina rivers
