= International Pentecostal Holiness Church =

Pentecostal denomination

- Classification: Protestant
- Orientation: Pentecostal
- Theology: Holiness Pentecostal
- Polity: Connectionalism
- Leader: Bishop J. Talmadge Gardner
- Associations: National Association of Evangelicals, Pentecostal/Charismatic Churches of North America, Pentecostal World Conference, Christian Churches Together, World Pentecostal Holiness Fellowship
- Region: Worldwide: divided into 28 regional conferences
- Founder: Abner Blackmon Crumpler, Benjamin H. Irwin
- Origin: January 30, 1911; Falcon, North Carolina
- Merger of: Fire-Baptized Holiness Church and Pentecostal Holiness Church (1911), Tabernacle Pentecostal Church (1915)
- Separations: Pentecostal Fire-Baptized Holiness Church (1918), Congregational Holiness Church (1920)
- Congregations: 16,690
- Members: 2,000,000
- Official website: www.iphc.org
- Statistics for 2012

The International Pentecostal Holiness Church (IPHC) or simply Pentecostal Holiness Church (PHC) is an international Holiness Pentecostal Christian denomination founded in 1911 with the merger of two older denominations. Historically centered in the Southeastern United States, particularly the Carolinas and Georgia, the Pentecostal Holiness Church now has an international presence. In 2023, the denomination released a report showing 1,691,750 members outside the United States, Canada and Brazil. Worldwide figures are estimated at around 2 million members. There are currently over 161,000 members in 1,602 churches in the United States.

Heavily influenced by two major American revival movements—the holiness movement of the late 19th century and the Pentecostal revival of the early 20th century—the church's theological roots derive from John Wesley's teachings on sanctification.

== History ==
=== Origins ===
While certain elements in the Methodist Episcopal Church, South supported the holiness movement in the church, others did not favor it, which led to controversy in 1894. Within a decade about 25 new Holiness Methodist groups, including the Pentecostal Holiness Church, came into existence.

==== Fire-Baptized Holiness ====
The oldest group that is part of the foundation of the Pentecostal Holiness Church originated in 1895 as the Fire-Baptized Holiness Association in Olmitz, Iowa. The leader, Benjamin H. Irwin of Lincoln, Nebraska, a former Baptist preacher, organized the body into the national Fire-Baptized Holiness Church at Anderson, South Carolina, in August 1898. By this time, Irwin's group had organized churches in eight U. S. states and two Canadian provinces. In 1898, the Southeastern Kansas Fire Baptized Holiness Association dissolved its relationship with the rest of the denomination over differences in doctrine (chiefly the rejection of a third work of grace) and this faction is known today as the Bible Holiness Church.

==== Pentecostal Holiness of North Carolina ====
The first congregation to carry the name Pentecostal Holiness Church was formed in Goldsboro, North Carolina in 1898. This church was founded as a result of the evangelistic ministry of Abner Blackmon Crumpler, a Methodist evangelist. A year earlier, Crumpler had founded the inter-denominational North Carolina Holiness Association. After his trial and acquittal by a Methodist ecclesiastical court for preaching interpretations of holiness doctrines that differed from the rest of the Methodist Church, Crumpler and several of his followers left the Methodist Church and formed a new denomination known as the Pentecostal Holiness Church ("Pentecostal" being a common name for holiness believers at the time).

The first convention was held at Fayetteville, North Carolina in 1900. The convention adopted a denominational discipline, and Crumpler was elected president. In 1901 at a meeting in Magnolia, North Carolina, the word "Pentecostal" was dropped from the name to more fully associate the church with the holiness movement. For the next eight years, the church would be known as "The Holiness Church of North Carolina". The church had congregations outside of North Carolina as well, principally in South Carolina and Virginia.

Gaston B. Cashwell, a minister of the Methodist Church, joined Crumpler's group in 1903. He became a leading figure in the church and the Pentecostal movement on the east coast. In 1906, he traveled to Los Angeles to visit the Pentecostal revival at the Azusa Street mission. While there he professed having received the baptism in the Holy Spirit and the evidence of speaking in tongues. Upon returning to Dunn, North Carolina, in December 1906, Cashwell preached the Pentecost experience in the local holiness church.

The influence of the Pentecostal renewal grew while, at the same time, the leader and founder of the church, Abner Crumpler, though willing to accept speaking in tongues, did not accept the idea that it was the initial evidence of the baptism of the Holy Spirit. At the annual conference of 1908, Crumpler was re-elected president of the body; however, with a majority of the delegates having experienced tongues, he permanently disaffiliated himself from the church. After Crumpler's departure, the conference added an article to the statement of faith, recognizing tongues as the initial evidence:

We believe the pentecostal baptism of the Holy Ghost and fire is obtainable by a definite act of appropriating faith on the part of the fully cleansed believer, and the initial evidence of the reception of this experience is speaking with other tongues as the Spirit gives utterance (Luke 11:13; Acts 1:5; 2:1-4; 8:17; 10:44-46; 19:6).

The PHC Foreign Mission Board was formed in 1904, and its members were all women. In 1907, Tom J. McIntosh, a PHC member, traveled to China and may have been the first Pentecostal missionary to reach that nation.

=== Mergers and schisms ===
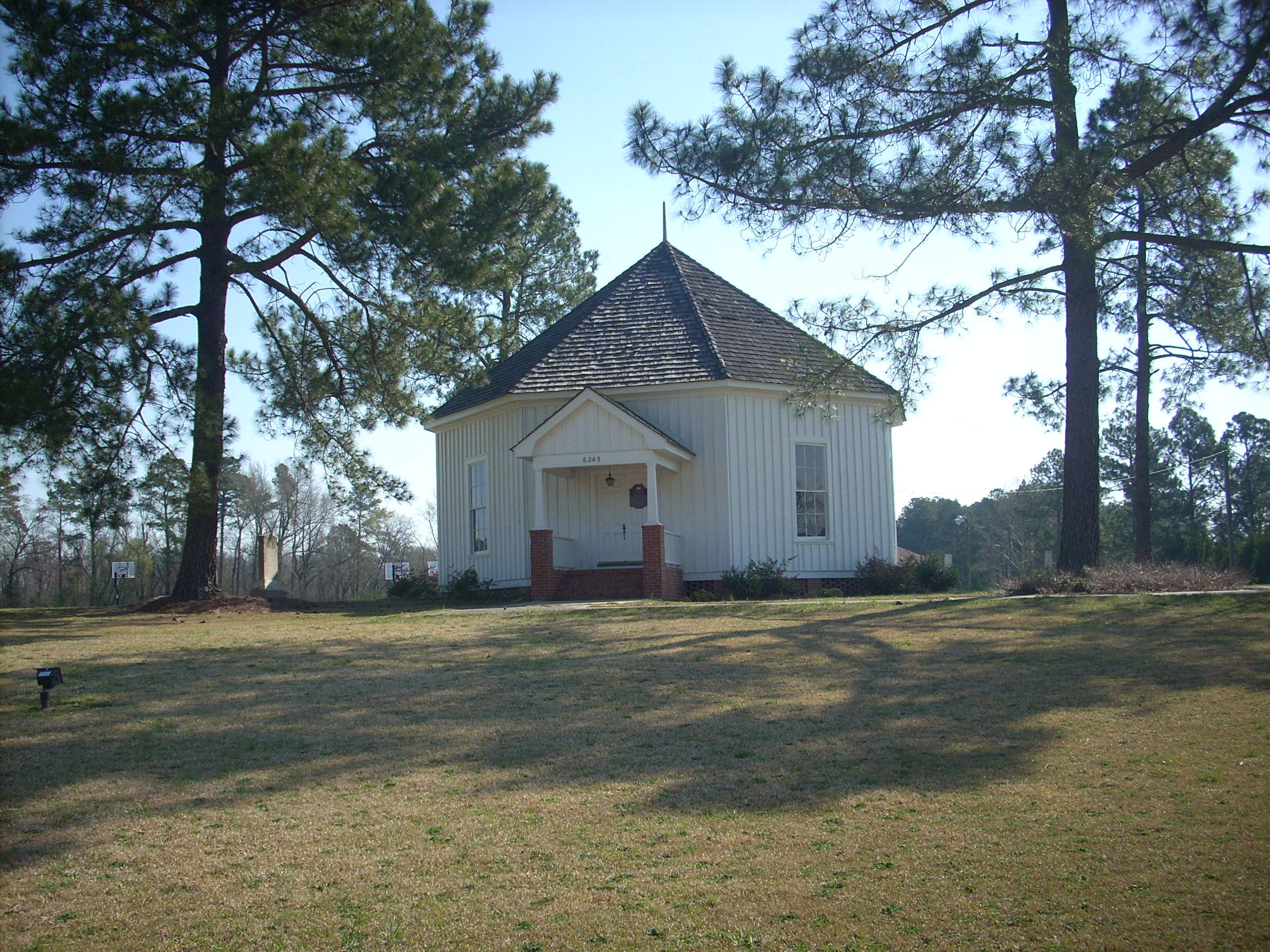
The octagonal Falcon Tabernacle was the site of the 1911 merger.

The Fire-Baptized Holiness Association also embraced Pentecostalism around the same time, taking the line that the baptism in the Holy Spirit was the "baptism of fire" that it had been seeking. Given the similarities in doctrine and geographic reach with the Pentecostal Holiness Church, the two groups began talks on a merger. The two groups merged on January 30, 1911, at the Falcon Tabernacle in Falcon, North Carolina. The new denomination took the name of the smaller of the two, Pentecostal Holiness Church. S.D. Page was elected the first General Superintendent.

Following the 1911 merger, the Tabernacle Pentecostal Church, originally the Brewerton Presbyterian Church, merged with the Pentecostal Holiness Church in 1915. Having Presbyterian roots and located mostly in South Carolina, this group of around 15 congregations was affiliated with Nickles Holmes Bible College in Greenville. After the mergers, the new denomination, which continued to go by the name Pentecostal Holiness Church, had about 200 churches with approximately 5,000 members. Property for the denomination's first headquarters was purchased in 1918 for $9,000 in Franklin Springs, Georgia.

In 1918, several PHC members who wanted stricter standards concerning dress, amusements, tobacco, and association between the sexes withdrew to form the Pentecostal Fire-Baptized Holiness Church. In 1920, another schism came into the Pentecostal Holiness Church over divine healing and the use of medicine. Some pastors believed that while divine healing was provided in the atonement, Christians still had the right to turn to medicine and doctors. The majority of the church—as did many Pentecostals of the time—believed in trusting God for healing without turning to earthly means. The minority withdrew and formed the Congregational Holiness Church in 1921.

=== Further development ===
The Pentecostal Holiness Church was a charter member of the National Association of Evangelicals in 1943 and joined the Pentecostal Fellowship of North America in 1948. At the general conference a year later an attempt at merging with the mostly black United Holy Church failed when the United Holy Church asked if their members could attend the church's schools and colleges.

In the 1960s, the Pentecostal Holiness Church began to branch out beyond the United States by affiliating with sister Pentecostal bodies in other parts of the world. In 1967, an affiliation was formed with the Pentecostal Methodist Church of Chile, one of the largest national Pentecostal churches in the world and the largest non-Catholic church in Chile. At the time, the Jotabeche Pentecostal Methodist congregation was the largest church in the world with over 60,000 members. With over 150,000 members, it ranks second to the Yoido Full Gospel Church in Seoul, South Korea. This denomination claims 1.7 million adherents. A similar affiliation was forged in 1985 with the Wesleyan Methodist Church of Brazil. A Neo-Pentecostal body with roots in the Brazilian Methodist Church, the Wesleyan Church numbered some 50,000 members and adherents in 1995. The word International was added to the church's name in 1975.

=== Recent history ===
The largest Pentecostal Holiness churches in the United States include The Gate Church in Oklahoma City, pastored by Jordan Roberts (founded by Tony Miller; Northwood Temple in Fayetteville, North Carolina, pastored by John Hedgepeth; SpiritLife Church (formerly known as Evangelistic Temple) in Tulsa, Oklahoma, pastored by Tommy McLaurin; Eastpointe Community Church in Oklahoma City, pastored by Shon and Rachel Burchett; All Nations Church in Tallassee, Florida, pastored by Steve Dow; and Tree of Life Ministries in Lynchburg, VA, pastored by Mike Dodson.

In 2000, the IPHC reported 10,463 churches and over a million members worldwide (over 3.4 million including affiliates). In 2010, membership in the United States was 289,475 in 1,995 churches. There were 28 regional conferences and missionaries in more than 90 nations. International offices were once located in Franklin Springs, Georgia, but are now located in Bethany, Oklahoma, a suburb of Oklahoma City.

In January 2011, the PHC celebrated the 1911 merger centennial with special events at Falcon, North Carolina.

In 2024, the IPHC reported 1,600 churches in the United States, a decline from the 2000 figures.

== Doctrine ==
The doctrine of the Pentecostal Holiness Church is articulated in the Apostles' Creed and the Articles of Faith. The Articles were placed in their present form in 1945. The first four articles are essentially the same as the first four Articles of Religion of the Methodist Church.

The IPHC believes in common evangelical beliefs, including the Trinity, the dual nature of Christ, his crucifixion for the forgiving of sins, his resurrection and ascension to heaven, the inerrancy of the Bible, a literal belief in heaven and hell, and the responsibility of every believer to carry out the Great Commission. The church holds water baptism and communion (open communion observed quarterly) to be divine ordinances. Though not considered an ordinance, some of the churches also engage in the practice of feet washing.

=== Cardinal doctrines ===
Since the adoption of the article of faith on the baptism of the Holy Spirit in 1908, the Pentecostal Holiness Church has taught the following beliefs as their five cardinal doctrines: justification by faith, entire sanctification, the baptism in the Holy Spirit evidenced by speaking in tongues, Christ's atonement (including divine healing), and the premillennial second coming of Christ.

==== Justification by faith ====
The Pentecostal Holiness Church believes that no amount of good works can achieve justification or salvation. This is achieved only "on the basis of our faith in the shed blood, the resurrection, and the justifying righteousness" of Christ. Good works, however, are a product of salvation. "When we believe on Jesus Christ as our Savior, our sins are pardoned, we are justified, and we enter a state of righteousness, not our own, but His, both imputed and imparted".

==== Sanctification ====
As a holiness church, the PHC believes that for the Christian there is not only justification and forgiveness for actual transgressions but also "complete cleansing of the justified believer from all indwelling sin and from its pollution." This cleansing is not "maturity" but a "crisis experience" and a "definite, instantaneous work of grace, obtainable by faith." The church recognizes that there is maturity and growth in the life of the believer, but states that "we must get into this grace before we can grow in it." The sanctified life is described as "one of separation from the world, a selfless life, a life of devotion to all the will of God, a life of holiness ... a life controlled by 'perfect love' which 'casteth out fear.'" The Pentecostal Holiness Church specifically rejects absolute perfection, angelic perfection, and sinless perfection—terms that imply that it is impossible for a sanctified believer to commit sin.

==== Baptism with the Holy Spirit ====
As a Pentecostal church, the PHC believes the "baptism with the Holy Ghost and fire is obtainable by a definite act of appropriating faith on the part of the fully cleansed believer." Spirit baptism is available to all believers and provides empowerment to witness for Christ. To receive the baptism, a person must have a "clean heart and life" and to "live in the fullness of the Holy Spirit's power and possession, one must continue to live a clean and consecrated life, free from sin, strife, worldliness, and pride, and must avoid attitudes and actions that tend to 'grieve' or 'quench' the Holy Spirit."

The Pentecostal Holiness Church distinguishes the initial evidence of Spirit baptism - which all believers experience when Spirit baptized - from the gift of tongues, which is not given to every Spirit-filled believer. Speaking in tongues is only the first sign of Spirit baptism. Other evidence that will follow Spirit baptism include: the fruit of the Spirit, power to witness for Christ, and power to endure the testings of faith and the oppositions of the world. Besides speaking in tongues, other spiritual gifts recorded in the Bible (specifically in 1 Corinthians 12, 13, and 14) are encouraged to operate in Pentecostal Holiness congregations for the edification of the Body of Christ.

==== Divine healing ====
The PHC believes that "provision was made in the atonement for the healing of our bodies". Congregations will pray for the healing of sick people and church elders will lay hands on and anoint the person being prayed over. While in its early years the Pentecostal Holiness were against receiving medical care, emphasizing divine healing, that is not the case today. The church teaches that Christians should believe in divine healing but also teaches that medical knowledge comes to humanity through God's grace.

==== Second Coming ====
The PHC believes in the imminent, personal, premillennial second coming of Jesus Christ. It will occur in two stages: the first stage will be the rapture of the saints before the Tribulation, and the second stage will be at the end of the Tribulation when Christ will return to defeat the Antichrist, judge the nations of the world, and begin his millennial reign.

== Structure ==
Reflecting its Methodist heritage, the IPHC is governed under the principles of connectionalism, a mixed system of episcopal and congregational polity. Authority in the church is shared between local churches, quadrennial conferences, and the General Conference.

Pentecostal Holiness congregations are self-governing in local affairs and are led by pastors. The pastor preaches, administers the ordinances, and promotes the "spiritual welfare" of congregants. Furthermore, the pastor is the chairman of the church board. Other than the pastor, the church board consists of deacons and a secretary/treasurer elected by the church members. The board is accountable to the pastor and church members, and pastors are accountable to the quadrennial conferences.

Geographically, churches are organized into conferences led by conference superintendents. In their spiritual roles, superintendents function as bishops, and in their administrative roles they act as chief executive officers of their conference. All conference leaders are elected by their local conference but are accountable to the General Superintendent.

The General Conference is the highest administrative body in the church. Under it are regional, annual, district, and missionary conferences. When the General Conference is out of session, the Council of Bishops acts as the church's governing body. In the IPHC, the terms "bishop" and "superintendent" are used interchangeably. The church recognizes the biblical office of bishop but does not believe in an historical episcopate or adhere to the doctrine of apostolic succession. The General Superintendent and Presiding Bishop, Dr. A. Doug Beacham Jr., was elected in 2012.

== Educational institutions ==
The IPHC has four affiliated institutions of higher education. The IPHC colleges are Emmanuel University in Franklin Springs, Georgia; Holmes Bible College in Greenville, South Carolina; Southwestern Christian University in Bethany, Oklahoma; and Advantage College in San Jose, California.

== Charitable institutions ==
Charitable organizations include the Falcon Children's Home, Alternative to Abortion Ministries, New Life Adoption Agency, and Bethany Children's Health Center.

== Notable clergy ==
- Oral Roberts, a renowned American Charismatic Christian preacher and televangelist
- C. M. Ward, a former Assemblies of God radio preacher and supporter of the Washington for Jesus movement
