= List of people associated with Australian Christian Churches =

This is a list of notable people who are currently or have been associated with Australian Christian Churches (ACC). ACC was formerly known as Assemblies of God in Australia (AOG).

== Pastors ==
Name	Alive	Notability
Keith Ainge	? –	National Secretary, former Senior Pastor of ACC churches in Western Melbourne, Katoomba, Perth, Canberra and Campbelltown, Sydney
Wayne Alcorn	? –	Senior Pastor of Hope Centre International, National President of Australian Christian Churches
Alun Davies	? –	Senior pastor of Faith! Christian Church, National Vice President
Phil Dooley	? –	Lead Pastor of Hillsong Cape Town
Philip Duncan	? –	Former National President, former Senior Pastor of Petersham Assembly of God
Andrew Evans	1935–2023	Former Senior Pastor of Paradise Community Church, former National President and host of Inflencers Conference.
Ashley Evans	? –	Senior Pastor of Paradise Community Church, National Executive Member and State President of South Australia
Russell Evans	? –	Senior Pastor of Planetshakers City Church, Melbourne, and State Executive of Victoria
Charles Greenwood	1891–1969	First National President, founding Senior Pastor of Richmond Assembly of God (now Bridge Church)
Danny Guglielmucci	? –	Founding Senior Pastor of Edge Church, National Executive Member
Tim Hall	1948 –	International evangelist with Tim Hall International Ministries Inc., founding Pastor of Miracle City Church, was youth pastor at Paradise Community Church and has pioneered several other ACC churches.
Jack Hanes	? –	President of AOG World Missions, Global Pastor of Imagine Nations Church
Philip Hills	? –	Former Senior Pastor of Richmond Assembly of God (now Bridge Church) (Australia's first Pentecostal church, Former Vice President and State President of Victoria.
Bobbie Houston	1957 –	Founding Senior Pastor of Hillsong Church, women's ministry including Colour Your World Women's Conference
Brian Houston	1954 –	Founding Senior Pastor of Hillsong Church, National President
Frank Houston	1922–2004	Founding Pastor of Sydney Christian Life Centre (now the "City" campus of Hillsong Church), former Superindenant of the Assemblies of God in New Zealand
Reginald Klimionok	? –	Former Senior Pastor of Garden City Christian Church, Former National Executive Member and State Executive of Queensland
John McMartin	1954–	Founder of Inspire Church, Liverpool, and State President of the Australian Christian Churches from ~2008~2015. Arrested in November 2020 for alleged sexual assault.
Pat Mesiti	? –	Former Director of Youth Alive Australia, former Executive Director of Teen Challenge New South Wales
Michael Murphy	? –	Former Senior Pastor of Shirelive Church, National Executive Member
Steve Penny	? –	Senior Pastor of Kings Christian Church, National Executive Member
Ralph Read	? –	Former National President, former Senior Pastor of ACC churches including the ACC church in Orange, New South Wales
Anthony Venn-Brown	1951 –	Former evangelist and Founder of Youth Alive NSW
Ian Woods	1945–2016	Former senior Pastor of Hawkesbury Christian Centre, Former National Executive Member and Former State President of New South Wales

== Artists/musicians ==
Name	Alive	Notability
Geoff Bullock	1956 –	Former Worship Pastor at Hillsong Church
Darlene Zschech	1965 –	Senior Pastor of Hope Unlimited Church, former Worship Pastor at Hillsong Church, international artist.

== Politicians ==
Name	Alive	Notability
Andrew Evans	1935 –	Member of South Australian Legislative Council (Family First Party) (2002 – 2008)
Alex Hawke	1977	Member of the Australian House of Representatives (Liberal Party) for the electoral Division of Mitchell from 2007: Assistant Minister to the Treasurer from 21 September 2015
Scott Morrison	1968 –	Prime Minister of Australia (Since 24 August 2018) Attends Hillsong Church. Member of the House of Representatives (Liberal Party) electoral Division of Cook from 2007: Minister for Immigration and Border Protection 18 September 2013 – 23 December 2014; Minister for Social Services from 23 December 2014 – 21 September 2015; Treasurer of Australia from 21 September 2015 – 24 August 2018
Stuart Robert	1970-	Minister for the National Disability Insurance Scheme (Since 29 May 2019)
Adrian Schrinner	??	62nd Lord Mayor of Brisbane (Since 8 April 2019)

== See also ==
- List of Assemblies of God people
