= List of Pentecostal churches =

This is a list of current and former individual local Pentecostal places of worship, i.e. church buildings and congregations, that are individually notable. Some may be notable for their historic buildings listed on a historic register. This is not a list of Pentecostal denominations or movements.

== Australia ==
The International Network of Churches (formerly the Christian Outreach Centre) and Australian Christian Churches are networks of Pentecostal churches in Australia. Individual churches include:

- Bayside Church
- Citipointe Church
- CityLife Church
- Hillsong Brisbane Campus
- Hillsong Church
- Inspire Church
- Kings Christian Church
- Influencers Church
- Planetshakers Church
- Potter's House
- Shirelive Church
- Youth Alive
- United Pentecostal Church

== Brazil ==
- Universal Church of the Kingdom of God
- Assembleias de Deus
- Christian Congregation of Brazil

== Canada ==
- Central Pentecostal Tabernacle, Edmonton, Alberta
- Trinity Pentecostal Church, Oshawa, Ontario
- The Embassy of The Kingdom of God, aka The Embassy in Oshawa, Ontario
- King Street Community Church, Oshawa, Ontario
- Liberty Pentecostal Church, Bowmanville, Ontario
- Christian Life Centre, Ajax, Ontario
- Limitless Church, Ajax, Ontario
- Healing Place, Oshawa, Ontario
- Whitby, Christian Assembly, Whitby, Ontario
- Pickering Pentecostal Church, Pickering, Ontario
- Calvary Pentecostal Church, Port Perry, Ontario
- Emmanuel Community Church, Port Perry, Ontario
- Newcastle Pentecostal Church, Newcastle, Ontario
- Highway Pentecostal Church, Brockville, Ontario

== Chile ==
- Evangelical Cathedral of Chile or Jotabeche Cathedral, part of First Methodist Pentecostal Church of Chile

== Finland ==
- Nurmijärvi Pentecostal Church, Nurmijärvi, Uusimaa
- Siilinjärvi Pentecostal Church, Siilinjärvi, North Savo

== Ghana ==
- Prayer Cathedral of Action Chapel International, Accra Ghana

== Hong Kong ==
- Wing Kwong Pentecostal Holiness Church, Lok Fu, Wong Tai Sin District

== India ==
- Indian Pentecostal Church of God
- General Council of the Assemblies of God of India
- Church of God (Full Gospel) in India
- The Pentecostal Mission
- Full Gospel Pentecostal Church
- Saron Bethel Deva Sabai in India

== Indonesia ==
- Gereja Bethany Indonesia, Surabaya, Indonesia, a megachurch
- Indonesian Bethel Church
- Pentecostal Church in Indonesia
- West Kalimantan Christian Church

== Iran ==
- Assyrian Pentecostal Church, Kermanshah

== New Zealand ==
- City Impact Church New Zealand, East Coast Bays

== Nigeria ==
- The Redeemed Evangelical Mission, Lagos State
- Salvation Ministries, Port Harcourt, Rivers State
- Redeemed Christian Church of God, Lagos, a megachurch

== Norway ==
- Filadelfia Oslo

== Pakistan ==
- United Pentecostal Church in Pakistan

== Philippines ==
- Cathedral of Praise, Manila, a megachurch
- Favor Church Manila, Mandaluyong, Metro Manila

== Singapore ==
- New Creation Church, Buona Vista, Queenstown, a megachurch

== Sweden ==
- Habo Pentecostal Church, Habo
- Jönköping Pentecostal Church, Jönköping
- Mullsjö Pentecostal Church, Mullsjö
- Filadelfiakyrkan, Stockholm
- Umeå Pentecostal Church, Umeå

== United Kingdom ==
- Church of Pentecost, Green Lane Dagenham, London
- Peniel Pentecostal Church, Pilgrims Hatch, Brentwood, Essex
- Universal Church of the Kingdom of God, London and elsewhere
- Jubilee International Church, London
- Kensington Temple, London
- Kingsway International Christian Centre, London
- Living Word Christian Fellowship, London
- New Wine Church, London
- City of Faith Church, London
- Christian Centre, Nottingham, Nottingham

== United States ==
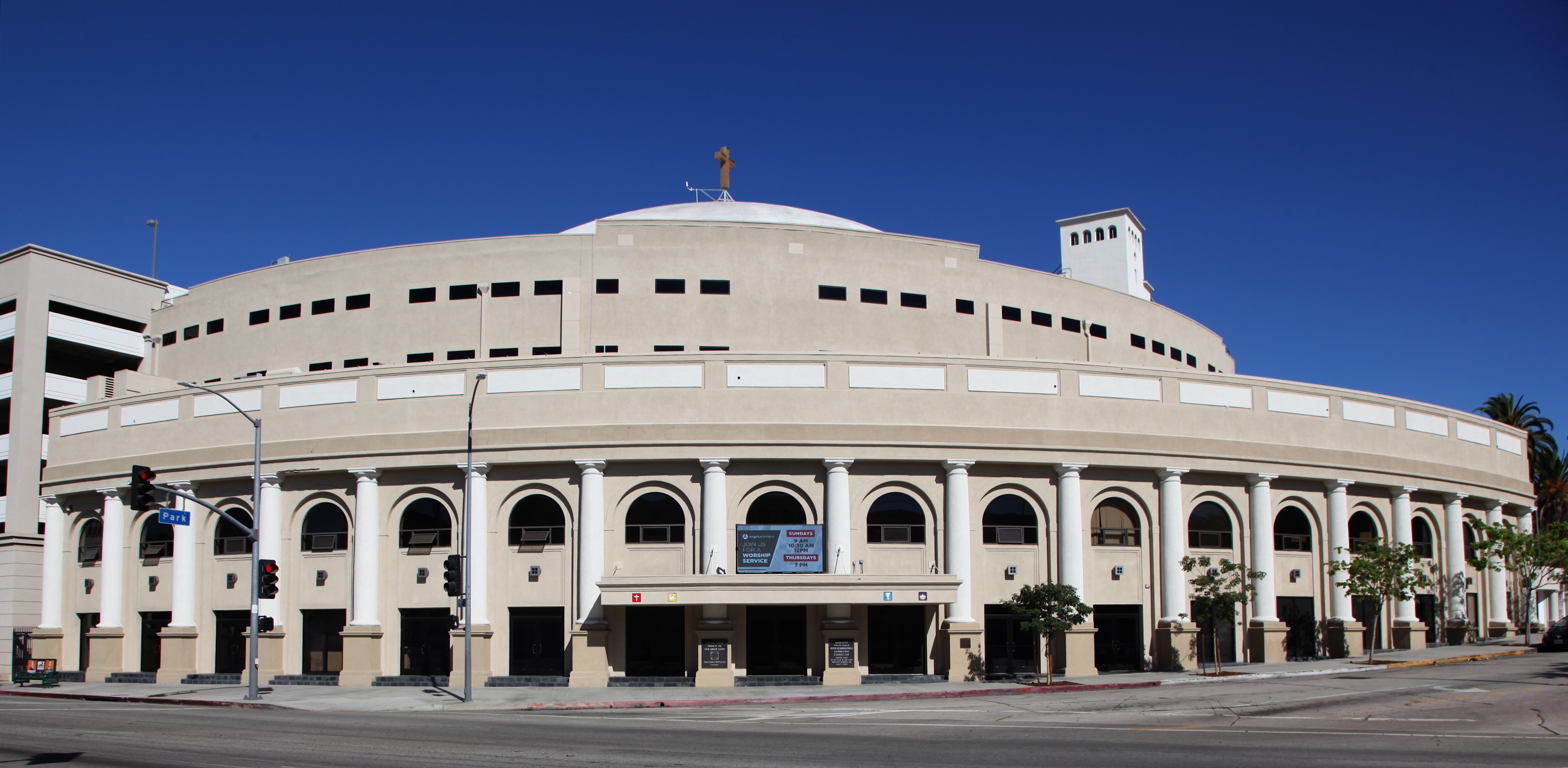
Angelus Temple

- Church of God (Cleveland, Tennessee)
- Church of God (Huntsville, Alabama)
- Garywood Assembly of God, Alabama
- Wasilla Assembly of God, Wasilla, Alaska
- Phoenix First Assembly of God, Phoenix, Arizona
- Melodyland Christian Center, Anaheim, California
- Angelus Temple, Los Angeles, California, a U.S. National Historic Landmark
- Dream Center, Los Angeles, California
- West Angeles Church of God in Christ, Los Angeles, California
- Bethel Church (Redding, California)
- Crossroads Community Cathedral, East Hartford, Connecticut
- Word of Life Christian Church, Chadwicks, New York
- World Harvest Church Columbus, Ohio
- Charismatic Episcopal Church, Malverne, New York

== Main sources ==
- Burgess, Stanley M.; Maas, Eduard M. van der, eds. (2002). The New International Dictionary of Pentecostal and Charismatic Movements (Rev. and exp. ed.). Grand Rapids, Mi: Zondervan. ISBN 978-0-310-22481-5.
