= List of megachurches affiliated with the Assemblies of God =

This is a list of megachurches affiliated with the Assemblies of God. A megachurch affiliated with the World Assemblies of God Fellowship having 2,000 or more worshippers for a typical weekly service. According to a 1996 statistic, nearly one in ten megachurches in the United States are affiliated with the General Council of the Assemblies of God.

== Assemblies of God megachurches by country ==
=== Australia ===
Churches part of the Assemblies of God in Australia;

- Futures Church in Paradise, Adelaide, SA (6,000)
- Horizon Church (formerly Shirelive Church) in Sutherland, Sydney, NSW (3,200)
- Garden City Christian Church in Mt Gravatt, Brisbane, QLD (3,000)
- Edge Church in Reynella, Adelaide, SA (3,000)
- Planetshakers City Church in East Melbourne, Melbourne, VIC (2,500)
- Inspire Church in Hoxton Park, Sydney, NSW (2,000)
- Calvary Christian Church in Buderim and Noosa, Sunshine Coast, QLD (2,000)
- Faith! Christian Church in Dandenong North, Melbourne, VIC (2,000)

=== Canada ===
There are 6 megachurches in Canada.

- Hope City Church, Edmonton, Alberta (4,000)
- Portico, A Community Church, Mississauga, Ontario (2,500)
- Agincourt Pentecostal Church, Toronto, Ontario (2,370)
- Central Community Church, St. Catharines, Ontario (2,200)
- Christian Life Assembly, Langley, British Columbia (2,200)
- Kennedy Road Church, Brampton, Ontario (2,000)

=== India ===
- New Life Assembly of God, Chennai (40,000)
- Bethel Assembly of God Church, Bethel AG Church, Bangalore (20,000)
- Hope Assembly of God Church, Chennai (5,000)
- Full Gospel Assembly of God, Bangalore(45,000)
- Mark Buntain Memorial Assembly of God Church (4,000)
- Victory International AG Church, Bangalore (4,000)
- Calvary AG Church, Salem, Tamil Nadu (3000)
- Calvary Assemblies of God, KGF Karnataka
- Bethel New Life International Church, India

=== New Zealand ===
- Auckland Samoan Assembly of God

=== Singapore ===
- Grace Assembly of God (4,000)
- Trinity Christian Centre (5,000)

=== Malaysia ===
- Calvary Church (10,000)

=== South Korea ===
- Yoido Full Gospel Church, Seoul (830,000)

=== United States ===
The following list of megachurches affiliated with the Assemblies of God USA are taken from the denomination's official 2017 statistics and are ordered by average attendance of Sunday worship services:

- Timberline Church, Fort Collins, Colorado – 16,604
- First Assembly of God, North Little Rock, Arkansas – 16,553
- New Life Covenant Assemblies of God, Chicago, Illinois – 15,375
- Dream City Church (formerly First Assembly of God), Phoenix, Arizona – 15,000
- James River Church, Ozark, Missouri – 11,000
- Calvary Church, Naperville, Illinois – 9,733
- Templo Calvario, Santa Ana, California – 8,750
- River Valley Church, Apple Valley, Minnesota – 8,643
- Grace Community Assembly of God, Whittier, California – 8,000
- Trinity Church, Cedar Hill, Texas – 7,521
- First Assembly of God, Fort Myers, Florida – 7,137
- River Church Favorday, Anaheim, California – 6,814
- First Assembly of God Life Center, Tacoma, Washington – 6,654
- King's Cathedral and Chapels, Kahului, Hawaii – 6,339
- Calvary Church Assembly of God, Irving, Texas – 6,046
- City First Church, Rockford, Illinois – 6,000
- Westover Hills Assembly of God, San Antonio, Texas – 5,712
- The House (formerly Calvary Temple Worship Center), Modesto, California – 5,500
- Faith Assembly of God, Orlando, Florida – 5,437
- Sheffield Family Life Center, Kansas City, Missouri – 5,423
- First Assembly of God, Griffin, Georgia – 5,317
- First Assembly of God, Grand Rapids, Michigan – 5,289
- Lighthouse Outreach Center, Waipahu, Hawaii – 5,110
- National Community Church, Washington, D.C. – 5,100
- People's Church, Oklahoma City, Oklahoma – 4,800
- Aguilas Centro Familiar Cristiano, Las Vegas, Nevada – 4,784
- Canyon Hills Assembly of God, Bakersfield, California – 4,500
- Iglesia El Calvario Assembly of God, Orlando, Florida – 4,500
- International Church, Las Vegas, Nevada – 4,500
- One Church, Gahanna, Ohio - 4,488
- New Life Church, Renton, Washington – 4,205
- Victory Worship Center, Tucson, Arizona – 4,200
- Calvary Temple, Concord, California – 3,955
- Family Community Church, San Jose, California – 3,950
- Calvary Christian Center, Ormond Beach, Florida – 3,941
- Destiny Christian Church, Rocklin, California – 3,825
- Radiant Church, Surprise, Arizona – 3,763
- Promise Church (formerly known as Full Gospel New York Church), Flushing, New York – 3,751
- Newlife Church on the Peninsula, Silverdale, Washington – 3,665
- The Oaks Fellowship, Red Oak, Texas – 3,644
- Iglesia Cristiana Ebenezer, Garland, Texas – 3,500
- First Assembly of God, Concord, North Carolina – 3,425
- First Assembly of God, Victorville, California – 3,373
- Mission Ebenezer Family Church, Carson, California – 3,250
- Copper Pointe Church, Albuquerque, New Mexico – 3,250
- Cornerstone Church, Madison, Tennessee – 3,239
- Canvas Church, Kalispell, Montana – 3,225
- First Assembly of God, Visalia, California – 3,157
- Victory Christian Center, Lowellville, Ohio – 3,144
- Journey Church, Kenosha, Wisconsin – 3,082
- Emmanuel Christian Center, Minneapolis, Minnesota – 3,051
- LifePoint Church, Clarksville, Tennessee - 3,019
- Faith Assembly of God, Summerville, South Carolina – 3,003
- The Greenhouse Church, Gainesville, Florida – 2,999
- Capital Christian Center, Sacramento, California – 2,993
- Crosswinds Assembly of God, Sparks, Nevada – 2,935
- Christian Life Center, Fort Lauderdale, Florida – 2,910
- Glad Tidings Assembly of God, West Lawn, Pennsylvania – 2,902
- Gateway Fellowship Church, San Antonio, Texas – 2,900
- Brightmoor Christian Church, Novi, Michigan – 2,845
- The Church at Chapel Hill, Douglasville, Georgia – 2,803
- Church of Hope, Sarasota, Florida – 2,755
- Eastridge Church, Issaquah, Washington – 2,713
- Venture Church, Mill Creek, Washington - 2,708
- Victory Church, Lakeland, Florida – 2,703
- Victorious Life Church, Wesley Chapel, Florida – 2,692
- LifeHouse Church, Hagerstown, Maryland – 2,686
- North Point Church, Springfield, Missouri – 2,660
- Discover Church, Oak Creek, Wisconsin – 2,628
- Crossroads Church, Lafayette, Louisiana – 2,589
- Newbreak Church, San Diego, California – 2,563
- New Life Church, Alamo, California – 2,554
- Casa Del Rey, Albuquerque, New Mexico – 2,500
- Christ Place Church, Lincoln, Nebraska – 2,383
- Assembly of God, Covina, California – 2,366
- Christian Life Center, Dayton, Ohio – 2,361
- Bonita Valley Community Church, Bonita, California – 2,312
- Bethany Christian Assembly, Everett, Washington – 2,312
- Victory Family Church, Norman, Oklahoma – 2,300
- Evergreen Christian Community, Olympia, Washington – 2,252
- First Assembly of God, Cape Girardeau, Missouri – 2,245
- The Peoples Church, Salem, Oregon – 2,215
- New Life Assembly of God, Lehigh Acres, Florida – 2,200
- Crossroads Community Cathedral, East Hartford, Connecticut – 2,171
- Lone Star Cowboy Church, Montgomery, Texas – 2,171
- Whittier Family Church, Whittier, California – 2,146
- Cornerstone Church, Bowie, Maryland – 2,127
- Evangel Assembly of God, Bismarck, North Dakota – 2,103
- South Hills Community Church, Corona, California – 2,100
- Journey Church, Fairview Park, Ohio – 2,100
- Walnut Park Assembly of God, Garland, Texas – 2,100
- Romanian Assembly of God, Portland, Oregon – 2,000
- Reach Church, Austin, Texas – 2,000
- Freedom Church, Carrollton, Texas – 2,000
