= National Conference of Australian Christian Churches =

The National Conference of Australian Christian Churches is the biennial conference for the leadership of Australian Christian Churches, the Australian branch of the Assemblies of God (AOG). The first conference, held in 1937, founded the denomination by the amalgamation of the Pentecostal Church of Australia and the Assemblies of God in Queensland. Scott Morrison gave a speech to the conference in 2021.

== About ==
The National Conference is a gathering of Australian Christian Churches leaders across Australia to enjoy fellowship with each other and to discuss and vote on important issues as a denomination. The National Conference, along with the State Conferences, let pastors and leaders join as a denomination and be empowered and encouraged. The National Conference brings pastors and leaders up to date on the state of the denomination by the National Executive, finding out how each of the departments and ministries are going.

== List of National Conferences ==
| Year | Location | Notes |
|---|---|---|
| 1937 | The Pentecostal Church, Sydney, NSW | Amalgamation of two denominations to form the Assemblies of God in Australia |
| 1939 | Richmond Temple, Melbourne, VIC | ? |
| 1941 | ? | Henry Wiggins was elected as Chairman of ACC |
| 1943 | ? | Held in the midst of the Second World War |
| 1945 | Glad Tidings Tebernacle, Brisbane, QLD | Philip Duncan was elected as Chairman of ACC |
| 1947 | Assembly of God Tebernacle, Hamilton, NSW | A bible school fund was opened, and in the following year Commonwealth Bible College (now Southern Cross College) was opened |
| 1949 | ? | ? |
| 1951 | Brisbane, QLD | Newly elected Chairman of ACC Alec Davidson launched the 'Christ for the Crisis Hour' crusade |
| 1953 | Victoria | The Authorised Version of the bible was recommended as the accepted bible in ACC |
| 1955 | ? | Evangelism was a dominant theme |
| 1957 | Brisbane, QLD | A commitment to foreign and home missions was renewed |
| 1959 | ? | Alec Davidson was elected as Superintendent for the second time |
| 1961 | ? | ? |
| 1963 | ? | Appointment of the Department of Evangelism |
| 1965 | ? | Royal Rangers was introduced to Assemblies of God churches |
| 1967 | ? | The consideration of establishing a national headquarters was pushed forward |
| 1969 | ? | George Forbes was appointed Director of Foreign Missions |
| 1971 | ? | ? |
| 1973 | ? | A special 'Committee on Restructure' was appointed for the future |
| 1975 | Stanwell Tops, NSW | The Holy Spirit moved, calling pastors and leaders to wait upon the Lord's direction |
| 1977 | Melbourne, VIC | Andrew Evans becomes the Superintendent. Guest speaker Dr. Yonggi Cho from Korea |
| 1979 | Brisbane, QLD | Theme was 'Reach Out' |
| 1981 | Adelaide, SA | Theme was 'Every Town' expressing the desire to have an ACC church in every town |
| 1983 | Canberra, ACT | Theme was 'Let's take the Nations' |
| 1985 | Melbourne, VIC | Theme was 'Evangelise' |
| 1987 | Brisbane, QLD | Celebrating 50 years and 500 churches |
| 1989 | ? | The 1990s were declared a 'Decade of Harvest' |
| 1991 | ? | ? |
| 1993 | ? | ? |
| 1995 | ? | ? |
| 1997 | Adelaide, SA | Brian Houston becomes the national leader |
| 1999 | Canberra, ACT | Constitutional changes including changing the title of Superintendent to National President |
| 2001 | Melbourne Concert Hall, Melbourne, VIC | Theme was 'Accelerate' |
| 2003 | Brisbane, QLD | Theme was 'Momentum'. David Cartledge honoured after 26 years on the National Executive |
| 2005 | Hillsong Church, Sydney, NSW | The National Conference hosted the World Assemblies of God Congress |
| 2007 | Gold Coast, QLD | The public name of the denomination was changed to Australia Christian Churches |
| 2009 | Gold Coast, QLD | Wayne Alcorn succeeds Brian Houston as National President. Southern Cross College launches its new name Alphacrucis |
| 2013 | Gold Coast, QLD | |
| 2015 | Gold Coast, QLD | |

== See also ==
- Australian Christian Churches
