= Ralph Reed (disambiguation) =

Ralph Reed is an American political consultant, known as the first head of the Christian Coalition.

Ralph Reed may also refer to:

- Ted Reed (Ralph Edwin Reed, 1890–1959), American baseball player
- Ralph Reed (American Express), former CEO of American Express
- Ralph Reed (actor) (1931-1997), actor Fireside Theatre (1952), Gunsmoke (1958)

== See also ==
- Ralph Read, pastor
