= Air Church =

Coordinates: 28°06′02″S 153°24′22″E

AIR Church
- AIR Church
- Location: 1/492 Scottsdale Dr, Varsity Lakes, Queensland 4226
- Country: Australia
- Denomination: Australian Christian Churches
- Tradition: Pentecostal
- Website: airchurch.org.au

History
- Founded: 22 March 2006

AIR Church, formerly Metro Church (registered as Metro Church Australia), located on the Gold Coast, Queensland, Australia, is a Pentecostal church affiliated with Australian Christian Churches.

== History ==
The church was pioneered by Garry McDonald in 2006 with a clear and specific focus to help people understand the nature of the grace of God.

Metro had its official launch in March 2006 at the Gold Coast Convention Centre.

In 2008, Metro received an old church facility at 116 Ridgeway Avenue Southport as a freehold gift. This was renovated and re-opened in August of that year. In late 2018 the Southport building was sold and became a mosque, and Metro Church relocated to its current Varsity Lakes venue on Scottsdale Drive in December the same year.

Senior pastors Dave and Jenny Gilpin were appointed on 28 November 2020, after the McDonalds had completed their term.

The church was renamed to Air Church in August 2021, with its business name changed to Air Church Australia on 17 September 2021. The Gilpins resigned as senior pastors in May 2022 to do itinerant ministry. Pastors James and Sally Foord were commissioned as the new senior pastors on Sunday 29 May.

Former director, Garry McDonald and the board were in dispute over financial matters; however this was settled outside of court.

== Beliefs ==
AIR Church is a Pentecostal church affiliated with Australian Christian Churches (the Australian branch of the Assemblies of God). The senior pastors as of May 2022 are James & Sally Foord.

The business entity remains incorporated as Metro Church Australia, and it is still registered as a charitable organisation under this name.
