= Lists of Christians =

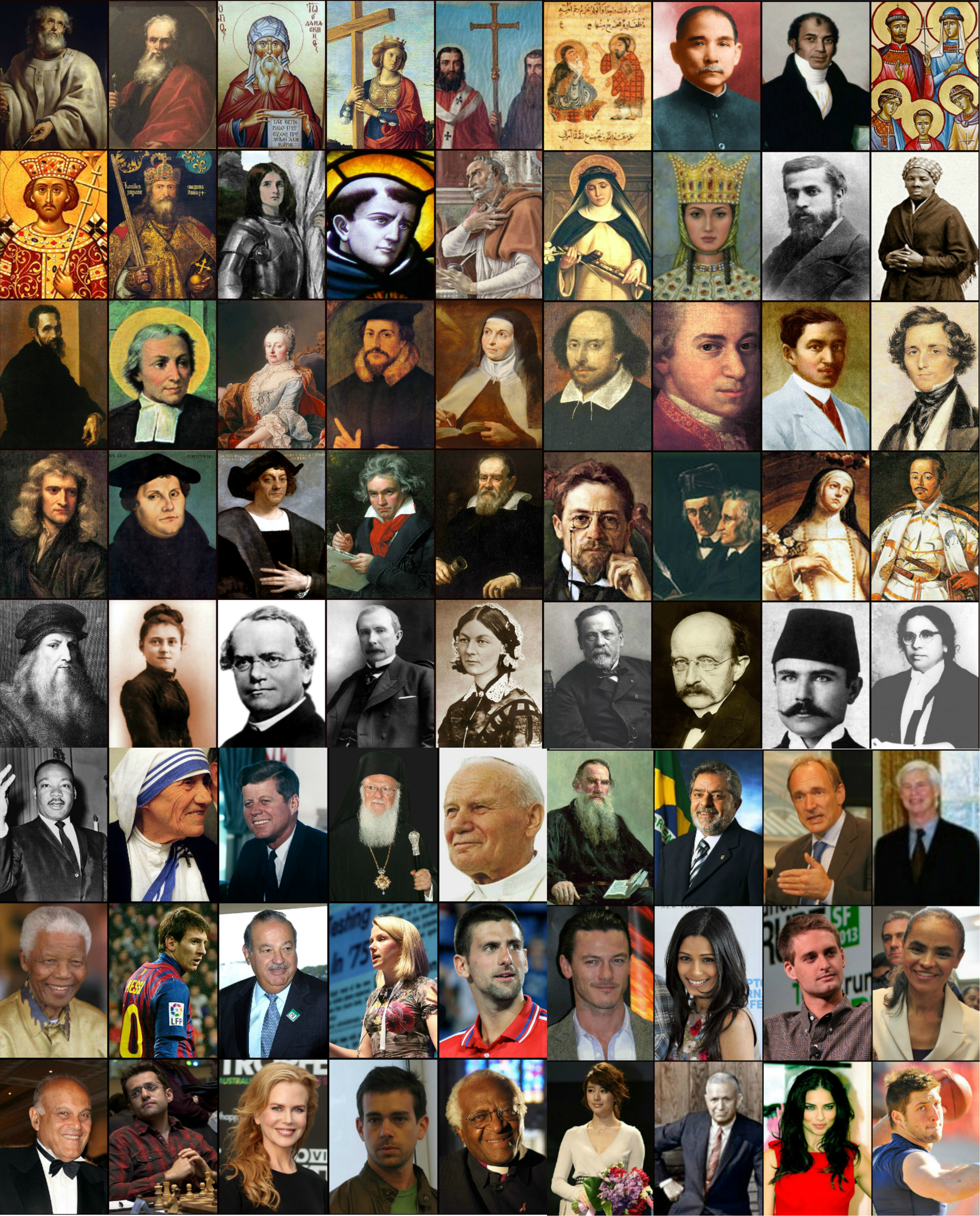
Set of pictures for a number of famous Christians from various fields

Christians have made many contributions in a broad and diverse range of fields, including the sciences, arts, politics, literatures, sports and business.

== Clergy ==
- List of abbots of Abingdon
- List of abunas of Ethiopia
- List of Anglican diocesan bishops in Britain and Ireland
- List of archbishops of Cyprus
- List of archbishops of Uppsala
- List of Armenian catholicoi of Cilicia
- List of Armenian patriarchs of Constantinople
- List of Armenian patriarchs of Jerusalem
- Lists of popes, patriarchs, primates, archbishops, and bishops
- List of current cardinals
- List of cardinal-nephews
- List of hierarchs of the Romanian Orthodox Church
- List of Lutheran clergy
- Master of the Order of Preachers
- List of metropolitans and patriarchs of Moscow
- List of Eastern Orthodox bishops and archbishops
- Lists of patriarchs
- List of current popes and patriarchs
- List of Christian clergy in politics
- List of popes
- List of popes (graphical)
- List of Christian preachers
- List of primates of the Orthodox Church in America
- List of television evangelists
- List of ordained Christian women

== By denomination ==
Many denominations of Christianity exist today. Featured below are members of some of them.

- Lists of Catholics
  - List of Maronites
- List of Eastern Orthodox Christians
- List of Protestants
  - List of Anglicans
  - List of Baptists
  - List of evangelical Christians
  - List of Mennonites
  - List of Methodists
  - List of Pentecostals
    - List of Assemblies of God people
    - List of people associated with Australian Christian Churches
  - List of Presbyterians
    - List of Australian Presbyterians
    - List of Irish Presbyterians
  - List of Puritans
  - List of Seventh-day Adventists
- List of Nontrinitarians
  - List of Christian Scientists (religious denomination)
  - List of Christian universalists
  - List of Unitarians, Universalists, and Unitarian Universalists
  - List of Latter Day Saints

== By nationality ==
- List of Middle Eastern Christians
- Armenia:
  - List of Armenian catholicoi of Cilicia
  - List of Armenian patriarchs of Constantinople
  - List of Armenian patriarchs of Jerusalem
- Australia:
  - List of people associated with Australian Christian Churches
  - List of Australian Presbyterians
- Britain: List of Anglican diocesan bishops in Britain and Ireland
- Cyprus: List of archbishops of Cyprus
- Ethiopia: List of abunas of Ethiopia
- Ireland:
  - List of Anglican diocesan bishops in Britain and Ireland
  - List of Irish Presbyterians
- Pakistan: List of Pakistani Christians
- Palestine: List of Palestinian Christians
- Romania: List of hierarchs of the Romanian Orthodox Church
- Russia: List of metropolitans and patriarchs of Moscow
- Sweden: List of archbishops of Uppsala
- United States: List of Catholic archbishops of Atlanta

== By profession (non-clerical) ==
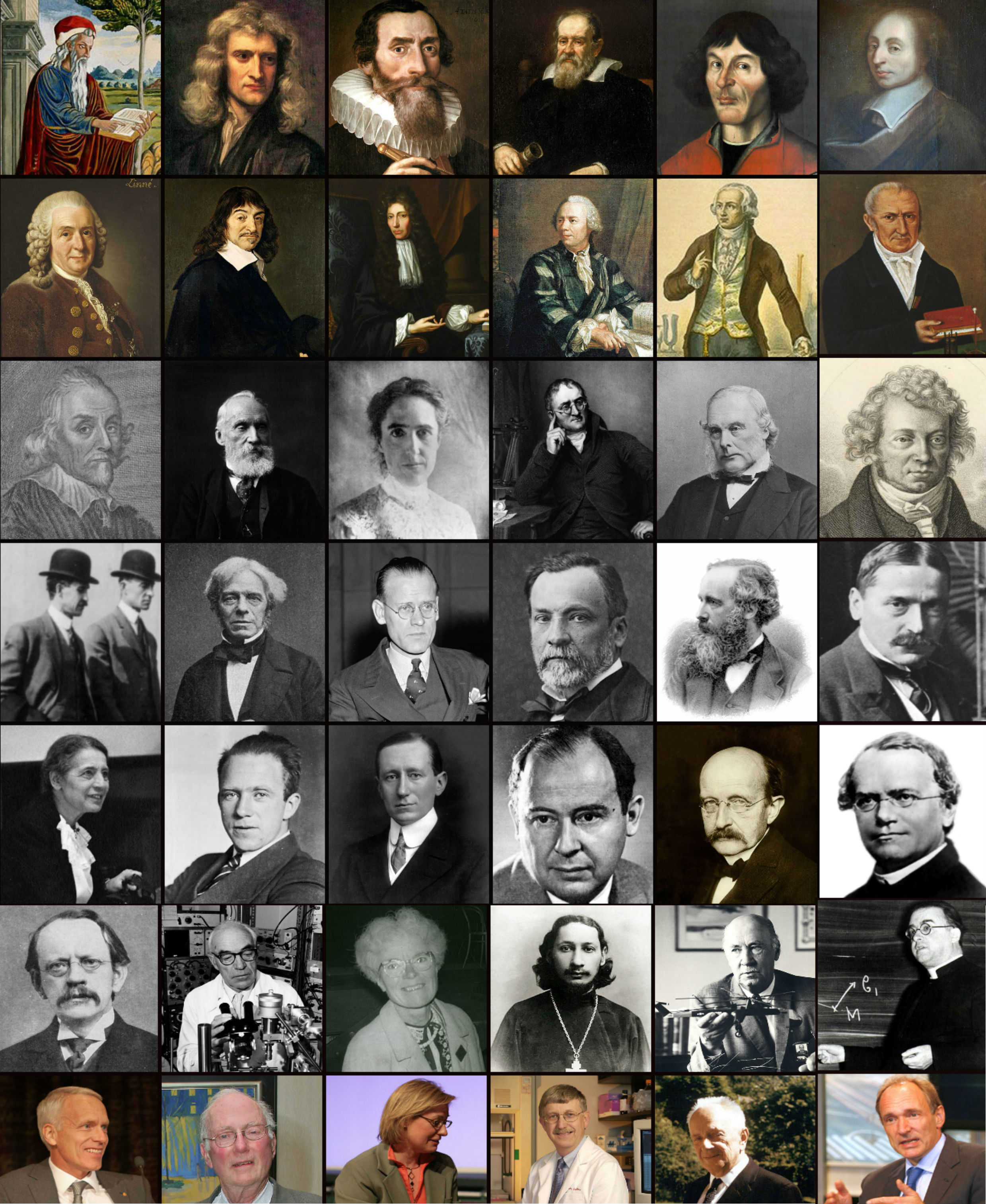
Set of pictures for a number of notable Christian scientists and inventors.

- List of Catholic artists
- List of Catholic musicians
- List of Catholic philosophers and theologians
- List of Catholic writers
- List of lay Catholic scientists
- List of Knights Templar
- List of Protestant authors
- List of Protestant missionaries in China
- List of Christian missionaries
- List of Christians in science and technology
- List of Christian Nobel laureates
- List of Christian theologians

== Other ==
- List of Christian socialists
- List of converts to Christianity
- Christian martyrs
- List of members of Opus Dei
- List of Protestant Reformers
- List of people with Restoration Movement ties
- List of saints
- List of Roman Catholic cleric-scientists
- List of Christian leftists
- List of Christian democrats

== See also ==
- List of Christian denominations
- Lists of people by belief
- List of lists of lists
