= Charles Greenwood (pastor) =

Australian pastor

Charles Lewis Greenwood (1891–1969) was an Australian Pentecostal Christian pastor in the Assemblies of God. He is credited for the revival and church that was integral to the formation of the Assemblies of God in Australia.

== Early life ==
Greenwood was born in Melbourne and was one of 12 children; he became a Christian at the age of 19.

== Richmond Temple and the Sunshine Revival ==
Greenwood married Frances Reed in 1915, and the following year they began holding prayer meetings in their home in Sunshine, Melbourne. Greenwood established the Sunshine Gospel Hall in 1925, and during a two-week campaign with evangelist A. C. Valdez, revival broke out. Over 200 people attended these meetings. Later that year Greenwood moved the church to the Richmond Theatre, (343 Bridge Road) changing its name to Richmond Temple.

== Assemblies of God in Australia ==
After the Sunshine Revival of February 1926, other Pentecostal assemblies sought affiliation and Richmond Temple became the mother church of a network of Pentecostal churches which became the Pentecostal Church of Australia. In 1937, Greenwood met with the leaders of the Assemblies of God Queensland to unite and form a single denomination. The Assemblies of God in Australia was established and Greenwood became the first Chairman.

Preceded by None	National President of the Assemblies of God in Australia; 1937–1941	Succeeded by Henry Wiggins

Preceded by Henry Wiggins	National President of the Assemblies of God in Australia; 1943–1945	Succeeded by Philip Duncan
