= Excelsia University College =

Tertiary education provider in Sydney, New South Wales, Australia

- Former names: Wesley Institute, Wesley Institute for Ministry and the Arts
- Type: Private college
- Established: 1983
- Affiliations: CCCU
- Director: Peter McKeon
- Students: 1350 (2020)
- Location: Sydney, New South Wales, Australia; 33°44′23.3232″S 151°4′9.3174″E
- Campus: 1 City View Road, Pennant Hills, New South Wales
- Colours: Navy blue Gold
- Website: Official website

Excelsia University College, formerly Wesley Institute, is a tertiary education provider in Sydney, New South Wales, Australia, offering undergraduate and postgraduate degrees in counselling, creative and performing arts, education, social work and business.

== History ==
The college was founded in 1983 by David Johnston as a part of the Sydney Christian Life Centre (founded by Frank Houston in 1977). Located at Arncliffe, the college was then known as the "International Institute for Creative Ministries" (IICM). The curriculum's focus was the creative arts and students' work in the performing and visual arts included secular as well as religious themes.

=== 1990s split ===
In 1989 Johnston parted ways with IICM, bringing the organisation under the auspices of Wesley Mission and the college moved to the Wesley Centre in Pitt Street, Sydney, and after a few name changes became Wesley Institute. The qualifications issued were Advanced Ministry Certificate, Diploma in Creative Ministries, Diploma in Ministry and Diploma in Missiology, and during this time many of the students came from overseas.

In 1990, in a split from the Wesleyan college, Robert Fergusson became principal at the Sydney location and switched the focus to practical ministry training. Classes, at this time accommodating around 50-70 students, were moved back to the church site and the name changed to Aquila College of Ministries in 1993. In 1999, Hills Christian Life Centre merged with Sydney Christian Life Centre, referred to as its "parent church" (Hills being founded by Frank Houston's son, Brian Houston) and changed its name to Hillsong Church. In 2000 the college merged with Hillsong International Leadership College, becoming its "City campus", with Duncan Corby appointed Principal.

Government accreditation was granted to Wesley Institute in 1992, allowing students to be paid Abstudy and Austudy support payments.

=== Move to Drummoyne and expansion ===
Under the supervision of then Wesley Mission Superintendent Gordon Moyes AC, Wesley Institute moved to Drummoyne location in October 1994, transforming the old Drummoyne Boys School into a fully-equipped campus for tertiary education. In 1996 it became part of the Sydney College of Divinity (SCD), the college expanded and in its master's and doctorate degrees were accredited in 1999 and 2001 respectively.

The college was incorporated as Wesley College in 2005 and opened a second campus on Pitt Street, Sydney in 2006 for teaching in Korean. It withdrew from the SCD and in 2007 was given accreditation for a number of degrees in its own right.

On 4 October 2013, the board of trustees for Indiana Wesleyan University voted to acquire Wesley Institute, to create the IWU's first international campus.

== Present name and location ==
In early 2015, Wesley Institute changed its name to Excelsia College.

In 2016, the college relocated to Macquarie Park, New South Wales.

In late 2024, TEQSA registered Excelsia College as a university college.

In August 2025, Excelsia University College moved into a new campus on Pennant Hills.

== People ==
Faculty included Grenville Kent.
