= City of Faith Church =

Coordinates: 51°32′20.38″N 0°4′5.74″E

- City of Faith Church
- Location: London
- Country: England
- Denomination: Pentecostal

Architecture
- Years built: 25 May 1935

Administration
- Diocese: Lewisham

City of Faith Church (Jubilee International Church) is a multi-cultural church in South London situated in the London Borough of Lewisham which has faced local opposition. From 1996 until 2015, the congregation was a church in fellowship with the Assemblies of God in Great Britain, a worldwide Pentecostal denomination. The church is part of a network of local and international branches.

== Historic building ==
In recent years, the church used a building on Mayeswood Road in the Grove Park Estate which was built in 1935. During the 1920s, Lewisham Council determined that as the estate was being developed, it should also include a church. Mr Frederick E Pinkess, who had been running a mobile Sunday school in the community decided to apply for permission to get a church built. He believed that the area had potential for a viable parish. With the help of the Shaftesbury Society, which was affiliated to the Baptist Church, Mr Pinkess raised enough money to build a church which was completed in May 1935. It was a non-denominational place of worship called Grove Park Mission and served as a mercy ministry to the poor. In the 1930s and 1940s, the church had an outreach programme in the community especially amongst the children, which led to a Sunday school. Outreaches included opening-air singing and playing hymns along the local residential streets while carrying around the heavy church organ for music. There were regular open air outreaches every Sunday afternoon and evening for many years.

In 1947, the work was connected with the Free Church movement which was of the Plymouth Brethren movement. Then from 1961, Pastor Gordon Thomson who was connected to Honor Oak Christian Fellowship became the long-term pastor of the congregation called The Christian Fellowship. A local branch of Operation Mobilisation was also instrumental in helping with this work.

In 1987, Book Aid began to lease space in the building from The Christian Fellowship, and then in 2006 the building began to be used by City of Faith Church who had migrated from Southwest London. Pastor Thomson said they were thankful to see the church building once again being used by a new congregation. He and his wife both died within a month of each other in 2007. The church moved out of the building in 2015 into alternative premises.

== Opposition ==
The church came into the media spotlight in the summer of 2006 following serious controversy with local residents in the area and heated dialogues with the local council, London Borough of Lewisham regarding planning consent. Following a favourable decision by the council regarding planning usage, this issue eventually culminated in racist arson attacks against the church. When asked about feelings of animosity towards the perpetrators, the church leader, Dr Femi Olowo, told the press that 'it's part of Christianity to expect persecution and Jesus said love your neighbours and bless those who persecute you. But in fighting us, they are fighting against God. Nobody can fight God and win'.

There were continuing minor attacks and opposition for almost two years which almost forced the church to relocate. They opted instead to persist and the problems settled after about 18 months.

== Community initiatives ==
Having recently gone through an identity change, the church presently claims to be bucking the trend amongst black majority churches by focusing more on community initiatives than purely on Sunday worship activities. They are launching a free money management and debt counselling service to those in need with training and support from national organisations such as Christians Against Poverty (CAP) and Credit Action UK. The church contends that when more people in the community improve in their financial management and reduce their debt, it promotes greater economic wellbeing in the society at large. Consequently, their objective is to relieve sickness and financial hardship through education, counselling, support and such efforts.

A second initiative is that of distributing essential food supplies locally through a Food bank to help those in a state of hardship during times of economic downturn. They have been receiving guidance, training and support from organisations like Trussell Trust and Living Waters Christian Centre. The BBC recently reported that 'thousands of welfare claimants are being referred to Food banks by Job Centre staff over concerns they have not got enough money to eat'. Close to a hundred free hampers are always distributed free to residents in the local community every Christmas, a trend which is increasing amongst UK churches.

A further enterprise is that of providing classes on health, wellbeing and family life skills in order to try to educate people on maintaining good health and healthy family values. The aim is to run free seminars on wellness covering subjects like the dynamics of healthy living and HIV/AIDS awareness. In addition to utilising resources from 'Care for the Family', they have been receiving training and support from Public Health Lewisham.

== Leadership ==
- 1992–present - Dr Femi Olowo (General Overseer)
- 1994-1995 - Rev Josephine Abundance (Assistant Pastor)
- 1996-1999 - Pastor Oheneba Cofie (Associate Pastor)
- 2001-2007 - Dr Akwasi Poku-Nyantekyi (Associate Pastor)
- 2004-2007 - Rev Dr Lloyd Manyangadze (UK General Secretary)

== Some Church Plants ==
- Jubilee House of Prayer Exousia, Ilford, Essex (Pastor Morella Wilton) 2001
- Jubilee International Christian Centre, Accra, Ghana (Rev William Evadzi) 2001
- Jubilee Revival Chapel International, Welwyn Garden City (Rev Dr Lloyd Manyangadze) 2002
- Jubilee International Church, Ndola, Zambia (Rev Lovewell Mwansa) 2002
- Jubilee City of Faith Church, Mufulira, Zambia (Rev Oliver Mutantabowa) 2002
- Jubilee International Church, City of Joy, Peckham (Pastor Ibrahim Sillah) 2009
