= Adelaide College of Ministries =

Defunct Bible college in Australia

- Type: Private bible college
- Active: 1982–2016
- Affiliations: Interdenominational
- Location: 18a Fourth Ave, Klemzig, South Australia 5087; 34°52′38.14″S 138°38′20.53″E

Adelaide College of Ministries was an evangelical, interdenominational Bible college, operating in the period 1982 to 2017. It was located in the suburb of Klemzig in Adelaide, South Australia on the site of closed Klemzig Primary School.

The college offered a 1-year Diploma and a 3-year Bachelor of Ministries degree. ACM was accredited by the Tertiary Education Quality and Standards Agency.

At its closure existing students were transferred to the Bible College of South Australia with full credit.

The property on which the college was located was gradually redeveloped with the remaining allotment redeveloped in 2019.
