= Timberline Church =

Church in Colorado, United States

- Timberline Church
- 40.547590°N 105.037791°W
- Address: Fort Collins, Colorado
- Country: United States
- Denomination: Assemblies of God
- Website: www.timberlinechurch.org

History
- Founded: 1921

Timberline Church is a Pentecostal megachurch located in Fort Collins, Colorado and Windsor, Colorado, that is affiliated with the Assemblies of God USA.

== History ==
Timberline Church was established around 1921 and moved to a larger facility on Timberline Road in Fort Collins, Colorado in the early 2000s. It was previously known as First Assembly of God. Senior Pastor Dary Northrop started in 1986 when the church had 125 people, and now there are close to 6,000 members. Northrop retired on April 27, 2025. On May 31, 2025, Aaron Hanson was introduced as the final candidate for the vacant senior pastor position.

== Description ==
Services are at multiple times in multiple locations, as well as online. A Christian rock band with multiple instrumentalists and harmonizing vocals typically play several songs before a sermon and at the end.

== Philosophy ==
The motto of Timberline church is "Let Love Live".

== Neighbors ==
The Church has collaborated with Colorado State University to improve affordable housing opportunities for students. The Fort Collins Symphony performed in the Timberline Church as part of their 2022 Summer Festival.
