= Bayside Church =

Coordinates: 35°57′35.2″S 145°04′29″E

Bayside Church is an Australia church in fellowship with Crosslink Christian Network. The church is based in the Melbourne Bayside suburbs of Cheltenham and Frankston. The church’s founding senior pastors are Rob and Christie Buckingham.

Whilst the headquarters of Bayside Church is in Cheltenham, the church is multi-location, with a congregation in Frankston also. In 2011, new premises were established in Carrum Downs which is located in the Frankston municipality(this closed in 2021).

== History ==
In June 1992, Rob Buckingham started Bayside Church at WD Rose & Sons Funeral Chapel in Cheltenham. After a year, the church moved into a hall at Cheltenham Primary School. By 1994 a third move was made and Mentone Secondary College became Bayside’s home for seven years. During this time Bayside Church consisted of 300 congregational members.

In 1999, a printing factory in Cheltenham was purchased and building plans began for Bayside Church's permanent residence. The Bayside Centre opened in August 2000, home of Bayside Church Cheltenham location.

Bayside Church continued to grow to incorporate three services - Saturday night, Sunday morning and Sunday evening. In November 2005, a new location in Frankston opened kick-starting the vision of multi-locations in the Bayside suburbs.

== Media ==
In 2002, a media production arm of Bayside Church was born. Bayside Media produces an engaging TV show "The Exchange". The Exchange is broadcast on C31 Melbourne, Australian Christian Channel as well as internationally on United Kingdom’s UCB. www.theexchangetv.com.au

== Beliefs ==
Bayside Church is a non-denominational Pentecostal church which is affiliated with Crosslink Christian Network, an Australian based group of Churches and Christian Ministries. The Church’s beliefs are evangelical and Pentecostal in that they "wholeheartedly" believe that the Bible is the inspired, infallible and authoritative written Word of God (2 Tim 3:16; 2 Peter 1:19-21). They also hold that there is one God, eternally existent in three persons, God the Father, God the Son, and God the Holy Spirit (Matt 28:19; 2 Cor 13:14), and that Jesus Christ, as the son of God, reconciled humanity through his death and resurrection and that everyone is invited to accept this gift of salvation. The Church also believes that salvation can only take place with the regenerative work of the Holy Spirit and that the baptism of the Holy Spirit is given to believers who ask. The Holy Spirit also gives supernatural gifts to believers.
