= Garywood Assembly of God =

Large church in Hueytown, Alabama, United States

Coordinates: 33.45227°N 86.97652°W

Garywood Assembly of God is a large church in Hueytown, Alabama; a western suburb of Birmingham. It is affiliated with the Assemblies of God.

== Founding ==
Garywood Assembly was founded in 1947 during a tent crusade by evangelist Dorine Justice. The church began with just fourteen members. Dorine Justice served as pastor for the first year, between 1950 and 1979 there were eleven different pastors, during which time church growth was slow. In 1979, Pastor John A. Loper, then an official with the Alabama District of the Assemblies of God, accepted the pastorate. During this time the church's radio outreach, Garywood Alive, was aired. This soon evolved into a television outreach as well.

On October 7, 2012, Pastor Loper announced that he would retire on February 11, 2013, one week after he would celebrate the 35th anniversary of his coming to Garywood. On February 3, 2013, Pastor Jeff Leatherman was elected as Lead Pastor of Garywood.

== Annual events ==
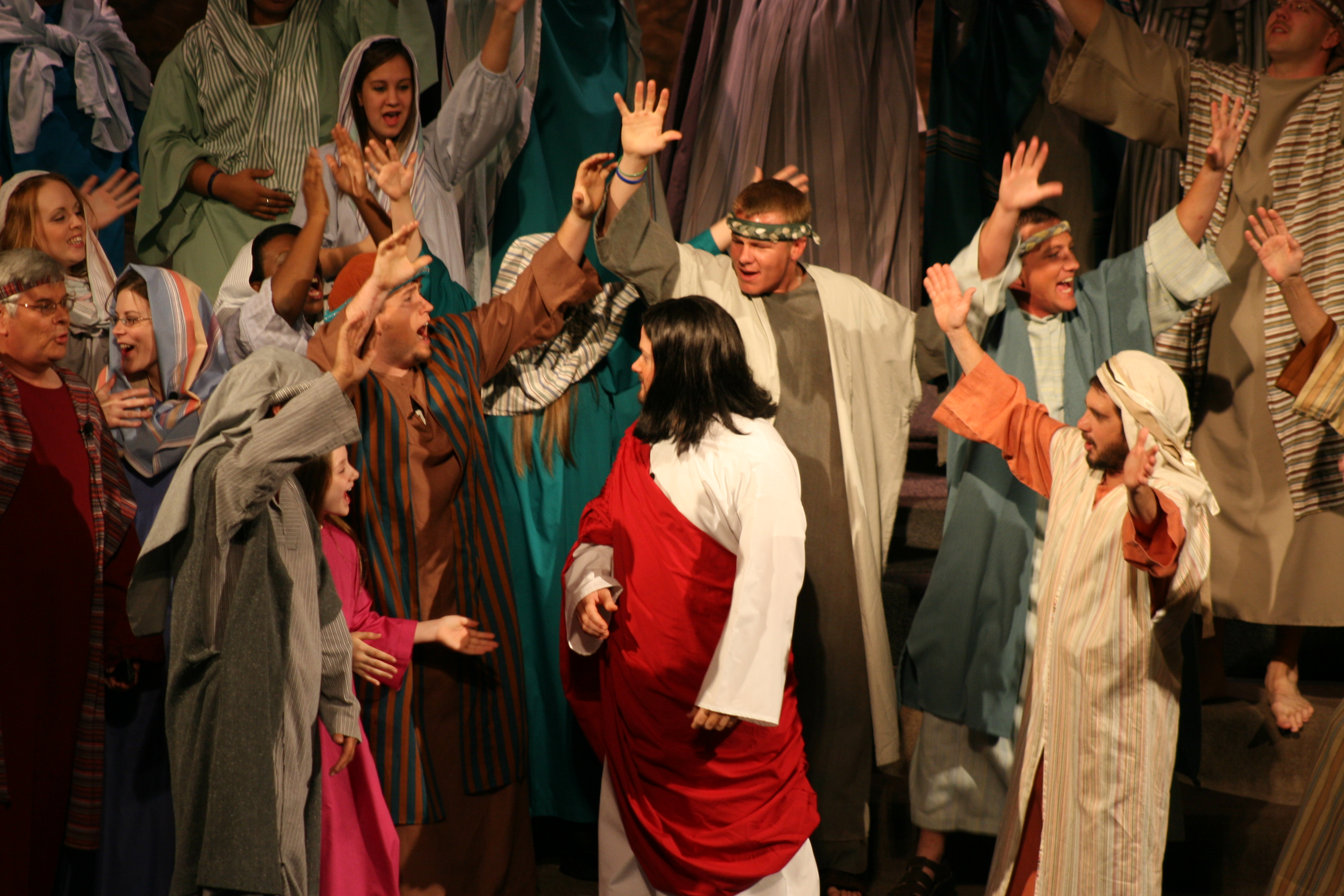
A scene from the 2007 performance of Garywood's annual Easter drama

The church is known throughout metro Birmingham for its annual Easter Drama, which began in 1977 and was produced each year through 2004, and again in 2006 before being discontinued. The church also hosted an annual Garywood Campmeeting, which for many years was billed as the largest "spiritual gathering" in Alabama, featuring well-known figures Vestal Goodman, Marvin Gorman, Jesse Duplantis and John Kilpatrick (of Brownsville Revival fame).

== Property acquisitions ==
In 2003 Garywood's congregation overwhelmingly voted to buy property on I-459 near McCalla, Alabama, for relocation. Original plans included a 2,500-seat state-of-the-art auditorium, large facilities for youth, children's ministry and greatly expanded capacity for Garywood Christian School. However, the church sold the property to Colonial Properties Trust in 2006, and is using the proceeds of the sale to build a new facility approximately one mile away from the first site. Groundbreaking for the new facility, just off Charles Hamilton Road and Old Tuscaloosa Road, took place on November 18, 2007. Construction of the new facility was scheduled to begin in January 2008 and be completed sometime in 2009.

Because of the ongoing economic situation, the move has been delayed, and new construction has not begun.
