= Hillsong Church =

Global megachurch network headquartered in Australia

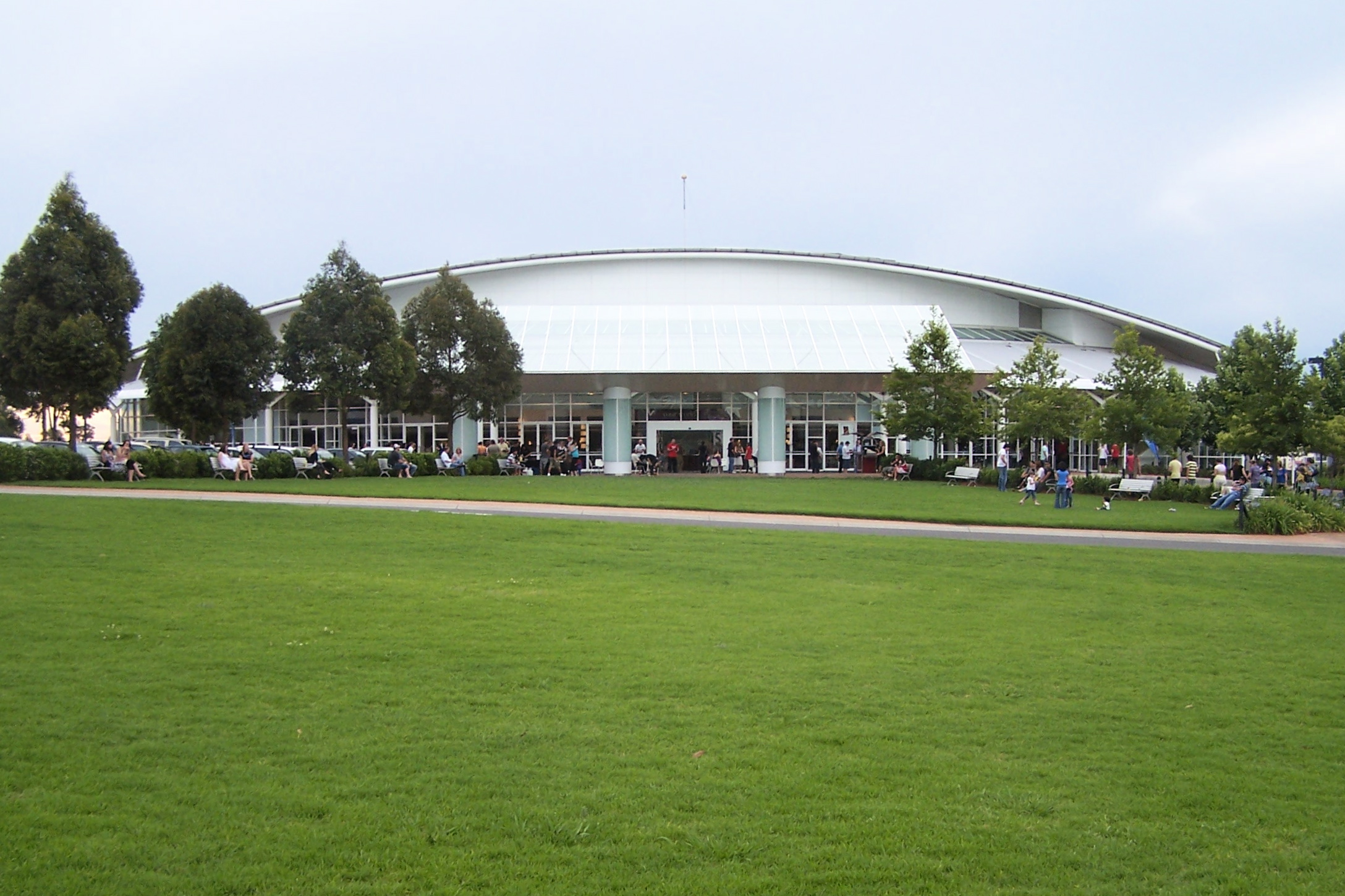
- Hillsong Convention Centre in the Norwest Business Park
- Hillsong Church
- Country: Australia
- Website: hillsong.com

History
- Founded: 1983; 43 years ago
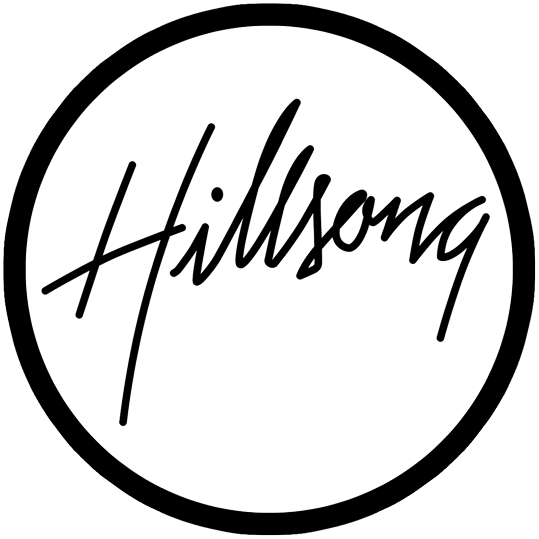

Hillsong Church
- Theology: Charismatic
- Polity: Independent
- Structure: Hillsong Global Board, Hillsong Eldership
- Headquarters: Baulkham Hills, New South Wales, Australia
- Founder: Brian Houston and Bobbie Houston
- Aid organization: Hillsong City Care
- Tax status: Charitable institution

Hillsong Church, commonly known as Hillsong, is a Pentecostal Christian megachurch and a Christian association of churches based in Australia. The original church was established in Baulkham Hills, New South Wales, as Hills Christian Life Centre by Brian Houston and his wife, Bobbie Houston, in 1983. Hillsong was a member of the Australian Christian Churches – the Australian branch of the US-based Assemblies of God – until 2018, when it separated to form a new denomination. The church is known for its contemporary worship music, with groups such as Hillsong Worship, Hillsong United and Hillsong Young & Free with many musical credits and hits charting all over the world.

Hillsong and its music have been highly successful globally, with its presence described as a global corporate brand. However, a series of scandals and criticisms have negatively affected its image in recent years. In March 2022, Houston stepped down as global senior pastor after an internal investigation found that he had breached the church's moral code of conduct for pastors by engaging in inappropriate behaviour with women on two occasions in the 2010s. In February 2023, Phil and Lucinda Dooley, who had been acting in the position since January 2022, took over as global senior pastors.

== History ==
Early Hills Christian Life Centre logo

=== Beginnings: 1977–1999 ===
In 1977, six years before the establishment of what would become Hillsong Church, Brian Houston's father Frank founded the Sydney Christian Life Centre (Sydney CLC) in Waterloo, New South Wales, in inner-city Sydney, in what was described by scholar Sam Hey as "a neo-Pentecostal megachurch". Brian Houston and his wife, Bobbie, started holding services at a school hall in Baulkham Hills, establishing Hills Christian Life Centre (Hills CLC) in 1983. Both Sydney CLC and Hills CLC were affiliated with the Australian Christian Churches (ACC), the Australian branch of the US-based Assemblies of God.

Hills CLC's growth into a megachurch through the 1980s and 1990s was largely driven by young people attracted by its contemporary worship music, and by its practice of planting churches internationally. In 1992, Hills CLC planted London Christian Life Centre as an independent church, with Gerard and Sue Keehan as pastors; it was renamed Hillsong London in 2000 and gradually grew to twelve locations across the United Kingdom. Kyiv Christian Life Centre, now Hillsong Kyiv, was also planted in newly independent Ukraine in 1992.

In 1997, Hills CLC moved into a new building at Baulkham Hills' Norwest Business Park. The church merged with Sydney CLC in May 1999, after Frank Houston had been exposed as a paedophile. Brian Houston became senior pastor of both churches for eighteen months. The multi-campus church was renamed Hillsong Church in 2001.

=== 21st century ===
Between 2008 and 2018, Hillsong Church established more churches in Russia, South Africa, Sweden, Israel, Canada and Mexico. Hillsong also branched out into the United States, establishing sixteen locations by 2022.

In September 2018, Hillsong left the Australian Christian Churches—of which Brian Houston had been national superintendent/president from 1997 to 2009—to become an autonomous denomination, identifying itself more as a global and charismatic church. According to both Hillsong and ACC, the parting was amicable. Of the decision to spin itself off into its own denomination, Houston wrote, "We do not intend to function as a denomination in the traditional sense of the word... We are a denomination purely for practical reasons related to having the ability to ordain our pastors in Australia to legally conduct weddings as marriage celebrants operating under the rites of Hillsong Church". Houston added that they had not shifted doctrinally and that the ACC was still their "tribe". In 2018, it had 80 churches.

In October 2020, Hillsong purchased the Festival Hall venue in Melbourne to become the home of Hillsong Church Melbourne City's weekly church services after undergoing renovations to better suit the new uses.

In October 2021, Hillsong bought the Golders Green Hippodrome in London, England, with the intention of holding Sunday services there.

Houston resigned his chairmanship of the Hillsong board in September 2021, owing to the pressures of a court case relating to his alleged failure to report sexual abuse of a child by his father, of which he became aware in the 1990s. In January 2022, Houston announced that he was temporarily stepping down from church leadership for this reason and introduced new leaders Phil and Lucinda Dooley. Then in March 2022, following revelations of misconduct complaints by two women, he permanently stepped down from church leadership. Two weeks after this scandal, 9 of the 16 Hillsong Churches in the United States announced their decisions to leave the Hillsong global network.

In August 2022, Hillsong was sued by an Australian whistleblower in federal court there, alleging that the megachurch had moved millions of dollars overseas to avoid the charities regulator, the Australian Charities and Not-for-profits Commission (ACNC). The whistleblower alleged that Hillsong made "large cash gifts" to Houston and his family using tax-free money.

In August 2023, Brian Houston was acquitted of covering up his father's crimes.

== Statistics ==
According to a census published by the association in 2024, it had 28 churches in Australia and in 27 countries.

Hillsong had 100,000 people in 14 countries in September 2015,increasing to 130,000 people in 21 countries in 2019.

Due to the impact of the COVID-19 pandemic in 2020, the church started measuring online attendees instead of regular attendees, which they stated average 444,000 per weekend.

== Branding ==
Hillsong has been described as a "global corporate brand" and "Australia's most powerful brand", with its global growth assisted by the spectacle of conferences, music releases, Hillsong Television, its messaging and language, customer service, presence on social media, and merchandising.

== Governance ==
The church is governed by the Hillsong Global Board and a group of elders known as the Hillsong Eldership, headed by Pastors Phil and Lucinda Dooley since 2022. The elders lead the church spiritually, whereas the board of directors manages the corporate administration appointed for one year, with renewable terms.

The founders, Brian and Bobbie Houston, had been the global senior pastors of Hillsong Church. On 31 January 2022, it was announced that Phil and Lucinda Dooley, pastors of the South African church, would be acting global senior pastors in Houston's absence until the end of 2022, after Brian Houston stepped down owing to the pressures of a court case relating to his alleged failure to report sexual abuse by his father, of which he was later acquitted.

Brian Houston was also chairman of the board, until his resignation from this position in January 2022. Since 2021, the chairman of the Hillsong Global board is Steve Crouch. He is the husband of long-term pastor Donna Crouch and former accountant to the church. George Aghajanian is general manager as well as a director of Hillsong Church Australia and its international entities.

In March 2022, Brian Houston resigned from the board of Hillsong Church and from his role as global senior pastor as a result of breaching the moral code of the church in his behaviour with two women.

== Locations and ministries ==
Hillsong has a global presence, with churches and ministries in Australia, Indonesia, Philippines and Japan, many European countries, Canada, US, South Africa, and, in Latin America, Argentina, Brazil, Mexico, and Uruguay as of February 2022.

Hillsong's various ministries include Hillsong Music, Hillsong Kids, Hillsong Youth, Hillsong Sisterhood, Hillsong Men, Hillsong Conference, Hillsong CityCare, Hillsong International Leadership College, TBN Inspire (branded as Hillsong Channel from June 2016 to 31 December 2021), TV & Film, Hillsong Performing Arts Academy and Hillsong Health Centre. Their total facilities are estimated to be worth around A$100 million.

=== Hillsong College ===
Two campuses of the Hillsong International Leadership College arose from the two churches that are now Hillsong Church, the Sydney Christian Life Centre and Hills Christian Life Centre. Both original colleges had similar goals of creating courses in ministry and leadership development based in a local church setting. With an emphasis on the creative arts, theological education was based on the ministry model.

The Sydney college was originally founded in 1983 by David Johnston and located at Arncliffe as the "International Institute for Creative Ministries" (IICM), but in 1989 Johnston parted ways with IICM, bringing the college under the auspices of Wesley Mission. That college moved to the Wesley Centre in Pitt Street, Sydney, and after a few name changes became Wesley Institute (now Excelsia College).

In 1988, Hills Christian Life Centre developed a training arm of IICM, under Ian Fuller. It was first known as Power Ministry School, then in 1992 Power Ministry College, under Steve Kelly. In 1993 the Hillsong School and a School of Music was established to train young musicians. In 1996, after Mark Hopkins took over as director, the Hillsong School and the School of Music were merged to form the Hills Leadership College.

In 1990, Robert Fergusson became principal at the Sydney location and switched the focus to practical ministry training. Classes, at this time accommodating around 50-70 students, were moved back to the church site and the name changed to Aquila College of Ministries in 1993. After Hills CLC merged with Sydney CLC (referred to as its "parent church") in 1999, in early 2000 the Sydney college merged with the Hills Leadership College to become Hillsong International Leadership College, with Duncan Corby appointed principal of its "City campus". It was approved as a registered training organisation in December 2002, and by 2007 there were around 900 full-time students enrolled across the two campuses, the majority from overseas.

In February 2016, Duncan Corby was dean of the college, while Catrina Henderson was principal. and it was still trading as Hillsong International Leadership College. In late 2016 it shortened its name to simply Hillsong College, and as of 2022 has campuses in Sydney and Phoenix, Arizona, and has an online curriculum. The official trading name of the city campus is Sydney Christian Life Centre Pty Ltd, and one of its tax-deductible charitable funds is called the International Institute for Creative Ministries Library Trust Fund.

=== Hillsong Sisterhood ===
Bobbie Houston has been especially influential in Hillsong's ministry for women, called Sisterhood. She is a mentor to many of Hillsong's women leaders. Although Hillsong generally supports the traditional roles of wife and mother for women, the church's position is that their ministries "empower" women. Riches found via interviews with attendees that the ministries increased women's choice regarding around sexuality and child rearing; encouraged women to start small businesses and to take on promotions at work; facilitated women's participation in cultural events, as well as promoted women's voices in religious teaching and public life. Church members have described Hillsong's leadership development as a process that supports women's movement from timid, supportive wife into leadership roles within the church. The Sisterhood is involved in issues such as HIV/AIDS, domestic violence and human trafficking. Their midweek gathering is primarily for women. It is attended by all female staff members and is the foundation of Hillsong's women's ministries. The Thursday meeting for mothers includes businesswomen, and special quarterly "Sisterhood United" night meetings include working women. Members of the church say that her authority as a leader comes from "a Pentecostal understanding of Spirit empowerment".

=== Australia ===
Hillsong has multiple campuses around Australia. As of February 2022, in New South Wales it has Baulkham Hills, two Sydney city campuses (one the location of the original Sydney CLC), several around various suburbs, and one each in Newcastle and Wollongong. There are also one or two churches in major cities in all of the other states except for South Australia, which has monthly gatherings in Adelaide. It also has churches in 30 countries across the world, and as of February 2022 reports 150,000 regular attendees globally.

==== Avalon Theatre ====
Hillsong purchased the heritage-listed Avalon Theatre in Hobart, Tasmania, for $2.55 million in 2020. The theatre underwent renovations in 2022.

==== Hillsong CityCare ====
In 1986, a social engagement program called CityCare was established in New South Wales, offering various community services including personal development programs, counselling services, a health centre and youth mentoring. CityCare's "street teams" worked within the community to care for, feed and clothe the homeless.

In July 2008, concerns were raised by some teachers, parents, and experts about the Hillsong City Care Shine program for girls being run in New South Wales public schools, community groups and the juvenile justice system. The concerns include that the program is "inappropriate for troubled young women, that the under-qualified facilitators are reinforcing gender stereotypes and that some parents have not been properly informed" and that "the program encourages girls to be subservient by teaching them that they need to be attractive to men". Hillsong claimed that parents were supportive and that the program broke down barriers in a group situation. In a further response, Hillsong denied that the program had been used for evangelism, but a teacher's federation representative insisted that children had been exposed to religious content, such as people relating stories about finding religion and joining the Hillsong Church.

== Beliefs ==
Hillsong was formerly affiliated with Australian Christian Churches (the Assemblies of God in Australia), part of Pentecostal Christianity. The church's beliefs are evangelical and charismatic.

Hillsong's positions on non-central doctrines of the faith are diverse, although individuals have taken a public stand on many topical issues in contemporary Christianity in keeping with mainstream Pentecostalism; for example, the church's founder opposes abortion and supports teaching creationism in schools. Hillsong has also declared support for Creationism and Intelligent Design and believes this should be taught in schools.

Hillsong's prosperity teachings have been criticised by Christian leaders Tim Costello and Cardinal George Pell. Subsequent statements by Costello indicated that he was satisfied with changes made by Brian Houston to Hillsong's teaching in response to criticism. Costello also wrote a foreword to Hillsong's 2019 annual report. Hillsong's teachings have been commented on favourably by Peter Costello, Tim Costello's brother, also a Baptist and a former Treasurer of Australia, who has defended the church against accusations of unorthodoxy.

== Media and events ==
=== Music ===
Hillsong has been described by popular music scholar Tom Wagner as a "confluence of sophisticated marketing techniques and popular music". The music of Hillsong United and Hillsong Worship are credited with driving Hillsong's global popularity. Through the 1980s and 1990s, the congregation grew from 45 members to nearly 20,000 and emerged as a significant influence in the area of contemporary worship music. This was a result of strategic marketing that targeted younger generations and Hillsong's success at establishing itself as a global music standard.

Hillsong Church has produced over 40 albums, which have sold over 11 million copies. Albums are produced for different target audiences including Hillsong Kids for children. Hillsong Chapel features acoustic arrangements, which are "quieter" than the electric guitar, keyboard and drums that are typical of Hillsong's music. Hillsong's albums are produced by Hillsong Music Australia. Hillsong's congregational music has been the dominant source of the church's influence in the Charismatic Christianity movement.

Music is central to worship at the church. Hillsong's worship leaders have generally enjoyed a high-profile international position. Early worship leaders included Geoff Bullock and Darlene Zschech. Zschech was Hillsong's second worship leader, and Hillsong achieved international acclaim during her ministry. Zschech's "Shout to the Lord" was an early hit for Hillsong in the mid-1990s. In 2008, Reuben Morgan became Hillsong's third worship leader.

Hillsong's worship music has been widely influential not only in Pentecostal churches, but more broadly in Evangelical churches. Many of Hillsong's "worship expressions" have been incorporated into Evangelical services including raised hands, vocal utterance and dance. Hillsong Music has released over 40 albums since 1992, many of them achieving gold status in Australia and one of them, People Just Like Us, achieving platinum status. The church's 2004 live praise and worship album For All You've Done reached No. 1 in the mainstream Australian album charts (ARIA).

In September 2012, Hillsong produced The Global Project, a collection of their most popular songs released in nine different languages including Spanish, Portuguese, Korean, Mandarin, Indonesian, German, French, Swedish and Russian.

==== Hillsong Worship ====
The Hillsong Worship albums, formerly led by Darlene Zschech and Reuben Morgan and previously named Hillsong Live before 2014, all achieved gold status in Australia. The live album series was recorded at the Sydney campus(es) and then edited and produced by Hillsong Music Australia. The worship series began as a compilation of songs and developed into studio recorded albums. To help make Hillsong Music mainstream, an agreement with Warner Music Australia took place in 1999. In 2003, Sony Music Australia also signed with Hillsong Music to make the group even more mainstream. In 2018, Hillsong Worship won its first Grammy Award for Best Contemporary Christian Music Performance/Song for "What a Beautiful Name".

==== Hillsong United ====
Hillsong United was conceived as the youth arm of the worship ministry, producing annual live albums similarly to Hillsong Live, with a focus on alternative rock. As the members grew older, United has since transitioned into a band with currently an eleven-member fixed lineup of Hillsong musicians as well as a focus on studio albums compared to the Worship and Young & Free ministries. Their song "Oceans (Where Feet May Fail)" was No. 1 on the Billboard Hot Christian Songs list for a full year. It was the No. 1 song on the Billboard Christian Songs chart in 2014 and 2016, No. 2 for 2015, and the No. 1 song of the 2010s decade. The New York Times described their music as "ornate mainstream arena rock but with God-only lyrics that are vetted for adherence to theology". Joel Houston, Hillsong's creative director and former lead pastor of Hillsong New York, leads Hillsong United.

==== Hillsong Young & Free ====
Hillsong Young & Free was established in 2012 as a new youth branch of Hillsong's ministry. Hillsong Church has been successful at adjusting the musical style of their ministries to keep up with changing musical trends. Hillsong Young & Free was launched to attract postmillennial youth worshippers. The style of music in this particular ministry reflects features of musical genres that are popular with this target demographic, including electronic dance music. Laura Toggs and Peter Toganivalu were founders of the collective, while Toggs was also one of the vocalists of Young & Free prior to her resignation from Hillsong in 2023.

==== Hillsong Kids ====
Hillsong Kids is music designed for and by Hillsong's children's ministry. The albums Jesus Is My Superhero and Super Strong God were included on Natalie Gillespie's "Best Christian Children's Albums" lists for 2005 and 2006, respectively (published in Christianity Today).

=== Television ===
In late March 2022, Network 10 removed Hillsong-produced television programs from its schedules and video on demand service 10Play. The removal came amid controversies involving Brian Houston, who resigned from his position as senior pastor after being indicted in a misconduct investigation by the ministry. Since then, Brian Houston has announced through X, formerly known as Twitter, that he would be launching a new church in 2024. This would consist of weekly services through an online platform.

=== Hillsong Channel ===
On 9 March 2016, Trinity Broadcasting Network (TBN), the American religious broadcaster, announced a partnership with Hillsong that saw TBN's digital terrestrial television (DTT) sub-channel, The Church Channel, rebranded as the broadcast version of Hillsong Channel on 1 June 2016. The American linear channel was rebranded as TBN Inspire on 1 January 2022, and the international versions followed suit in April 2022, though Hillsong remained a partner in the network. Due to the scandals associated with Brian Houston in relation to Hillsong Church, TBN removed Hillsong Channel from their network. It has since been replaced by similar Christian content. In substitute to the channel, they will be providing non-pulpit teachings, worship programs, documentary, and a one-hour flagship program.

=== Hillsong Conference ===
Hillsong Conference 2021 logo

Hillsong Conference is a mid-year week long annual conference in Sydney, London and New York City each year. First started in 1986, it has grown to be the largest annual conference in Australia as of January 2022.

The Australian conference is hosted by Hillsong Church and lead pastors Brian and Bobbie Houston and involves a variety of guests from across the globe. Baptist minister Michael Frost described the 2011 conference as having, "a kind of electric, almost carnival atmosphere ... the delegates were full of anticipation and excitement".

In 2014, the New York event was held in Madison Square Garden, while the London conference was held in The O2 Arena over three days and has continued to be held at this venue until at least 2018.

== Media appearances ==
On 16 September 2016, the documentary Hillsong: Let Hope Rise, directed by Michael John Warren, was released to cinemas across the United States. The film had gone through two other media companies, Warner Bros. and Relativity Media. It was set to be released the year prior in April, but had complications with the distribution rights. The film was picked up by Pure Flix Entertainment and released the following year. The documentary explores Hillsong's beginnings and its rise to prominence as an international church. The focus is on the band Hillsong United as they write songs for their upcoming album and work toward a performance at The Forum in Inglewood, California.

In 2022–2023, various programs charting the rise and demise of Hillsong were aired on a number of media platforms. In March 2022, Discovery+ released a documentary series, Hillsong: A Megachurch Exposed, revealing the allegations related to child-sex crimes, marital affairs, and the mishandling of money given from the congregants to the church. In March 2023, satirical news outlet The Betoota Advocate partnered with Paramount to release a new satirical series on TV which would include an episode about Hillsong. The Herald Sun produced an investigative podcast called Faith on Trial. In June of that year, ex-Hillsong member Marc Fennell presented The Kingdom on SBS Television.

=== FX: The Secrets of Hillsong ===
On 19 May 2023, Hulu released a four-part documentary series, The Secrets of Hillsong, across the United States and Australia, in association to Vanity Fair. The series was directed by Stacy Lee and produced by Scout Productions and Vanity Fair Studios. The four episodes speak on a variety of topics regarding various scandals related to Hillsong Church, specifically in the United States and Australia. Throughout the series, there are conversations and interviews with former congregants, journalists, and former pastors Carl Lentz and Laura Lentz.

The show begins with an introduction of the former pastor Carl Lentz and his process of creating a revival in the city of New York through their new location, Hillsong NYC, that opened on 17 October 2010. The church quickly evolved into a megachurch and started attracting various big-name celebrities like Justin Bieber, the Kardashian-Jenner family, Selena Gomez, Vanessa Hudgens, Kyrie Irving, and Jay-Z. In 2020, the church's reputation began declining, and people began speaking out about their experience in the Hillsong Church, along with Carl Lentz's Instagram post about being unfaithful to his wife of 17 years. Among the troubles at Hillsong, former congregants reported allegations of racism, sexual abuse, homophobia, and being taken advantage of when offering their services for free to help the church.

Towards the end of the documentary series, viewers learn that Frank Houston, the man who founded Sydney Christian Life Centre, had been involved in a series of acts of pedophilia and his son, Pastor Brian Houston, was hiding the crimes of his father. This resulted in Brian Houston being charged with obscuring the truth about his father's past. Brian did not provide any comments regarding this topic to the Vanity Fair producers for the series.

== Political influence ==
Hillsong Church has attracted support from high-profile politicians, especially from the Liberal Party of Australia. In 1998, Brian Houston met with the prime minister of Australia, John Howard, and most of his cabinet at Parliament House in Canberra before sharing prayers. In 2002, Howard opened the Hillsong Convention Centre at the Baulkham Hills location. In 2004 and 2005, the Treasurer of Australia, Peter Costello, spoke at its annual conferences. Mark Latham, the Leader of the Opposition, declined Hillsong's invitation to the 2004 conference, although Bob Carr, the Premier of New South Wales (from the New South Wales Labor Party), attended the 2005 conference.

Liberal MP for Mitchell, Alan Cadman, and two Family First Party senate candidates, Joan Woods and Ivan Herald, who failed to win senate seats, were featured in a Hillsong circular during the election, with members being asked to pray for them.

Hillsong's high-profile involvement with political leaders has been questioned in the media, and publicly, the church has distanced itself from advocating certain political groups and parties, including the fledgling Family First party. Brian Houston has replied to these criticisms by stating, "I think people need to understand the difference between the church being very involved in politics and individual Christians being involved in politics."

In 2008, Sydney inner city publication Central Magazine stated that Hillsong had donated A$600 to a Member of the Legislative Council, Kristina Keneally (ALP), for the tickets of a fundraising dinner, featuring the New South Wales' planning minister, Frank Sartor (ALP), as a guest speaker one month before the 2007 state election, despite Hillsong's own statement of corporate governance declaring that "Hillsong Church does not make financial contributions to or align itself with any political party or candidate." A Hillsong staff member, Maria Ieroianni, said that no donation had been made and that the dinner was not a fundraiser. Hillsong also issued a statement on their website denying that the money was a donation. According to the Central Magazine article, Keneally has described the dinner as a fundraiser and the money from Hillsong as a donation. The article also states that these descriptions are confirmed by the records of the New South Wales Electoral Commission.

Prime Minister Scott Morrison opened the 2019 Hillsong annual conference, shortly after the May 2019 federal election. He is not a member of Hillsong, being part of the Horizon Church's congregation.

== Controversies ==
Hillsong has been criticised by politicians, media, community groups, Christian leaders and former members such as Tanya Levin. Criticisms have included Hillsong's finances, its ties to controversial organisations, its attitudes towards LGBTQ+ people, and its treatment of critics, as well as scandals involving Brian Houston and other prominent church leaders.

=== Finances ===
Criticisms have been levelled at Hillsong in regard to its finances, particularly its use of government grants when it reportedly made A$40 million in 2004, and A$50 million in 2010.

In 2005, Hillsong was accused of spending most of the money it received through government grants for programs to assist the Riverstone Aboriginal Community Association (RACA) on their own staff salaries. The federal government acknowledged that A$80,000 from the grant money had been used to pay Hillsong Emerge CEO Leigh Coleman, who was only indirectly involved in the programs. One program, designed to give microloans to Indigenous Australians, paid A$315,000 to Hillsong staff over the course of a year, though only granted six loans averaging A$2,856 each during that time. Hillsong's application for the grant listed the RACA as a co-funder, though the RACA denied ever offering funding, saying they were never in a position to do so. In 2006, Hillsong were stripped of A$414,000 from the grant on the grounds they had faked the Indigenous endorsement that was required to obtain it. Hillsong were also accused of offering the RACA A$280,000 in order to silence their complaints regarding the matter, which they declined; a Hillsong spokesperson stated the offer of money was "not an attempt to silence RACA but amicably resolve the issue."

Pushes for a charity commission in Australia have stemmed from claims that religious organisations like Hillsong avoid taxes by paying their staff in tax-exempt fringe benefits. In 2010, The Sunday Telegraph reported that the Houston family was enjoying a lavish lifestyle, almost entirely tax-free, including vehicles and expense accounts.

In early 2023, it was announced that 153 staff members accepted voluntary redundancies in 2022, a cost-cutting method that reportedly will save the church close to $10 million. The moves were made following the accusations that the church had been extravagantly spending money and participating in fraud. The move comes alongside an independent review into the church's financial structure.

=== Sexual abuse by founder's father ===
Frank Houston, the father of Hillsong Church founder Brian Houston, was a pastor in New Zealand and Australia who sexually abused boys over the course of his ministry. One of the nine identified victims was routinely subjected to sexual abuse in the 1960s and 1970s when he was 7 to 12 years old. In 1999, his mother reported the abuse to the Assemblies of God denomination. Although Brian Houston, then national president of the Assemblies of God denomination in Australia, was legally obligated to report the crime, he allegedly did not do so. Brian Houston stated that he felt it reasonable not to report the crime when it came to light at the time that the victim was an adult, and when the victim did not want the crime reported (an assertion that was denied by the victim). The victim later testified to the Royal Commission into Institutional Responses to Child Sexual Abuse that Frank Houston offered him AU$10,000 as compensation at a McDonald's in the presence of Nabi Saleh. During an internal church investigation, Frank Houston eventually confessed to the crime. The commission also heard that he was involved in the sexual abuse of other children in New Zealand. Frank Houston resigned from his church in 2000 which, then lacking a pastor, was merged into Hillsong Church. A further internal investigation by the Assemblies of God in Australia, in conjunction with the Assemblies of God in New Zealand, found six additional child sexual abuse allegations that were regarded as credible.

On 5 August 2021, NSW Police issued a warrant for Brian Houston to attend the Downing Centre Local Court in Sydney on 5 October, alleging that Houston concealed child sexual abuse by his late father, Frank. Houston was in the United States at the time of being charged. He has denied the charges and his lawyer stated he intended to plead not guilty. Houston resigned his chairmanship of the Hillsong board in September 2021, as court proceedings were likely to be protracted. In January 2022, Houston announced that he was temporarily stepping down from church leadership for this reason and introduced new leaders Phil and Lucinda Dooley.

In August 2023, Brian Houston was found not guilty of covering up his father's sex crimes.

=== Views on homosexuality ===
The church has been criticised for its stance on homosexuality issues. It considers homosexual practice sinful, and does not allow homosexuals to assume leadership roles. It issued a statement in February 2019 stating that it was inclusive; however, Houston had formerly said that Hillsong would accept those who did not follow a "homosexual lifestyle".

In 2014, Brian Houston discussed being more understanding of homosexuals. Later, he clarified his position after being criticised by some Christians for allegedly supporting homosexuality. In a statement released on Hillsong's website, he stated: "Nowhere in my answer did I diminish biblical truth or suggest that I or Hillsong Church supported gay marriage."

=== Mercy Ministries ===
Hillsong has been criticised for its involvement with Mercy Ministries, an evangelical charity with an anti-abortion view and a conservative perspective on homosexuality. Hillsong responded by praising the work of Mercy Ministries and stating that they "are not involved in the operational aspects of the organisation". The church also said, "We have heard many wonderful testimonies about how the work of Mercy has helped the lives of young women facing often debilitating and life-controlling situations. Some would even say that Mercy Ministries has saved their life [sic]." Mercy Ministries in Australia was shut down on 31 October 2009, citing "extreme financial challenges and a steady drop in [their] support base". Hillsong had distanced itself from the organisation previously despite still funding it, and staffing elements of it.

=== Former members' criticisms ===
Hillsong's attitude towards criticism was portrayed negatively by former member Tanya Levin in her book People in Glass Houses: An Insider's Story of a Life In and Out of Hillsong. Specific criticisms covered authoritarian church governance, lack of financial accountability, resistance to free thought, strict fundamentalist teachings and lack of compassion. In an interview with Andrew Denton, Levin further discussed her experience of Hillsong, which she described as "toxic Christianity".

Many former church members have accused the church of exploiting volunteers, due to overwork, lack of recognition and interference in privacy.

=== Guglielmucci cancer claim scandal ===
On 20 August 2008, Michael Guglielmucci, a then pastor of Planetshakers Church, composed "Healer", a song about his experience of cancer. He was invited by Hillsong to add his song to the album This Is Our God. Later, he confessed that he had lied about having cancer. Hillsong leadership told the press they were unaware of this situation and that the suspended pastor was seeking professional help. The Australian Christian Churches promised that all money donated by listeners inspired by the song would either be returned or donated to charity. "Healer" has since been removed from further releases of the album.

=== Mark Driscoll appearance ===
In 2015, American preacher Mark Driscoll was invited to attend the Hillsong annual conference. When it was revealed that Driscoll had made offensive comments about women, Brian Houston announced that Driscoll would no longer attend the conference. However, a pre-recorded interview with Driscoll was played during the conference.

=== Black Lives Matter movement ===
Gary Clarke, then pastor of Hillsong London, was criticised for refusing to comment on the murder of George Floyd in the US, having said on 30 May 2020, "For me to be railing as a pastor about something that's going on in another country, I'm not really sure that's going to help anyone." Both Clarke and Houston subsequently apologised for the comments and, in early 2021, Clarke and his wife Cathy were moved into an international leadership role. In early June 2020, Hillsong came out in support of Black Lives Matter in the US, with Brian Houston stating that they are "committed as a Church to playing our part in seeing racism eradicated ... until that becomes a reality, we will continue to say black lives matter".

In response to the Black Lives Matter protests, Hillsong held a panel discussion, with members consisting of people of colour of diverse backgrounds who were involved with the church, such as Hillsong Darwin pastor and Aboriginal Australian academic Robyn Ober.

=== Carl Lentz affairs ===
Hillsong pastor Carl Lentz helped to lead Hillsong's first church in the United States, in New York City, in 2010. Lentz became friends with singer Justin Bieber and developed a celebrity following. Hillsong expanded on the East Coast under Lentz, but some members felt that it became unduly focused on fashion, and on servicing the desires of its pastors and its famous patrons. Church volunteers were allegedly expected to work long hours, and were reportedly treated as second-class citizens and gaslighted. Around 2017, two Hillsong volunteers who attempted to convey their concerns about Lentz to Hillsong leadership were allegedly intercepted and dismissed.

In 2020, Hillsong fired Lentz after finding that he had engaged in "more than one extra-marital affair" and was currently involved in one. Lentz's lover stated that Hillsong is not "genuine. That's the truth. It's a money machine ... and I think it's wrong ... I think [Lentz] is a victim of his own church. He gave his life to this church, and that's how they played him."

=== Management of sexual violence ===
In early 2021, Vanity Fair, the Christian Post and News.com.au reported that a female student at Hillsong Leadership College named Anna Crenshaw had been indecently assaulted by a married Hillsong administrator named Jason Mays, the son of the church's director of human resources. In January 2020, Mays had pleaded guilty to indecent assault and received two years probation and mandatory counselling. Though Mays received a 12-month ban from ministry, he was subsequently reinstated to his ministry role and volunteered with singing at worship services. Crenshaw criticised Hillsong's leadership for downplaying the incident and not holding Mays accountable for his actions. Brian Houston subsequently apologised for his Tweet questioning Crenshaw's version of events. That same month, several Hillsong Leadership College students penned a letter criticising the church leadership for allowing Mays to remain on staff despite his indecent assault conviction.

In September 2021, 60 Minutes aired a segment called "Hillsong Hell" featuring Crenshaw and a second woman known as "Katherine", who alleged that she had been raped by a fellow church member on church premises in 2018. Both women alleged that Hillsong had ignored their complaints and tried to downplay the incidents. According to 60 Minutes, Hillsong sees itself as the victim when it is criticised and cares more about protecting itself than investigating accusations, noting that Mays had pleaded guilty to assaulting Crenshaw yet retained his job at Hillsong. Brian Houston subsequently posted a Twitter message questioning Crenshaw's version of events and also gave an interview with Eternity magazine portraying the church as the victim of allegations.

Hillsong criticised the 60 Minutes report, saying it was "factually wrong, sensationalised, unbalanced and highly unethical". Hillsong stated that it had investigated both incidents and reported the assault on Crenshaw to police in May 2019. It defended its decision to retain Mays on the grounds that the magistrate had described the offence as "low-level", that Mays had expressed remorse for his actions, and that Crenshaw's account was contradicted by other witnesses. It also claimed that "Katherine" had been unwilling to provide details about the date and perpetrator of the alleged rape, and was unwilling to take the matter to the police. Nine News journalist Tom Steinfort criticised Hillsong's response as "tone-deaf" and accused the church leadership of victim blaming.

=== COVID-19 rule breaches ===
In January 2022, during the COVID-19 pandemic, participants at a Hillsong youth camp at the Glenrock scout camp near Newcastle, New South Wales, were filmed dancing and singing without masks. While the state government's public health order did not apply to religious gatherings, singing and dancing at most recreational and public venues and gatherings was prohibited. NSW Health ordered the organisers of the Hillsong youth camp to stop singing and dancing after public outcry and media coverage from a video of the youth camp. The Premier of New South Wales, Dominic Perrottet, stated that he was "completely shocked" by the video from the event. In response, Hillsong apologised for reinforcing the perception that they were not complying with the public health order and stated that they would comply with health authorities' instructions and maintained that the youth camp was not a music festival. While New South Wales Police personnel spoke with organisers of the youth camp, they declined to issue a fine. All attendees were tested before arriving at the camp.

=== Resignations of senior pastors ===
In March 2022, Brian Houston resigned his position as global senior pastor after an internal investigation into his misconduct began. It was reported that in both 2013 and 2019 he had engaged in inappropriate behaviour with women connected to the church.

Hillsong Dallas pastor Reed Bogard resigned in January 2021, two weeks before an internal investigation found that he had been accused of raping a female junior colleague while serving at Hillsong New York City. According to the report, the married Bogard had been having an affair with the colleague between 2013 and 2014, and Hillsong Australia had been aware of the affair in the second half of 2014 but had declined to take action. Hillsong paused the Dallas campus in April 2021 following Bogard's resignation.

On 24 March 2022, Sam Collier, the lead pastor of Hillsong Atlanta, established less than a year earlier, resigned, citing the ongoing scandals and allegations towards senior figures in Hillsong church. Collier was the first African-American pastor to lead a Hillsong church. He announced plans to establish his own church.

In late March 2022, Hillsong Phoenix lead pastor, Terry Crist, announced that his church would be leaving the Hillsong global network, citing a loss of confidence in Hillsong's Global Board leadership in the wake of the resignation of founder Houston.

As of 6 April 2022, nine Hillsong branches in the US had separated from the church since the revelations about Houston.

On 10 May 2023, Houston's daughter Laura Toggs and her husband Peter Toganivalu, founders and global pastors of youth ministry group Hillsong Young & Free, announced to the church that they were leaving Hillsong, citing that they were called by God elsewhere.

Several worship leaders from Hillsong have since departed the church, including Toggs, Brooke Ligertwood (aka Brooke Fraser), Taya Gaukrodger, and Benjamin William Hastings.

=== Property acquisition ===
An investigative report on ABC TV's 7.30 program on 6 April 2022 revealed that Hillsong had acquired many properties that had been hidden behind a web of entities across the world. It had done this in part by assuming financial control over other churches, starting with Garden City Church in 2009, which later transferred over 12 properties in Brisbane to one of the Hillsong charities, with no transfer of money. It has also taken control of the finances of at least one church in Sydney, which has since broken away. It took over Hillsong Kyiv in 2014, coercing its then pastors to hand over assets and leave Hillsong. An investigator from the Trinity Foundation in Dallas found that Hillsong owned at least three condominiums in New York City, a US$3.5-million home in California and 31 properties in Arizona, expected to be worth a total of US$40 million by 2023. Its corporate and financial structures mean that the church is protected against litigation which demands large payouts to plaintiffs.

=== Criticism by Hillsong leadership ===
On 19 March 2022, John Mays, head of people and development in the church, wrote a letter to the global leadership recommending that the Houstons should be dismissed from the church, saying that they had contributed to "many unhealthy people practices... over many years". He alleged that Brian Houston had a "strong, immovable, leadership disposition together with a distinct lack of personal accountability", and that Bobbie was not a victim, but also shared the responsibility of maintaining accountability. He said that the motive behind his letter was "to support Hillsong employees" rather than personal malice, and that he joined in celebrating aspects of the Houstons' legacy.

== See also ==
- C3 Church Global
- Transformational Christianity – Modern evangelical movement
