= Futures Church =

Church in Australia and United States

Coordinates: 34.870053°S 138.668331°E

- Futures Church South Australia Incorporated
- Futures Church
- Location: Australia: Paradise, Adelaide city, Reynella, Clare Valley, Salisbury, Mount Barker, Victor Harbor; United States: Alpharetta, Georgia
- Country: Australia and United States
- Denomination: Australian Christian Churches
- Website: Futures Church

History
- Former name(s): Influencers Church; Adelaide Assembly of God; Klemzig Assembly of God; Paradise Assembly of God; Paradise Community Church
- Founded: 1922
- Founder: Smith Wigglesworth crusade

Futures Church, formerly Influencers Church, is a Pentecostal church affiliated to the Assemblies of God, with congregations in the state of South Australia, Australia, and in the southern United States. It was founded in Adelaide in 1922. In 2023, Influencers Church officially changed their name to Futures Church. The church teaches a prosperity gospel.

== History ==
The church was founded in 1922 by British evangelist Smith Wigglesworth., becoming known as Adelaide Assembly of God (AOG) when a property on Franklin Street, Adelaide was purchased in 1944. In 1951 Tom Evans, a British missionary from India, became senior pastor. Pastors John and Beryl Jobe commenced as senior pastors in 1959. Their vision was to move into the suburbs where the people lived, so the Franklin Street property was sold, and the church relocated to Payneham, before it shifted to Main North East Road Klemzig.

In 1970, Andrew Evans, the oldest son of Tom Evans, became the first non-founding senior pastor of what was by then called Klemzig Assembly of God. Under his ministry the church grew from weekly church attendance of 150 to over 2,000 people.

In 1982, the church moved to its current location in Paradise, becoming known as Paradise Assembly of God, and later changing its name to Paradise Community Church. At this time, Paradise AOG also set up Paradise (later Adelaide) College of Ministries, as an accredited bible college in South Australia. In 1994, members from the Paradise church formed a sister church, originally called Southside Christian Church, but later renamed Edge Church. The church also fostered the formation of Youth Alive Australia.

In 1997 the contemporary worship music band Planetshakers was created out of the first Planetshakers Conference. In 2000, Andrew Evans's youngest son Ashley and his wife Jane took over as senior pastors at Paradise, and the Planetshakers youth movement grew. In 2004, his eldest son Russell and wife Sam Evans moved to Melbourne to form Planetshakers Church.

In the 2000s, Paradise's church attendance grew to over 6,000 people, and it expanded to three other locations (Elizabeth, West, and City), introduced a Friday night service, and had become the fifth-largest church in Australia.

In 2012, Paradise Community Church changed its name to Influencers Church (Global) to reflect that the church is expanding internationally. In 2015, it was one of the biggest churches in Australia.

The Evans family moved to Atlanta, Georgia, US, and launched the church there, earning $631,728 in its first year there, as in Australia, all tax free. Ashley and Jane Evans with their youngest son moved into a three-storey five-bedroom, five-bathroom mansion, with a wine cellar and theatre, in Atlanta.

In November 2022, Influencers Church celebrated their 100th year anniversary. In 2023, the church was renamed Futures Church.

In March 2025, a staff member who had previously been a youth pastor at the Salisbury branch was arrested in Atlanta, charged with allegedly sending several videos depicting child sexual abuse.

== Beliefs ==
The church teaches a "prosperity gospel", saying that people can have wealth on earth as well as in heaven. They suggest that adherents donate a tenth of their income to the church each month based on the practice of tithing. The Paradise church had a total tax-free income of A$6.2 million in 2014, and assets of almost $20 million.

Some political figures have connections with the church, including Andrew Evans who is father of current pastor Ashley Evans, a pastor at the prior Paradise Church for 30 years and was leader of the conservative Family First political party. Liberal Party of Australia foreign affairs minister Alexander Downer commented positively on the church's focus on God, the Bible and the message of Christ. Famous people who have attended Paradise include Channel 9 journalist Kate Collins and actress Debra Byrne. The church was also featured on A Current Affair, Compass, The Australian, and The Age. Peter Goers has commonly cited the church in rhetoric light. Apart from media interest, the church also has a television program which screens in different countries and recently started airing each Sunday on Channel 9. Paradise also utilises regular television and radio advertisement for marketing communications, particularly during the Christmas and Easter seasons.

Ashley Evans has held the office of State President of Australian Christian Churches of South Australia and a previous member of the National Executive of the Australian Christian Churches. His wife Jane Evans has been influential as the national board member of charity Compassion Australia.

== Music ==
The profile of Futures Church was boosted after the inaugural Australian Idol, singer Guy Sebastian publicly announced his connection with the church as a singer. Before his success in Australian Idol, Sebastian had taught at the church music school.

Futures Church produces original music under the artist "Futures". Their first single "Imaginations", released on 8 September 2017, hit first place on the iTunes "Inspirational" charts on date of release. They subsequently released an EP called Imagine on in 2017 and their first album, Just the Cross in 2019. The church released a studio album, Hills & Horizons, and another live worship record, Together With Heaven, in August 2023.

In 2021, Dreamers Youth, the youth ministry of the church, went on to form a musical group called Dreamers, with the first EP "Land of the Living" being released on 13 August 2021, and first album self-titled Dreamers on 21 October 2022.

== See also ==
- Saddleback Church
- Willowcreek Church
- Mars Hill Church
- Australian Christian Churches
