= Ralph Read =

Superintendent of the Assemblies of God in Australia from (1969-1977)

Ralph Read is a Pentecostal Christian pastor in the Assemblies of God and was the Superintendent of the Assemblies of God in Australia from 1969 to 1977.

== Biography ==
Read had been associated with Baptist and Methodist churches prior to receiving the Baptism of the Holy Spirit in 1938. Ten years later he joined the Assemblies of God, assisting the Sturgeons on their evangelistic campaign in 1948 and, afterwards, accepting an appointment to pastor a Pentecostal assembly in Orange, today known as "Orange Christian Ministry Centre". He was later to teach at "Richmond Temple's Bible College", and thereafter to minister in various AOG churches and, for a time, was editor of the AOG denominational magazine "The Evangel".

Preceded by Alec Davidson	National President of the Assemblies of God in Australia; 1969–1977	Succeeded by Andrew Evans
