= Andrew Evans (pastor) =

Australian politician (1935–2023)

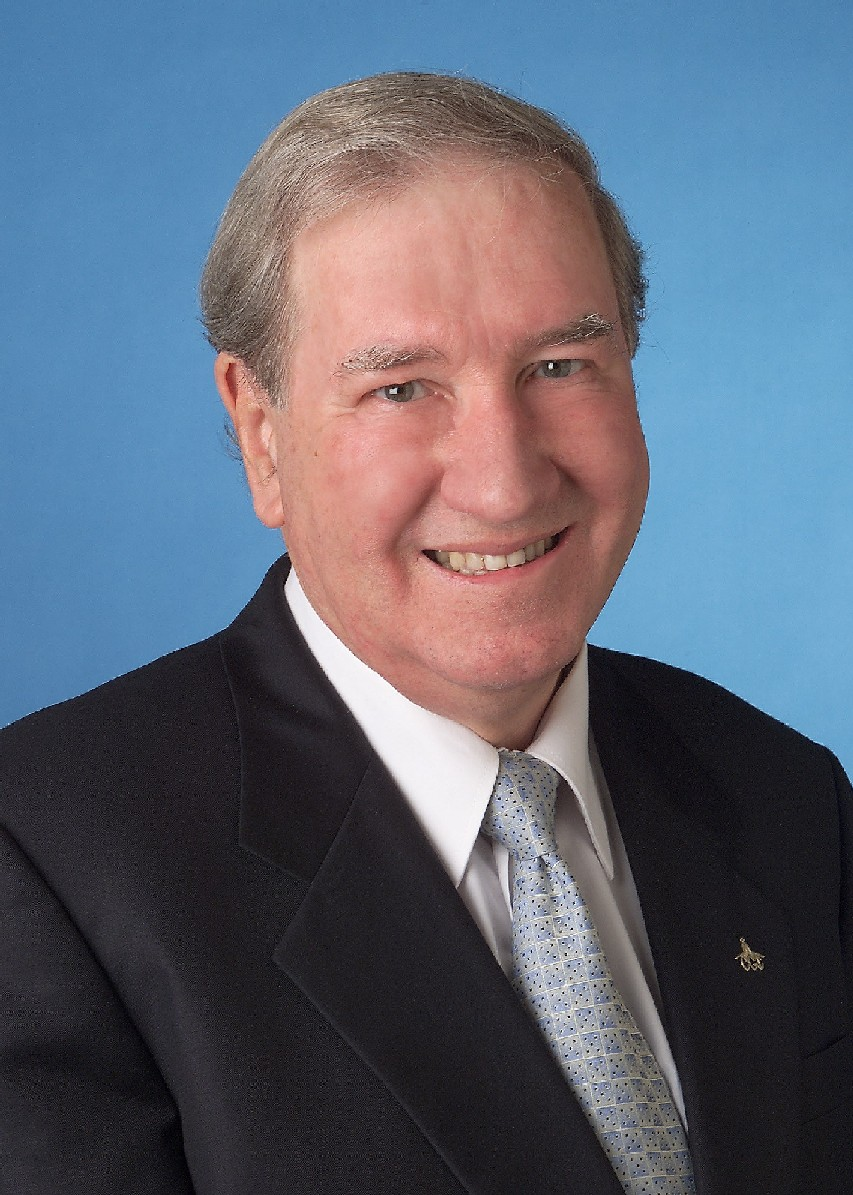

Member of the South Australian Legislative Council
- In office 2002–2008

Personal details
- Born: 17 June 1935 British India
- Died: 26 May 2023 (aged 87)
- Spouse: Lorraine Evans
- Children: Ashley Evans, Russell Evans
- Occupation: Pastor, politician

Andrew Lee Evans OAM (born Wilfred Andrew Lever Evans; 17 June 1935 – 26 May 2023) was an Australian Pentecostal Christian pastor in the Assemblies of God and a politician in the South Australian Legislative Council. Evans was most notable as pastor of the then Paradise Community Church (now Futures Church) for 30 years and co-founding the conservative Family First Party.

== Early life and education ==
Andrew L. Evans was born to missionary parents Tom and Stella Evans in British India and was the older brother of pastor Fred Evans. From 1958 to 1960, Evans studied for Christian Ministry at the Assemblies of God Commonwealth Bible College in Brisbane (now known as Alphacrucis in Parramatta, Sydney). He graduated with a Diploma in Theology in December 1960 and was ordained to the Ministry in 1963. He then served as a missionary with AOG World Missions in the East Sepik province of Papua New Guinea from 1963 to 1969.

== Career ==
From 1970 Evans served as Senior Pastor first of Klemzig Assembly of God in Adelaide, then Paradise Assembly of God (now Futures Church) when the church relocated there in 1982. In 1977 he became the National Superintendent of the Assemblies of God in Australia, which position he held for 20 years and saw a new church started every 11 days.

Evans retired as the senior pastor of Paradise AOG in 2000, after 30 years, the church had reached over 4000 members, when his eldest son assumed the leadership. Another son formed the Planetshakers Church in Melbourne.

== Politics ==
After retiring, Evans helped co-found the Family First Party and was elected into the Legislative Council at the 2002 state election, retiring from service on 3 July 2008.

== Death ==
Evans died on 26 May 2023, at the age of 87.

== Awards and achievements ==
Evans received a Doctor of Divinity from the unaccredited California Graduate School of Theology on 5 August 1981. He was also awarded a Doctor of Ministries on 20 September 1994 from the School of Theology in California. He was awarded the Order of Australia Medal OAM for his service to the Christian Church 26 January 2003.

In the South Australian Parliament from 2002 to 2008, he

- introduced the Bill that removed the bar to prosecuting people for sexual offences committed before 1 December 1982
- introduced the motion that established the Select Committee into the Status of Fathers in South Australia
- Compelled the State Labor Government to include an interim 2020 target for its climate change legislation

Preceded by Ralph Read	National President of the Assemblies of God in Australia; 1977–1997	Succeeded by Brian Houston
