= Christian Life Centre =

Common name for Pentecostal churches in Australia

Christian Life Centre (commonly abbreviated to CLC) is or was a name given to a number of Pentecostal churches in Australia, many of them affiliated with the Australian Christian Churches (formerly Assemblies of God, or AOG) network. Hills Christian Life Centre, which has since changed its name to Hillsong Church, was one of these, and spawned other churches in Australia and around the globe.

== Australia ==
=== Queensland ===
Christian Life Centre Brisbane was founded in Brisbane in 1972 by Trevor Chandler and Clark Taylor. The latter left at the end of the year, but this CLC grew into one of the first mega churches in Brisbane under Chandler, and later into a national and international organisation. Chandler later rejected the teachings of the earlier Pentecostal movements, and in 2000 Brian Andrew took over as leader. However he fell out with the CLC International denomination, and the Brisbane CLC flagship mother church left that movement and joined the AOG network, which was larger. In 2007, the church merged with Metro Church Brisbane, under Paul Geerling, and from that point the CLC movement slowed its growth. (Metro Church Brisbane changed its name to iSEE Church in April 2012), and as of February 2022 is still run by Geerling and his wife Jo. It has six locations in Australia as well as one each in Mumbai and Hong Kong.

=== New South Wales ===
==== Hillsong origins ====
The Sydney Christian Life Centre, described by scholar Sam Hey as "a neo-Pentecostal megachurch", was founded in 1977 by New Zealander Frank Houston, "considered the father of Sydney's Pentecostal churches". He built the church at 188 Young St, Waterloo. The church joined AOG in the 1980s, and over time Houston became the most senior AOG person in New South Wales. In his later life he faced multiple allegations of child sexual abuse. The Sydney CLC founded a college under David Johnston in 1983, located at Arncliffe and known as the International Institute for Creative Ministries (IICM); however, in 1989 Johnston parted ways with the IICM and founded the Wesleyan college which became Wesley Institute, today Excelsia College.

The Hills Christian Life Centre, was founded by Houston's son, Brian Houston, and his wife Bobbie, at Baulkham Hills, New South Wales, in 1983, as an AOG church.

Frank Houston's Waterloo church merged with the Hills CLC in May 1999, after he had been exposed as a paedophile, and the church was renamed Hillsong Church in 2001. As of February 2022 the city church is called the "Sydney Waterloo" or "Sydney City Campus" of Hillsong Church. The college which had, after the 1989 split, moved back to the Sydney CLC church, eventually grew into Hillsong College, which initially had two Sydney campuses. As of 2022 Hillsong College retains the official trading name of Sydney Christian Life Centre Pty Ltd.

==== Others ====
The Liverpool Christian Life Centre was founded by John and Carol McMartin in 1982, and renamed Inspire Church in 2010. In late 2020 John McMartin stepped down from his role, which was taken up by his son, after being charged with sexual assault of a 19-year-old woman at his home, to which he has pleaded not guilty.

Others include:

- Christian Life Centre, Mona Vale, New South Wales

Christian Life Centre, Lismore, New South Wales, was pastored by Garnet Budge in the early 1980s. Later that same decade Pastor Terry Boyle took over the role. The church operated a school called "Summerland Christian Academy" which included all grades from Kindergarten to year 12.

Christian Life Centre, Kyogle, New South Wales, was initially pastored by Pastor John Carrothers and his wife, Janet. Pastor Barry Winton and his wife, Joan, pastored this church from the mid-1980s.

== In other countries ==
- Christian Life Centre Auckland, New Zealand
- Christian Life Centre Oxford, founded in 1996 by Pastor Grady Reid, as of 2022 still pastor, with his wife Cindy
- The London Christian Life Centre was planted by Hillsong Church pastors Gerard and Sue Keehan in 1992, becoming Hillsong Church London in 2000, and spawning 11 other branches in the UK, run out of rented premises.
- Kyiv Christian Life Centre, now Hillsong Church Kyiv

== CLC today ==
As of 2010 CLC International had 27 churches in its CLC denomination in Australia, and around 2005 churches overseas, and was being led by Phillip Mutzelburg in Brassal, Queensland.

== See also ==
- Christian Outreach Centre, former name of the International Network of Churches, including the Citipointe group
