= Philip Duncan =

Philip Duncan is a Pentecostal Christian pastor in the Australian Christian Churches.

He was the Chairman of the Assemblies of God in Australia movement from 1945 to 1950. While leader of the Assemblies of God, Duncan made the executive decision to start a ministry-training Bible college. In 1948, Commonwealth Bible College was established, which is today Southern Cross College. In 1950, Philip was the principal of the college. Duncan was also the senior pastor of Petersham Assembly of God, the third oldest church in the movement.

| Preceded by Charles Greenwood | National President of the Assemblies of God in Australia; 1941–1950 | Succeeded by Alec Davidson |
