= Australian Christian Churches =

Australian network of Pentecostal churches, formerly Assemblies of God in Australia

- Classification: Protestant
- Orientation: Pentecostal
- Theology: Finished Work Pentecostalism
- Associations: World Assemblies of God Fellowship
- Region: Australia
- Origin: 1937; Sydney, New South Wales
- Merger of: Assemblies of God Queensland and Pentecostal Church of Australia
- Separations: Christian Revival Crusade; Hillsong Church
- Official website: www.acc.org.au

The Australian Christian Churches (ACC), formerly the Assemblies of God in Australia, is a network of Finished Work Pentecostal churches in Australia affiliated with the World Assemblies of God Fellowship. The movement was formed in 1937 and, according to the denomination, comprises over 1,100 churches, more than 3,300 pastors and over 400,000 constituents; independent surveys also list the ACC among Australia's largest denominations by number of local churches.

== Beliefs ==
The Doctrinal Basis of Australian Christian Churches contains the central beliefs of the denomination. Its 20 articles are summarized below:

1. There is only one true God who exists as a Trinity.
2. Jesus Christ is the Son of God and, as the second person of the Trinity, is God.
3. The Holy Spirit is the third person of the Trinity. He convicts and regenerates the sinner and guides the believer into all truth.
4. The Bible is inspired by God and is "the supreme authority in all matters of faith and conduct".
5. The devil is a real being who "seeks to destroy the faith of every believer in the Lord Jesus Christ".
6. Man was created good by God but, because of voluntary transgression, fell. As a result, men are "separated from original righteousness" (see original sin).
7. Christ's death on the cross has made full atonement for the world's sins.
8. Salvation "is received through repentance toward God and faith toward the Lord Jesus Christ". In this "new birth", the believer is regenerated, justified, and adopted into the family of God.
9. The Church is the Body of Christ and consists of all people who accept Christ, regardless of Christian denomination. It is to work to fulfill the Great Commission.
10. Believer's baptism by single immersion as a declaration to the world of the believer's identification with Christ in his death, burial and resurrection.
11. Observance of the Lord's Supper as a symbolic remembrance of Christ's suffering and death.
12. Sanctification, "an act of separation from that which is evil, and of dedication unto God".
13. Baptism in the Holy Spirit is a separate and subsequent experience following conversion which brings empowerment to be an effective witness for Christ. Speaking in tongues is the initial evidence of this experience.
14. The nine supernatural gifts of the Holy Spirit, as recorded in 1 Corinthians 12:8–10, continue to operate in the present day. The Assemblies of God also believes in the ministry gifts (apostles, prophets, evangelists, pastors and teachers), as recorded in Epistle to the Ephesians 4:11–13.
15. Divine healing of the sick is provided for in the atonement.
16. The Second Coming of Christ will be a premillennial, imminent and personal return.
17. Christ will return to establish his millennial reign on the earth.
18. The wicked "who wilfully reject and despise the love of God" will face "everlasting punishment".
19. There will be new heavens and a new earth "in which righteousness dwells".
20. The heavens and earth and all original life forms "were made by the specific immediate creative acts of God as described in the account of origins presented in Genesis".

At the end of the 20th century, there was a decrease in emphasis on speaking in tongues as the initial evidence as well as the Second Coming of Christ as traditionally understood by Pentecostals. At the same time, the church growth movement and the prosperity gospel became important parts of the denomination's identity.

== Worship ==
ACC churches follow Pentecostal style services which involve contemporary praise and worship, speaking in tongues, lifting of hands in worship and preaching. While the ACC use a wide range of worship styles, generally churches use contemporary praise and worship music for services. From using hymns in the 1930s to 1950s, music from the Jesus movement in the 1960s and 1970s and the contemporary praise and worship of the 1980s to today, ACC churches have continually adapted to new styles of praise and worship.

In recent decades, churches affiliated with the ACC have revolutionised church praise and worship. The largest driving force for this change was the popularity of the Hillsong Music label, featuring the bands Hillsong United, Hillsong Worship and Hillsong Young & Free, of Hillsong Church (since 2018 no longer a member of ACC). Other influences have been bands such as Planetshakers and Planetboom, and Influencers Church in Adelaide.

== Structure ==
=== Churches ===
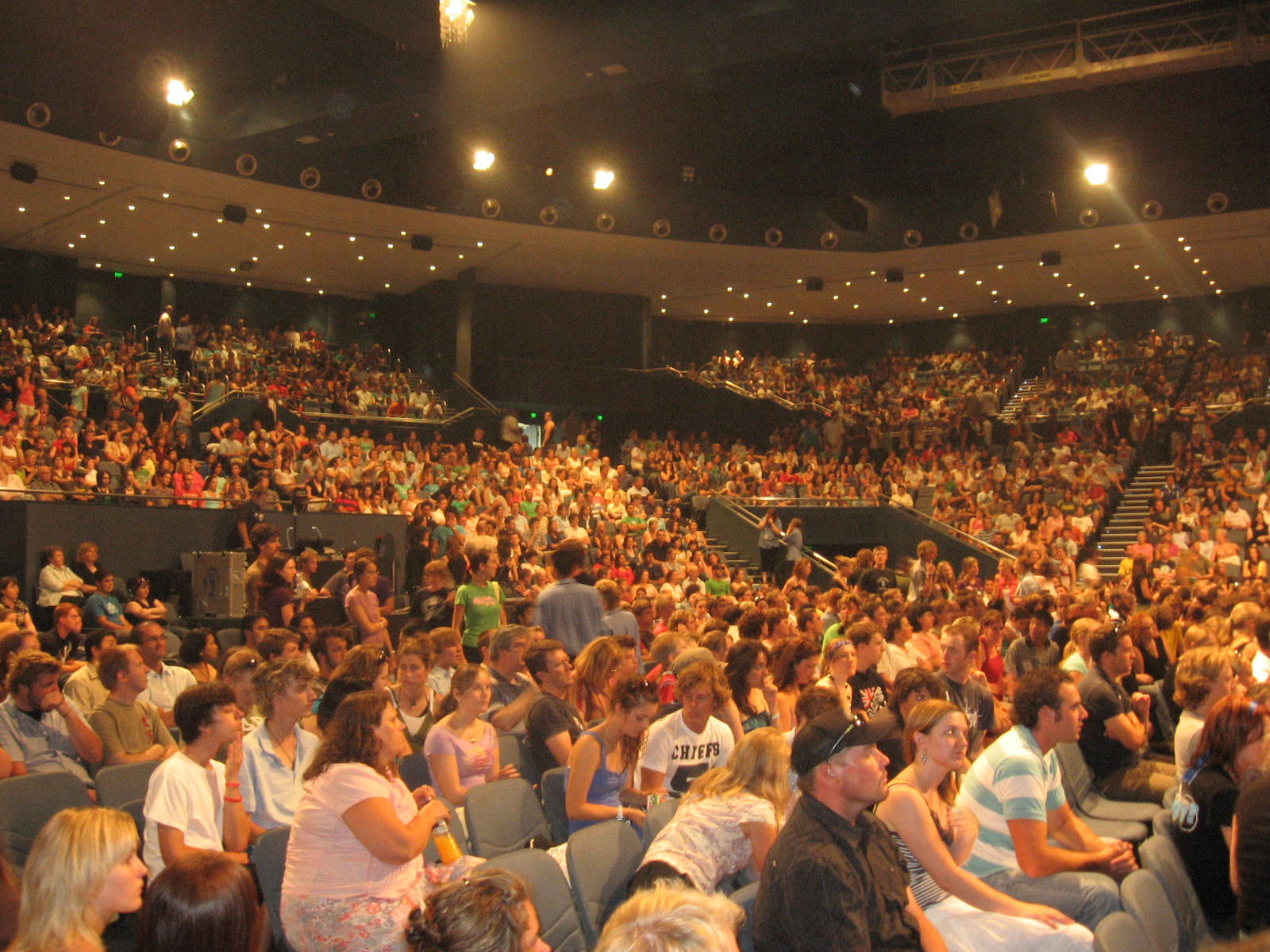
Hillsong Church, Sydney

The polity of the Assemblies of God is based on the principle of voluntary and cooperative fellowship. "Registered" churches (mature and self-supporting) are autonomous but agree to abide by the United Constitution, state by-laws, and policies of the National Conference, the highest governing body of the Assemblies of God. "Provisional" churches are churches which have not met the requirements to become registered churches and are under the direct supervision of state executives.

=== State conferences ===
The Assemblies of God is led in each state by a conference and executive. These bodies are empowered to manage all affairs that do not concern the national denomination. The roles of the state executive are similar to those of the national executive but specialised to the state with a closer relationship to local churches. The state executives recommend to the national executive eligible candidates for ordination. They provide assistance to churches requesting advice or intervention and also have the authority to discipline ministers. At the request of the state executive or at its own discretion, the national executive can intervene in a state's governance.

=== National conference ===
The biennial national conference is a representative body of all ordained ministers and all registered churches. Every church is entitled to send one delegate for every 250 adults in regular attendance.

The national conference elects the nine-member national executive, which includes the national officers. The officers are national president, vice-president, and secretary. National executives are always ordained ministers, except for the national secretary who can be a layperson. National officers serve terms of four years; all other executives serve two-year terms. The national executive issues ministerial credentials and, in between sessions of the national conference, is the chief policy making body of the denomination.

=== National presidents ===
Until 1997, the national leader of ACC was titled superintendent. The incumbent national president, as from 2025, is Joel Chelliah.

#	Name	Appointment	Secession	Time in
1	Charles Greenwood	1937	1941	4 years
2	Henry Wiggins	1941	1943	2 years
–	Charles Greenwood	1943	1945	2 years
3	Philip Duncan	1945	1950	5 years
4	Edward Irish	1950	1951	1 year
5	Alec Davidson	1951	1955	4 years
6	James Walace	1955	1959	4 years
–	Alec Davidson	1959	1969	10 years
7	Ralph Read	1969	1977	8 years
8	Andrew Evans	1977	1997	20 years
9	Brian Houston	1997	2009	12 years
10	Wayne Alcorn	2009	2025	16 years
10	Joel Chelliah	2025	-	-

== Missions, ministries and educational institutions ==
=== Missions ===
ACCI Missions and Relief is a department of the Australian Christian Churches and currently headed up by Pastor Alun Davies, with ACCI Missions being the missionary sending and support agency and ACCI Relief the aid and development agency.

=== Ministries ===
Australian Christian Churches has many ministries in place to serve the church. These include:

- ACCI Missions and Relief
- Australian Christian Services
- Chaplaincy Australia
- Youth Alive Australia

Australian Christian Churches supports many organisations including Mercy Ministries, Teen Challenge and Compassion Australia.

Southern Cross College, Sydney

=== Education ===
In order to train future pastors and leaders in the denomination, Commonwealth Bible College (also known as Southern Cross Bible College, and now known as Alphacrucis) was established in 1948 as the official ministry training school of Australian Christian Churches. Since the emergence of megachurches, large churches have begun establishing their own bible colleges. At the beginning of the 21st century, it was estimated that there are over 3,000 full-time students being trained at bible colleges affiliated with Australian Christian Churches.

== Statistics ==
The denomination claims more than 1,100 churches and over 225,000 adherents across Australia. In 2007, affiliated churches had an average congregation of 179 people and 26 churches had over 1,000 members.

== History ==
=== Predecessors ===
Pentecostalism in Australia emerged as a loose movement of churches and evangelists around 1909. The first steps towards a denominational structure were made in 1927 when the founder of the Good News Hall in Melbourne, Sarah Jane Lancaster, and her network of churches, collaborated with colorful and controversial itinerant evangelist Frederick Van Eyk (sometimes spelled Eyck) of the South African Apostolic Faith Mission (AFM) to form the Australasian AFM. The AFM name was taken from the Azusa Street Revival in Los Angeles, United States. The AFM had also affiliated congregations in New Zealand.

The AFM was short lived, however. Doctrinal controversy, disputes over female authority, the volatile character of its leaders and accusations of immorality against Van Eyk led to the movement splitting. In 1928, the AFM's northern churches formed the Assemblies of God, Queensland, and a year later many other AFM affiliates joined the newly established Pentecostal Church in Australia. What remained of the AFM dissolved after Lancaster's death in 1934.

==== Assemblies of God Queensland ====
At a 4 July 1929 conference of the AFM's Queensland pastors, the decision was made to separate from the AFM and form the Assemblies of God Queensland. Besides the controversy over Van Eyk, many Queensland pastors had long been concerned over Lancaster's non-Trinitarian and annihilationist beliefs. They adopted the Assemblies of God name to gain the recognition of the global Pentecostal movement, as Australian Pentecostal churches were dependent upon visiting clergy.

The AGQ would be challenged by the Brisbane revival of American evangelist William Booth-Clibborn, grandson of Salvation Army founder William Booth. He came to Australia in 1930 and stayed two years, beginning an evangelistic work in Brisbane which grew to fill a two thousand seat tent, the Canvas Cathedral. It has been described as "the greatest religious revival Brisbane has seen". While the AGQ initially welcomed the revival, they became competitors when Booth-Clibborn organised the revival campaign into Covenant Christian Church and many of the AGQ's leaders, including its president George Burns, joined Covenant Christian. After 1932, unity talks began between the two groups and Covenant Christian Church joined the AGQ as Glad Tidings Tabernacle (now Brisbane City Church) in 1940.

==== Pentecostal Church of Australia ====
In 1925, the American evangelist A. C. Valdez visited Australia and was invited by Charles Greenwood to preach at his church in the Melbourne suburb of Sunshine, beginning what would become the year-long Sunshine Revival. The growing congregation converted a movie theatre into a 1,000 seat church known as Richmond Temple. The Pentecostal Church of Australia grew out of this revival, and many of Australia's early Pentecostal churches trace their origins to Richmond Temple. Together, Richmond Temple and the Pentecostal Church, Sydney formed the centre of the expanding PCA.

After a year of revival, Valdez left to pursue itinerant evangelism, and Kelso Glover became the new pastor of Richmond Temple and leader of the PCA. Glover was baptised in the Holy Spirit at the Azusa Street revival and was one of the rare participants in early American Pentecostalism with an intellectual background. Glover thought the greatest need of the Pentecostal movement in Australia was "preachers, anointed of God and rightly instructed in the Word". To meet this need he began a short-lived Bible institute. He also began The Australian Evangel, a monthly publication distributed to PCA members. Glover resigned in October 1927 and handed the church over to Greenwood.

Other foreign evangelists were to have an effect on the PCA and Australian Pentecostalism. English evangelist Smith Wigglesworth spent five months in Australia in 1927 under the sponsorship of the PCA. Wigglesworth's healing crusade reinforced the importance of faith and the ministry of healing in Australian Pentecostalism. In April 1928, Donald Gee of the Assemblies of God in Great Britain attended the annual convention of the PCA.

In 1934, the Melbourne Apostolic Church began near Richmond Temple. Originating in Great Britain, the Apostolic Church was distinct from the majority of Pentecostal groups at the time by its belief in the fivefold offices of apostle, prophet, evangelist, pastor and teacher. Most Pentecostals saw prophecy as a function open to the entire Spirit baptised congregation, not as offices given to specific persons. However, the Apostolic Church ordained both apostles and prophets. Within a week of the Apostolic Church's opening, 70 of Richmond Temple's members left and joined the new church. The Temple's elders believed that Greenwood should resign and the Temple join the Apostolic Church. However, a congregational vote sided with Greenwood, and all but one elder joined the Apostolics. After this upset, the PCA, along with the Assemblies of God Queensland, struggled to distance itself from the Apostolic Church's teaching.

=== 1937 merger ===
By the 1930s, it was recognised by the leaders of both movements that a more harmonious, co-operative and unified relationship was needed. The two bodies were virtually identical doctrinally, culturally, and in their focus on missions and evangelism. Furthermore, the leaders of both movements' had links to the Sunshine Revival.

The two bodies were in some ways different in their polities. Greenwood and Philip Duncan (prominent PCA pastor in Sydney) exercised greater control in their own churches which were large and their influence dominated the other PCA churches. The Queensland churches, on the other hand, were more dispersed and more democratic. Their pastors tended to rotate their tenure, and no single church held preeminence. This tended to make the AGQ more egalitarian.

Led by Enticknap (Queensland), Greenwood (Victoria), and Duncan (New South Wales), the AGQ and PCA held a "United Conference" at the Pentecostal Church in Sydney in 1937. It was decided that the new denomination's name would be the Assemblies of God in Australia. By this time, Greenwood had developed a close relationship with Donald Gee of the British Assemblies of God and was willing to drop the PCA label in exchange for association with the global Assemblies of God movement.

For a national constitution, the conference drew from the two existing constitutions as wells as from the constitution of the Assemblies of God USA. The new fellowship would be based on "voluntary cooperation, on terms of equality" and would be governed by biennial national conferences. Every state was granted autonomy in its own affairs as was each registered assembly. Charles Greenwood was elected the first chairman.

=== World War II ===
From its formation through World War II, the AOG experienced a period of stagnation. At the time of the merger, there were 38 churches and 1,482 members. Over eight years it grew by four churches, but membership decreased to 1,250. In 1939, the AOG declared British Israelism to be a heresy, eventually leading to the formation of the Christian Revival Crusade.

In its early history, the AOG was a peace church having officially adopted a position of pacifism. Article 23 of the AOG constitution declared "we cannot conscientiously participate in war and armed resistance which involves the actual destruction of human life, since this is contrary to ... the inspired Word of God". However, as WWII progressed, there was less consensus on the issue of Christian participation in military service. In the end, the matter was left to "individual conscience".

=== 1950s and 60s ===
In 1948, Commonwealth Bible College (now known as Alphacrucis) was founded to train men and women for ministry. James Wallace, an Assemblies of God minister from Great Britain, was appointed principal of the college in 1951 and was then elected AOG chairman in 1955, holding the post until 1959. During his tenure, the college developed a central role in the fellowship and saw an increased number of pastors, church planters, and missionaries trained. This period saw the AOG double in size from 50 churches in 1951 to almost 100 in 1969. Part of this growth was due to immigration, and ethnic congregations, including Slavic and Italian assemblies, were established.

There was also increased missionary activity, almost all of which was focused on the mission field of Papua New Guinea. This approach was successful and led to the 1973 turning over of all mission property and authority to local churches and the establishment of the self-governing Assemblies of God of Papua New Guinea which by 1998 rivaled the size of the Australian fellowship.

With growth came the need to manage it and the national church's power increased. In 1963, the position of chairman was made a full-time one, and the constitution was reformed to make the AG's polity closer to that of the American Assemblies of God. At the national conference of 1969, state presbyteries (governing bodies) were given more responsibility, the denomination asserted more control over ordination, and the title of chairman was changed to general superintendent.

=== 1970–1980: Charismatic movement and aftermath ===
The impact of the charismatic movement was far reaching in the AOG. It was initially celebrated by classical Pentecostals as a sign that Pentecostalism was influencing traditional churches; however, there were also concerns over the influence the charismatic movement was exerting within the AOG. Pastors of the New Zealand Assemblies of God (AGNZ) would lead the way. Because of its openness to the Latter Rain Movement of the 1950s, the AGNZ was quick to accept the charismatic renewal than the more conservative Australian movement. New Zealand pastors such as Robert Midgley, Frank Houston, and Phil Pringle would significantly influence Australian Pentecostalism, and all ultimately moved their ministries to Australia.

Opposition to the renewal mainly arose over traditional Pentecostal views of mainline churches, especially the Roman Catholic Church, and how those views were being called into question. These churches had historically been mistrusted by Pentecostals, but now many inside these churches were claiming the same experiences that Pentecostals enjoyed without rejecting those churches. Some AOG ministers responded with "new openness to ecumenical relationships", but others warned against "linking hands with modernists and liberals". Tensions escalated and in January 1973 an official statement was published challenging the charismatic practices of prostration (being "slain in the Spirit"), dancing, and the belief that Christians could be demon possessed (everyone in the AOG agreed that non-Christians could indeed be demon possessed).

These tensions fed into the debate over local church autonomy, with charismatic pastors fearing the ability of a conservative denominational leadership forcing its own views on a local congregation. At the 1977 national conference, it seemed that a split within the movement was inevitable. There was no split; however, it was clear that the charismatic faction had gained the support of the movement. Realizing he had lost support, Ralph Read resigned as general superintendent, and Andrew Evans, a supporter the charismatic movement, was elected to replace him. Evans would lead the AOG for 20 years during a tenure that saw the denomination grow from less than 10,000 to over 115,000 members.

=== Recent history ===
Another legacy of Evans' leadership was decentralisation. The autonomy of local churches was now only limited by the AOG's doctrinal statement—which was broad enough to allow for diversity. Church growth techniques also became popular during this period. Prominent pastors such as Frank Houston also began to advocate strong pastoral leadership of the local church—as opposed to the congregationalism traditionally preferred by Pentecostals. During the 1980s and 1990s, mega-churches came to dominate the denomination at both state and national levels. Members of the National Executive were exclusively mega-church pastors, and both state and national departments came under the control of mega-churches. Decentralisation has also occurred in the area of world missions. In 2001, responsibility for particular mission fields was given to "regional churches" (mega-churches or near mega-churches). This occurred at a time when the National Executive has gained power at the expense of the representative National Conference, which by 2003 had only the election of National Executive members on its agenda.

In 2007, the ACC had more than 375,000 adherents with more than 1,100 congregations across the country as of 2001.

In April 2007, at the Assemblies of God in Australia National Conference, the public name of the movement was changed to Australian Christian Churches; however, it remained incorporated as Assemblies of God in Australia until 2013.

==== Political views ====
There has been significant attention drawn to the denomination's relationship to the Family First Party, particularly in light of the party's founder, Andrew Evans, being a former superintendent of the movement, and its one-time leader, Andrea Mason, attending an ACC church. Both Australian Christian Churches and the Family First Party maintain that links are historical only, and that there is no organisational connection at the present time.

Publicly the Assemblies of God in Australia has distanced itself from advocating certain political groups and parties, including the fledgling Family First party:

One thing we are not is a political movement ... The Assemblies of God in Australia does not have a political vision and we don't have a political agenda. I think people need to understand the difference between the church being very involved in politics and individual Christians being involved in politics. There is a big difference.—Brian Houston

==== Australian Idol ====
In October 2007, a Today Tonight story said that several of the final remaining Australian Idol contestants were from Hillsong Church, raising concerns of vote-stacking by the church. It was later revealed that none of the remaining contestants were from Hillsong Church, but several were from churches affiliated with Australian Christian Churches.

== Church names ==
When the Assemblies of God in Australia was incorporated in 1937, churches generally were the name of the location and then the words "Assembly of God". For example, the AOG church in Paradise, South Australia, was called "Paradise Assembly of God" (now called Influencers Church).

When Frank Houston moved to Australia from New Zealand in 1977 to establish a church in Sydney, he called his church the Sydney Christian Life Centre. From his church, Houston established several others with the Christian Life Centre (CLC) name.

From the 1990s onwards, many churches with "Assembly of God" or "Christian Life Centre" in their name changed their names to make it shorter and more generic, for example, Shire Christian Centre became Shirelive Church and Mt. Gravatt Assembly of God became Garden City Christian Church. Hills Christian Life Centre became Hillsong Church in 2001, after the name "Hillsong" became more well-known than the church name through its music.

== Megachurches ==
A megachurch is a Protestant church having 2,000 or more people in average weekend attendance.

Most of the megachurches in Australia are affiliated with Australian Christian Churches. In the 1970s and 1980s, the largest churches in the movement were Garden City Christian Church and Paradise Community Church. In the 1990s, Hillsong Church became the largest church in the movement and also in Australia until Hillsong Church separated from the Australian Christian Churches in 2018.

Church	Location	Founded	Attendance
Kingdomcity	Perth, WA	2009	11,000
Influencers Church	Paradise, Adelaide, SA	1982	8,000
Hope Centre	Bowen Hills, Brisbane, QLD	1930	3,200
Calvary Christian Church	Townsville, QLD	1924	3,000
GLOW Church Australia	Robina, Gold Coast, QLD	2013	3,000
Nexus Church	Everton Park, Brisbane, QLD	1952	2,500
Inspire Church	Hoxton Park, Sydney, NSW	1981	2,500

=== Megachurches previously affiliated with Australian Christian Churches ===
Hillsong Church at Baulkham Hills, Sydney, NSW separated from Australian Christian churches in 2018.

== Notable members ==
- Stuart Robert, former Australian politician
- Scott Morrison, former Prime Minister

== See also ==
- International Network of Churches, a separate network of Pentecostal churches, formerly Christian Outreach Centre
