= Inspire Church =

Australian Church

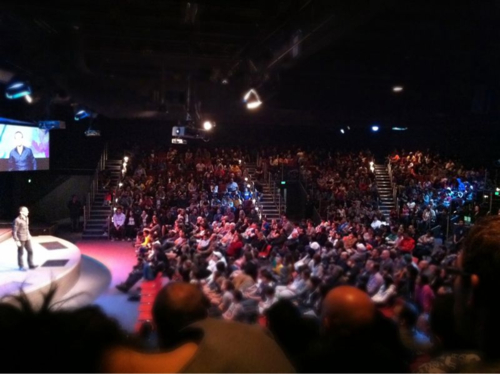
- Service in 2011
- Inspire Church
- Country: Australia
- Website: inspirechurch.com

History
- Founded: 1982

Inspire Church, founded as Liverpool Christian Life Centre, is a Pentecostal Christian church affiliated with Australian Christian Churches, the Assemblies of God in Australia. It is located in Hoxton Park, in the City of Liverpool, in the Greater Western Sydney region, Australia.

== History ==
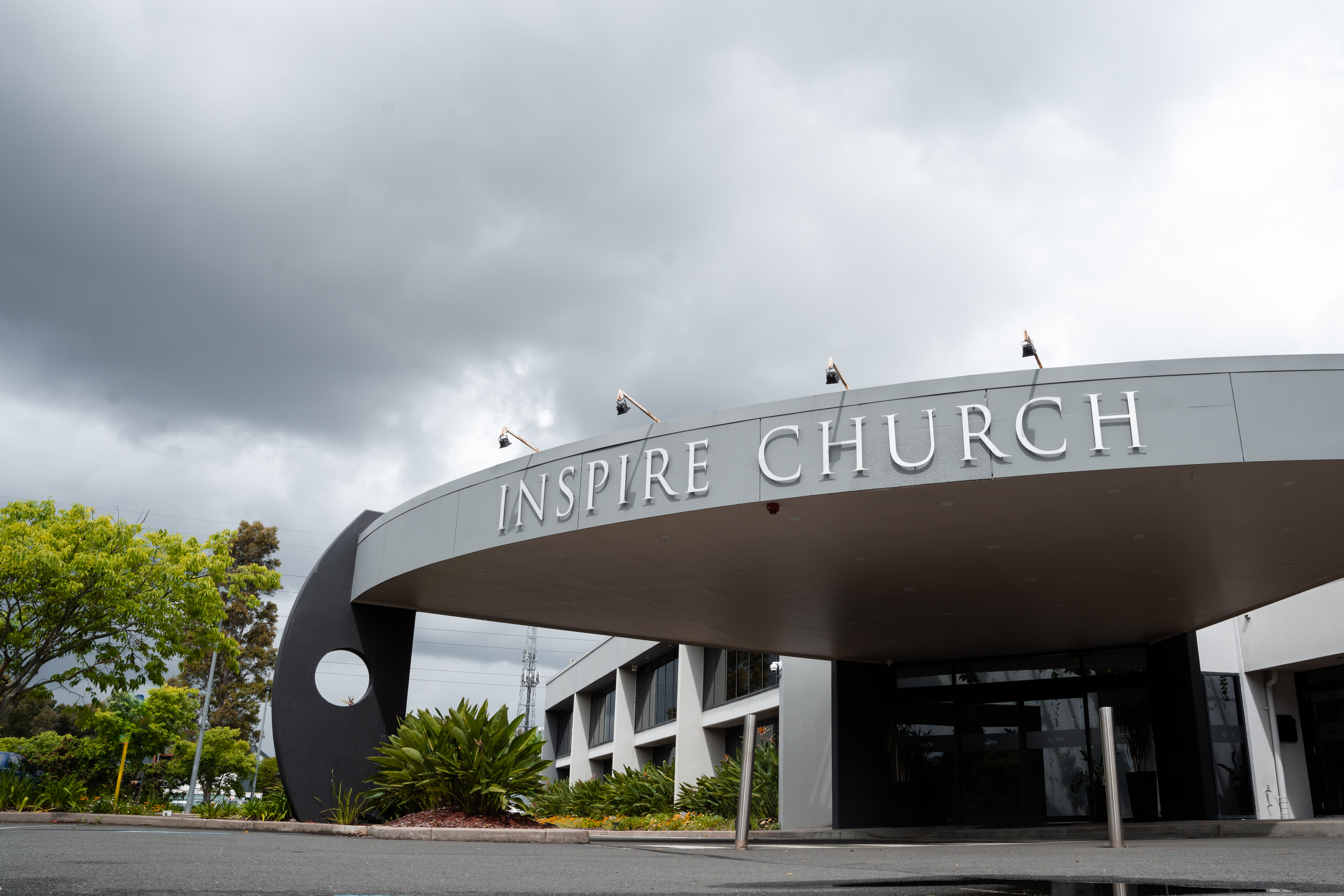
Inspire Church Liverpool.

The church was founded in 1982, with Pastors John and Carol McMartin as Liverpool Christian Life Centre (one of several Christian Life Centres).

In 2007, the attendance was 4,500 people.

On 31 August 2008 Liverpool Christian Life Centre changed its name to Inspire Church. The church was registered as Inspire Church in January 2010.

In 2012, the attendance was 5,000 people, making Inspire Church one of the largest ACC Churches in Australia at the time.

In late 2020, John McMartin stepped aside from his role after being charged with sexual assault. The senior pastors, chairperson and joint CEOs are Brendan and Melissa McMartin, who were appointed after the NSW Police charged Senior Pastor John McMartin with Assault with an Act of Indecency in November 2020.

The main building consists of an auditorium which can seat approximately 1,000 people.

It is linked to other churches of the same name in Ingleburn, and Wollongong,

== Beliefs ==
Inspire Church is a Pentecostal church affiliated with Australian Christian Churches (the Australian branch of the Assemblies of God).

== Inspire College ==
Inspire College, (formerly Sydney Training Institute) is an initiative of Inspire Church, located 40 minutes from Sydney CBD. The aim of the institute is to equip leaders for service in the church through an intern program. The college is registered with VETAB and its courses are nationally accredited. The colleges longstanding principal is Adam Boyse.

== Indecent assault allegations ==
On 26 November 2020, police from the Liverpool Area Command of the NSW Police arrested former pastor John McMartin, and charged him with indecent assault. It was alleged that McMartin sexually assaulted a then 19-year old parishioner at his Pleasure Point home in January 2013. McMartin appeared before Liverpool Local Court on 16 December. McMartin faced court again on 27 January 2021 and the case was rescheduled for October 2021. He has pleaded "Not Guilty". In 2014, McMartin had given a deposition and testimony to the Royal Commission into Institutional Responses into Child Sexual Abuse in his role as the NSW State President of the Australian Christian Churches, in relation to the denomination's responses to the paedophilia of ministers.

== See also ==
- Youth Alive
