= Calvary Christian Church =

Coordinates: 26.6550°S 153.0950°E

- Calvary Christian Church
- Country: Australia
- Denomination: Australian Christian Churches
- Website: calvarycc.org.au

History
- Founded: 1924

Calvary Christian Church is a Pentecostal Church based in Townsville, affiliated with Australian Christian Churches (Assemblies of God).

== History ==
The church was founded in Townsville in 1924.

== Beliefs ==
It is affiliated with Australian Christian Churches (the Australian branch of the Assemblies of God).

== Calvary Leadership College ==
Calvary Leadership College is the Bible college of Calvary Christian Church, training future pastors and leaders from churches all over Australia and other countries. At current the leadership college offers diplomas in Church Leadership, Ministry and Business.

== Calvary Christian College ==
Linked with the Townsville Church is Calvary Christian College, a K-12 independent Christian school founded in 1978. It has seen over 700 students pass through its doors since it was founded.

== See also ==
- Australian Christian Churches
