= Hillsong Brisbane =

Coordinates: 27.542138°S 153.079918°E

Hillsong Brisbane Campus (formerly Garden City Christian Church) is an interstate campus of Sydney based Hillsong Church, a Pentecostal Christian church in Australia.

== History ==
The church was established in 1955 as Mt. Gravatt Assembly of God by Pastor Garnett Budge. In the 1980s, under the leadership of Senior Pastor Dr. Reginald Klimionok, the church experienced growth, with a second new church building being constructed and opened, adjacent to its Rover Street site, seating over 2,000 persons, and membership soared to over 3,500 persons. Its name changed to Garden City Christian Church, it quickly became Australia's first megachurch.

As of 2009, the church, attended by approximately 3,000 people, had 50 staff but without a Senior Pastor. Brian Houston and his wife Bobbie Houston accepted the nomination of the Board for appointment as Senior Pastors of the Church by a general meeting of members that was held on Sunday 26 April 2009. At this Extraordinary General Meeting, approximately 79.1% of Members present on the day (approx 60% of the total membership) agreed with the recommendation of the board to appoint these Pastors as the Senior Pastors of the congregation.

On 24 May 2009, Garden City Christian Church became a campus of Hillsong Church.

== Second Brisbane Campus (Brisbane City) ==
On 21 April 2014 Hillsong Brisbane announced that they were planning on planting a church in The Met nightclub within Fortitude Valley on 25 May 2014. As of 2015, the campus location moved to the Judith Wright Centre of Contemporary Arts, Brisbane City Hall and is now meeting in the Pullman & Mercure Hotel, King George Square. This campus currently services on Sundays at 9 AM and 11AM.

On 8 April 2018 it was announced that Hillsong had purchased Brisbane's disused Tribal theatre with the intentions to renovate it into a permanent home for Hillsong Church Brisbane.

== Ministry Training ==
The campus also operates a ministry internship program related to its Leadership College in Sydney.

== See also ==
- Australian Christian Churches
- Royal Rangers
