= Henry Wiggins =

Henry Excelsior Wiggins (13 May 1906—18 March 1993) was a notable minister, third principal and an integral part of the formation of the Assemblies of God churches in Australia.

He was born in Oxford, Oxfordshire, England where he was raised by his mother Annie Claire Wiggins and his father Ernest Wiggins until he left home in his early twenties. He attended the University of Oxford studying law, but never finished as he decided to become a minister instead.

He originally was in conservative church circles but when his mother became involved in the pentecostal movement around the Lake District area of England, Henry started to look into what this movement was about. Though originally wary of this movement, after attending meetings of Smith Wigglesworth he became convinced that the pentecostal movement was his calling from god. He traveled around England and attended many revivalist meetings where he eventually met his future wife who was at the time Laura Anne Markham. Shortly after their marriage they moved to Nambour, Queensland, Australia to expand the Assemblies of God churches overseas.

He pastored a church in Nambour and along with his wife taught at the Assemblies of God bible college. He became an editor of a pentecostal magazine and published many articles on theological views and eventually became the principal of the college. After pastoring churches in both England and Australia, ministering as the principal of the assemblies of God churches in Australia, he died after suffering from Alzheimer's disease.

== Theological Views ==
Henry Excelsior Wiggins theological views were very much of the early pentecostal movement under figures such as Smith Wigglesworth. He believed in the use of spiritual gifts by churches and in views on women was more open to letting women speak in church services. His articles that contain a lot of his theological views were published onto the internet after his death in 1993.
