= Horizon Church =

- Horizon Church
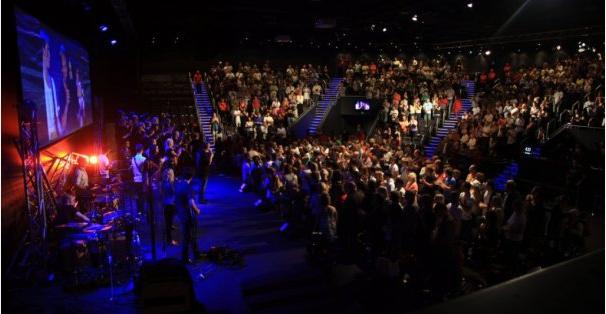
- Worship service in 2010

- 34°01′50″S 151°03′37″E
- Location: Sutherland, NSW: St Andrews, NSW; Busselton, WA; Rote Island, Indonesia
- Country: Australia
- Denomination: Australian Christian Churches
- Churchmanship: Pentecostal
- Website: hz.church

Horizon Church, founded as Sutherland AOG, and formerly more recently Shirelive, is a Pentecostal Christian church affiliated with Australian Christian Churches, the Australian branch of the Assemblies of God denomination. The church's main campus is in the commercial district of Sutherland, a southern suburb of Sydney, New South Wales. The church's senior pastors are Brad and Alison Bonhomme, and the former Prime Minister of Australia, Scott Morrison, is a member of the congregation.

Apart from the original church in Sutherland, Horizon also has satellite churches in St Andrews, a south-western suburb of Sydney; Busselton, Western Australia; and Rote Island in Indonesia, and as of March 2022 is planning another campus in Western Sydney.

== History ==
Horizon Church was created by the Assemblies of God in Australia in 1949, under Pastor Norm Armstrong. The first meeting was in the Sutherland School of Arts Hall. In the early 1950s the church was built at its current location at 7-9 Stapleton Avenue, Sutherland.

The church was founded as Sutherland Assembly of God, later renamed the Christian Growth Centre. In 2000 it became a company limited by guarantee, changing its name to Shire Christian Centre. In May 2006 the church was again rebranded, this time as Shirelive.

In 2007, the church undertook a building project which consisted of stage one, major demolition of existing auditorium, youth centre with the construction of a new 1090-seat convention centre.

On 20 October 2013, Brad and Alison Bonhomme were appointed as the senior pastors of Shirelive, and in 2018 the church changed its name to Horizon Church.

== Governance ==
The church, as a limited company, provides reports to ASIC and the ACNC, and is governed by a board of directors.

== Beliefs and practices ==
As a Pentecostal and evangelical church, Horizon is not a mainstream church in Australia. Some members believe in divine healing, and practise "speaking in tongues", which is seen as a miraculous gift from God.

== Locations ==
Apart from the "flagship" church in Sutherland, NSW, Horizon also has churches in Busselton, Western Australia, Perth, WA and in Sydney South West in the suburb of St Andrews, New South Wales. Services are also held online.
