= List of Assemblies of God people =

The following are notable people associated (past or present) with the Assemblies of God.

Name	Role	Country	Notes
A. A. Allen	Preacher active in the 1950s and 1960s	United States of America	Known for his "raise the dead" campaign
John Ashcroft	Former U.S. attorney general, Missouri senator (1995), and Missouri governor (1985–93)	United States of America	Known as the first Assemblies of God congressman
Carlos Avendaño	Founder of the National Restoration Party, a member of the Legislative Assembly of Costa Rica from 2002 to 2006 and 2010 to 2014. Was a presidential candidate in the 2014 election. Also a pastor.	Costa Rica	
Jim Bakker	Founder of The PTL Club	United States of America	
Tammy Faye Bakker	Ex-wife of Jim Bakker and PTL co-leader	United States of America	Subject of film "The Eyes of Tammy Faye"
Daniel Berg	Founded the Assemblies of God in Brazil with Gunnar Vingren in 1911	Sweden	
Moya Brennan	Grammy Award-winning Irish singer	Ireland	
Johnny Cash	Singer-songwriter, guitarist, actor, and author.	United States of America	
João Campos de Araújo	Politician and Pastor, member of chamber of deputies	Brazil	
Silas Câmara	Politician and Pastor, member of chamber of deputies	Brazil	
Lazarus Chakwera	Politician and since 2013 head of the Malawi Congress Party. Also former president of Malawian division of the Assemblies of God.	Malawi	Resigned as president of the Assemblies of God in Malawi in 2013 to focus on political career.
Alan Chambers	Former president of Exodus International, the largest ex-gay organization in the world	United States of America	
Gary Chapman	Singer-songwriter	United States of America	Parents were ordained Assemblies of God ministers and pastored an AG in Texas; once married to Amy Grant (m. 1982–97)
Toni Childs	Pop singer, raised in the Assemblies of God	United States of America	
David Yonggi Cho	Senior Pastor of the largest church in the world, Yoido Full Gospel Church in Seoul, South Korea	Korea	
Vern Clark	Admiral (United States Navy, Retired) – Former Chief of Naval Operations, graduate of Evangel College Springfield, Missouri	United States of America	
Bruce Cozart	member of the Arkansas House of Representatives from Hot Springs	United States of America	
Jan Crouch	co-founder of Trinity Broadcasting Network	United States of America	
Paul Crouch	co-founder of Trinity Broadcasting Network	United States of America	
Nicky Cruz	Former gang member; now Assemblies of God minister. Author of autobiography Run Baby Run	United States of America	
Richard Dortch	Illinois District Superintendent (1971–83) when he joined PTL; the 2nd PTL executive to spend time in federal prison for his crimes related to the PTL scandal	United States of America	
Iliafi Esera	Senior Pastor of Faith City Church in Wanganui, NZ.; currently General Superintendent of the Assemblies of God in New Zealand and Assistant Superintendent of the AGNZ (2003–11)	New Zealand	
Andrew Evans	Previously Senior Pastor of Paradise Church; founder of the Family First Party and Member of the South Australian Legislative Council	Australia	
John Wesley Fletcher	Oklahoma City-based pastor	United States of America	Defrocked twice and convicted of perjury in charges stemming from the PTL scandal.
Israel Folau	Rugby league, rugby union, and Aussie rules footballer. Was raised Mormon, but converted to being an active member of an Assemblies of God fellowship in 2011.	Australia	Folau was criticized in the Australian media for faith-inspired anti-gay social media post.
Jason Frenn	Missionary-evangelist and author who holds citywide crusades throughout Latin America and the United States; an honorary member of the Luis Palau Evangelistic Alliance and hosts a daily live radio program with a million listeners on Radio Nueva Vida	Latin America and The United States	Has spoken to over 4.5 million people in live events and has seen more than 450,000 first-time decisions for Christ
Mickey Gilley	Rock-n-Roll and Country star, singer, pianist, guitarist	United States of America	Performed with cousins Jerry Lee Lewis and Jimmy Swaggart at the Ferriday First Assembly of God church (Ferriday, Louisiana)
Richard Grenell	Political commentator, Diplomat, U.S. Ambassador to Germany (2018–present)	United States of America	
Jessica Hahn	Church Secretary whose sexual involvement with Jim Bakker was one factor that triggered the PTL Ministry scandal and subsequent investigation	United States of America	
Steve Hill	Evangelist who led the Brownsville Revival in Pensacola, Florida in the 1990s	United States of America	
Benny Hinn	Televangelist, host of This Is Your Day on TBN; was ordained by the Assemblies of God in 1994, and subsequently resigned his ordination in 1996	United States of America	
Brian Houston	Senior Pastor of Hillsong Church	Australia	
Ben Hoyle	Current National Youth Facilitator A/G NZ and Director of Youth of the Nation NZ	New Zealand	
Tim Johnson	Politician, attorney, and real estate broker. Served in the U.S. House of Representatives from Illinois's 15th district from 2001 to 2013.	United States of America	
Jonas Brothers	Pop rock boy band	United States of America	Father Paul Kevin Jonas, Sr. is an ordained Assemblies of God minister and former pastor in Wyckoff, New Jersey
Johnny Key	Republican member of the Arkansas State Senate from Mountain Home in Baxter County	United States of America	
Phil Keaggy	Guitarist, singer, songwriter and founding member of rock band Glass Harp	United States of America	Two weeks after Keaggy's mother died in 1970 he became a Christian and attended a small Assembly of God Church in Boardman, Ohio
Sam Kinison	Controversial comedian in the late 1980s and early 1990s; before becoming a comedian, he was an Assembly of God evangelist	United States of America	
Jerry Lee Lewis	Rock-and-roll pianist, singer; at age 8 sang for Ferriday First Assembly of God Church (Ferriday, Louisiana), played at tent revivals	United States of America	Cousin to Jimmy Swaggart and Mickey Gilley
Linda Gail Lewis	Singer	United States of America	Sister to Jerry Lee Lewis, began performing with him at the Ferriday First Assembly of God church (Ferriday, Louisiana)
John Mahama	President of Ghana from 2012 to 2017 Reported to be raised Presbyterian, but is now an active member of the Assemblies of God/	Ghana	
Silas Malafaia	Pastor, author, and televangelist	Brazil	
Aimee Semple McPherson	Former Assemblies of God church planter and evangelist who later became the founder of the International Church of the Foursquare Gospel	United States of America	
Lemma Megersa	Minister of Defense	Ethiopia	Also a board member of the Assemblies of God in Ethiopia.
Scott Morrison	30th Prime Minister of Australia	Australia	
Marilyn Musgrave	Politician, attorney, and real estate broker. Served in the U.S. House of Representatives from Colorado's 4th district from 2003 to 2009.	United States of America	
Danny Nalliah	Pastor of The Fire Ministries in Melbourne, Victoria	Australia	
Ronaldo Nogueira	Pastor and politician, member of chamber of deputies	Brazil	
Sarah Palin	Former Governor of Alaska and GOP Vice President Candidate; attended an Assembly of God church for two decades until 2002	United States of America	
Margaret Peoples Shirer	Missionary to West Africa. Established the first Assemblies of God missions in Ghana. Translated the Gospels in local languages.	United States (born in Ireland)	
Everaldo Pereira	Pastor, businessman, and politician. President of the Social Christian Party (Brazil), candidate in the 2014 election.	Brazil	
Scott Perkins	Radio personality; known as the "Country Parson" to country music listeners in the Topeka, Kansas market; founding pastor of the FarmHouse Cowboy Church in Topeka.	United States of America	
David du Plessis	One of the founding fathers of the charismatic movement outside of the traditional Pentecostal churches	South Africa	
Elvis Presley (1935–1977)	"King of Rock & Roll," singer, actor, born in Tupelo, Mississippi; sang in choir at First Assembly of God and at camp meetings in Tupelo.	United States of America	
Samani Pulepule	Former Chief Apostle and General Superintendent of the World Samoan AG Fellowship (1966–2011); also Senior Pastor of the largest Samoan congregation in the world, Auckland Samoan Assembly of God, NZ	Samoa, based in New Zealand	regarded as one of the eldest serving pastor and superintendent in the Assemblies of God
Jane Russell	Hollywood actress	United States of America	Funeral was conducted by the Pacific Christian Center, an Assemblies of God congregation in Santa Maria, California
Gene Scott	Internationally known preacher, former president of University Network and helped found Oral Roberts University	United States of America	
Guy Sebastian	Pop, R&B, and soul singer-songwriter who attended Paradise Community Church; the first winner of Australian Idol (2003) and is a judge on the Australian version of The X-Factor	Australia	Has sung with the then Paradise Community Church Youth Conference Planetshakers
Marina Silva	activists and politician, presidential candidate in the 2010, 2014, and 2018 elections.	Brazil	Silva has been at times criticized by the church leadership for her leftist stance on many issues such as drug reform.
Kristy Starling	Contemporary Christian music artist; participant in Assemblies of God National Fine Arts Festival competition	United States of America	
Lester Sumrall	Former Assemblies of God minister; American Pentecostal pastor, evangelist, teacher, and missionary. Founded the Lester Sumrall Evangelistic Association (LeSEA) and its humanitarian arm LeSEA Global Feed the Hungry, World Harvest Radio International, and World Harvest Bible College. Considered to be the Father of Christian Television.	United States of America	
Jimmy Swaggart	Former Assemblies of God evangelist; televangelist, founder of Jimmy Swaggart Ministries, and gospel music artist	United States of America	Cousin to Jerry Lee Lewis and Mickey Gilley, began performing at the Ferriday First Assembly of God church (Ferriday, Louisiana)
Hidekazu Takayama	Pastor and politician, member of chamber of deputies	Brazil	
Todd Tiahrt	U.S. Representative from Kansas 4th District, graduate of Evangel College Springfield, Missouri	United States of America	
Gunnar Vingren	Founded the Assemblies of God in Brazil with Daniel Berg in 1911	Sweden	
Doug Wead	Former special assistant to George H. W. Bush and author; was once an Assemblies of God evangelist	United States of America	
José Wellington Bezerra da Costa	Current President of the Assemblies of God in Brazil	Brazil	
Smith Wigglesworth	Healing Evangelist, the "Apostle of Faith," instrumental in founding future Elim and Assemblies of God national fellowships; spoke at Assemblies of God conferences but never joined the organization	England	
David Wilkerson	Former Assemblies of God evangelist; founder of Teen Challenge, founder and pastor of independent Times Square Church in New York City from 1987 until the time of his death on 27 April 2011; famous for the book The Cross and the Switchblade, instrumental in conversion of Nicky Cruz	United States of America	
Bill Wilson	Leader of Metro Ministries International	United States of America	
George O. Wood	General Superintendent of the Assemblies of God (2007–2017)	United States of America	
