= Pentecostalism in Brazil =

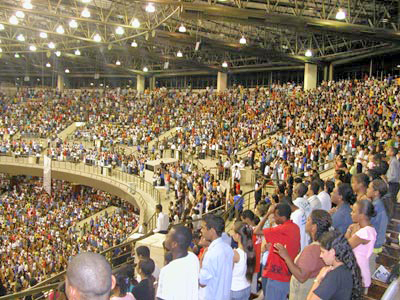
Pentecostal worship service in Rio de Janeiro

Pentecostalism is the fastest-growing Christian denomination in Brazil, with a community of believers in Pentecostal churches that has surged since the 1990s while the largest denomination, Roman Catholicism, has undergone a decline. At some points, churches were appearing as rapidly as one church per day. Pentecostalism in Brazil traces its roots to the Azusa Street Revival in 1906 in Los Angeles and, like Pentecostal movements in other countries, emphasizes a second act of grace following conversion that results in gifts of the Spirit such as glossolalia and healing. Despite a history dating only to the early 20th century, Pentecostalism became the dominant Protestant movement in Brazil by the late 20th century. Pentecostals have not formed a single unified church but comprise numerous denominations, including the Assemblies of God, Christian Congregation, Foursquare Gospel Church, Brazil for Christ, God is Love, and neo-Pentecostal groups such as the Universal Church of the Kingdom of God and New Life Church. These denominations exhibit minor doctrinal and organizational differences, target diverse social groups, and employ varied methods to achieve their goals. Many smaller Pentecostal denominations emerged primarily from internal splits within these major groups. Sociologists note that such fragmentation enhances Pentecostalism's competitiveness against traditional churches. The total number of Pentecostals in Brazil is estimated at 25.37 million.

== History ==
Scholars organize the Pentecostal movement in Brazil into three types, or "waves", organized by both time periods and doctrinal shifts. There may be up to a hundred million Pentecostals in Brazil.

=== First wave: the Assemblies of God, 1910–1950s ===
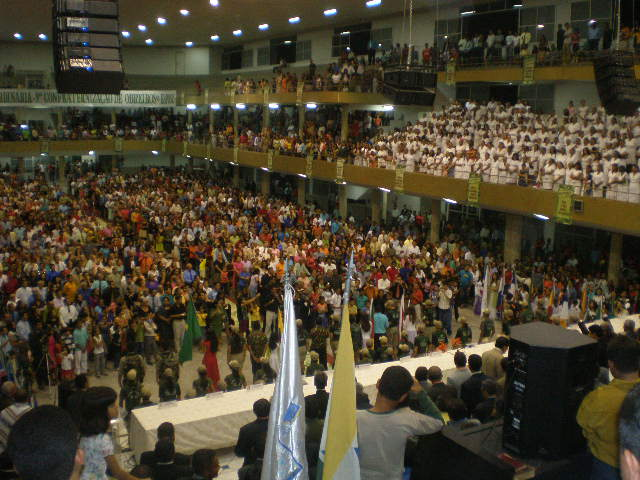
Assemblies of God in Imperatriz

The Pentecostal movement in Brazil began simultaneously in two locations, Belém and São Paulo, approximately 2,000 kilometers apart, with Europeans who converted to Pentecostalism in the United States as the first missionaries. These first Pentecostal churches emphasized gifts of the Spirit such as speaking in tongues, casting out demons, and prophesying. The movement gave rise to two major denominations: the Assemblies of God and the Christian Congregation.

In 1911, two Swedish missionaries, Gunnar Vingren and Daniel Berg, founded future Assemblies of God churches in northern Brazil, holding their first service on 13 June 1911 in Belém. Vingren and Berg, who had emigrated from Sweden to the United States in 1902 for economic reasons, encountered Pentecostalism in Chicago in 1909. Prompted by a vision and prophecy from their friend Olaf Uldin, they arrived in Belém in 1910 and joined a Baptist church, organizing prayer meetings to encourage members to seek the baptism of the Holy Spirit. The Baptist pastor prohibited their activities, arguing that such practices were limited to the apostolic era, leading to the expulsion of 18 supporters. Vingren and Berg avoided emphasizing social mobility or formal education because of their experiences of cultural marginalization in Sweden, which led to the development of national leadership within the Assemblies of God. From Belém, Pentecostalism spread across the northeast, but its southward expansion was slow, reaching São Paulo only in 1927. By 1930, the Assemblies of God had 15,000 members and became autonomous from Sweden, with churches in nearly every state in Brazil. That year, the church's headquarters moved from Belém to Rio de Janeiro, and leadership was transferred to Brazilian nationals. Vingren returned to Sweden in 1932. Post-1934 American missionaries began to arrive, but were generally not well-accepted in the existing national network of churches and missionaries virtually ceased post-1950s.

Until 1930, the Assemblies of God faced slow growth and significant obstacles. Efforts at proselytizing were met with hostility in Brazilian society, occasionally involving physical violence instigated by local elites. Loyalty to established churches, fear of social ostracism, and nationalism – since the missionaries were foreigners – hindered progress. Initially, Brazilian nationals played secondary roles, and leadership hesitated to transfer authority to them. This issue was resolved in 1930, marking the beginning of rapid growth, which accelerated in the 1950s. The Assemblies of God became Brazil's leading Pentecostal denomination and its largest Protestant church. In the 1940s, the denomination established its own publishing house.

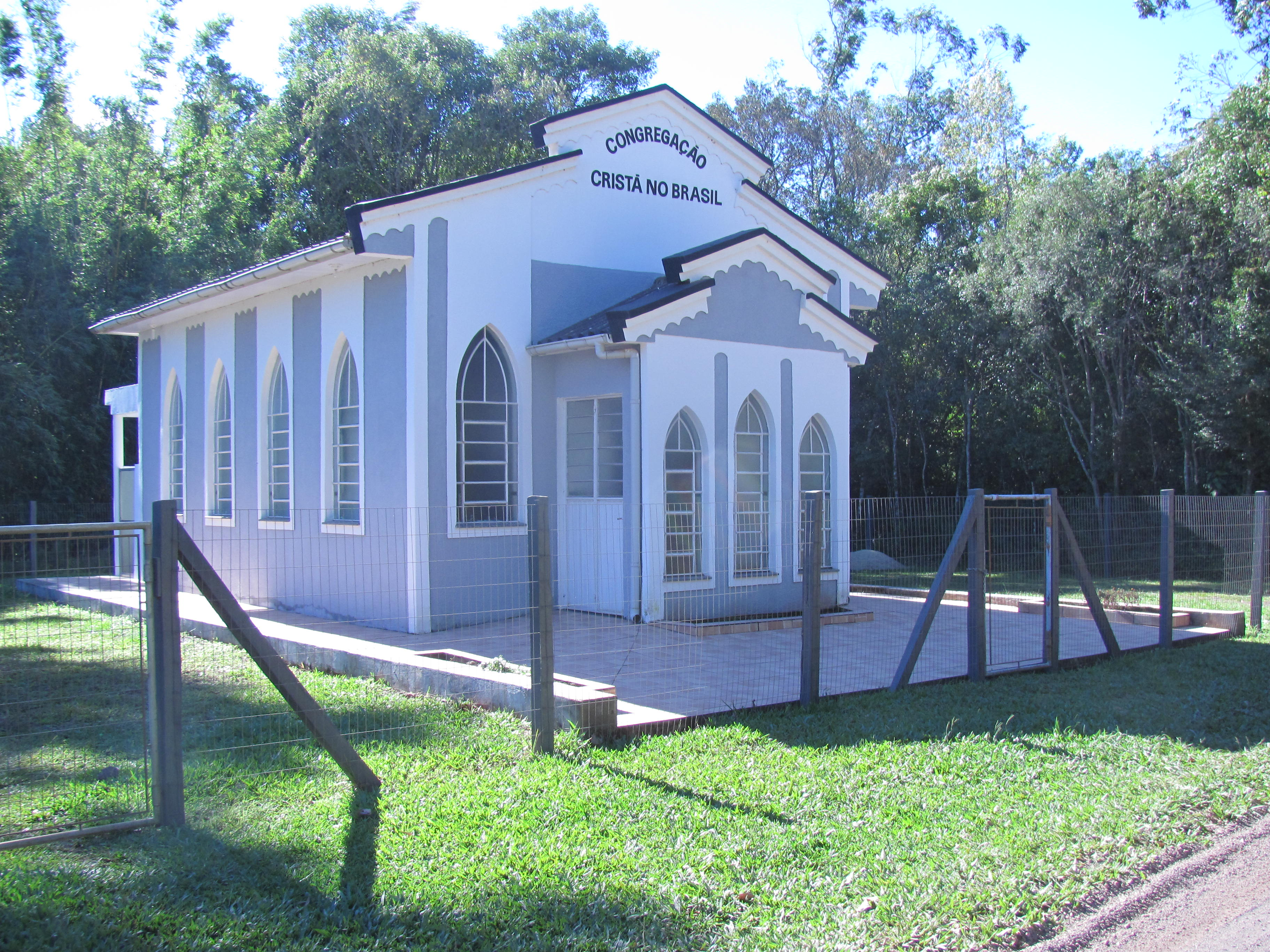
Christian Congregation in Osório

In 1910, an Italian man named Luigi Francescon founded a church in São Paulo which became the Christian Congregation in Brazil, a hub for Italian immigrants who comprised 48% of São Paulo state's population at the time. Francescon, who had experienced a Pentecostal awakening in Chicago in 1907, including speaking in tongues, traveled to Buenos Aires and then São Paulo following a vision. He preached at a Presbyterian church, but the pastor banned him from liturgical duties due to his Pentecostal teachings. Nevertheless, 20 members joined him to form the Christian Congregation. Initially growing among Italian immigrants, it adopted Portuguese for services in 1935. Growth has slowed since the 1940s, in part because it is primarily a rural and small-town church. The denomination avoids keeping statistics, citing an Old Testament prohibition on counting people, and opposes using literature, radio, or television for evangelism, as well as open-air evangelistic events. It lacks formal pastors, relying on elders and deacons, and sermons are unprepared, retaining an Italian-Brazilian character.

During the Great Depression in the 1930s, declining demand for Brazil's agricultural exports prompted industrialization. Industrial centers emerged in São Paulo and Rio de Janeiro, attracting migrants from across Brazil and driving urbanization. By 1970, 25% of Brazil's population lived in nine industrialized, densely populated regions. This industrial revolution paralleled the rise of Pentecostalism, which flourished in urban areas but remained limited in rural, agricultural regions. Sociologists suggest that urban migrants, free from rural social pressures and "feudal loyalty", were more open to changing their faith. The social upheaval encouraged migrants to seek new communities for identity, with Pentecostal churches providing one such option. (Note: This factor also influenced Chile, where C. L. D'Epinay observed that Pentecostalism appealed to rural migrants in cities due to changes in traditional social systems (Medcraft (1987, p. 75)).)

Despite the emergence of new denominations over a century, the Assemblies of God remained the largest Pentecostal denomination in the early 21st century. According to IBGE censuses, the Assemblies of God had 8.4 million adult members in 2000 and 12.3 million in 2010. Prolades reported 15,676,692 members in 116,000 congregations in 2010. Church data and the Brazilian Evangelical Association (AEVB) estimated 22.5 million members in 2011.

=== Second wave: the Foursquare gospel, 1954–1980s ===
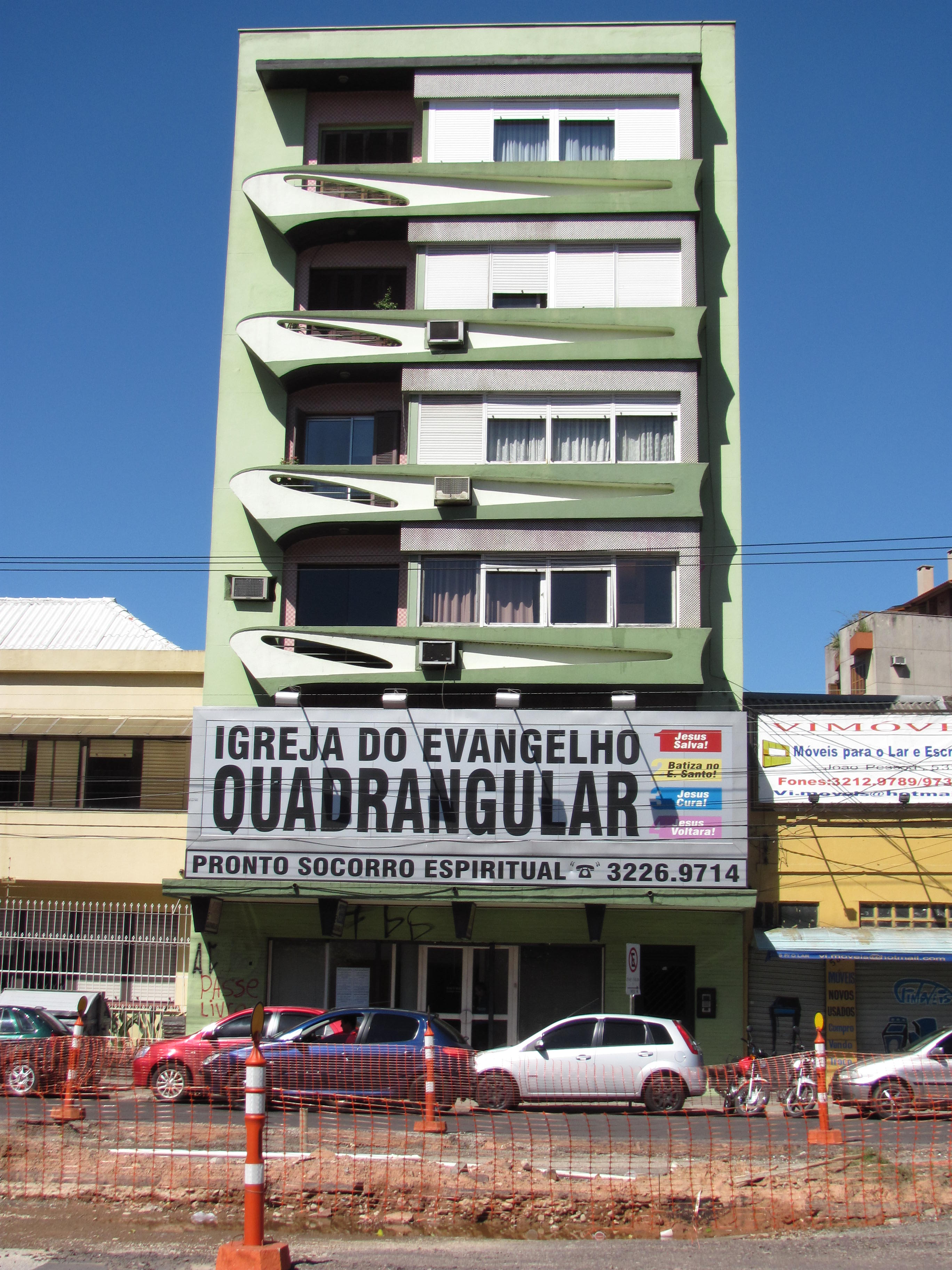
Foursquare Gospel Church in Porto Alegre

The epicenter of the second wave of Brazilian Pentecostalism was São Paulo, beginning in the 1950s. It differed from the first wave in its emphasis on healing as a gift of the Holy Spirit and its use of mass media to reach even greater parts of the Brazilian populace. Until the 1950s, the Assemblies of God and Christian Congregation were Brazil's only significant Pentecostal groups.

A former actor named Harold Williams helped start a Brazilian extension of Aimee Semple McPherson's L.A.-based Foursquare Gospel church in 1954. It would eventually be called the IEQ, after several restructures from the National Evangelization Crusade to the Crusade Church to IEQ. Williams conducted tent revivals in São Paulo, preached divine healing, and utilized media, attracting many Pentecostal pastors. Perhaps because of its association with the Foursquare church, 35% of the IEQ's pastors are women, making it unique among the historical Brazilian churches. By 1988, the church would become totally separate from the Los Angeles church. It also began experiencing significant growth in the 1980s and experienced significant growth, becoming one of the fastest-growing churches in Brazil. The denomination has a distinctly American character but showed greater tolerance for local customs than earlier groups.

Brazil for Christ (BPC) was founded in 1955 and was the first major Pentecostal church to be founded by a Brazilian. Manoel de Mello began as a preacher in the National Evangelization Crusade, but quickly left it to form his own church, modeled after the Chile for Christ church, after accusations of charlatanism. De Melo purchased radio airtime on major stations and, as an effective speaker, drew crowds of up to 100,000 during evangelistic campaigns. By 1963, he established 1,100 congregations and built a 25,000-seat temple in São Paulo. The BPC quickly became a staple in São Paulo religious life, even getting involved in politics (which most Pentecostal churches at that time left alone). It joined the World Council of Churches in 1969, the third Pentecostal group to do so after two Chilean denominations in 1961. By the 1980s, however, the church's influence had diminished greatly.

American preacher Robert McAlister initially worked with both the Assemblies of God and the Foursquare Gospel Church. His popular radio program led to the founding of the New Life Church in Rio de Janeiro in 1960. Uniquely, this denomination reaches the middle class, challenging sociologists' view that Pentecostalism primarily serves the working masses. In the 1960s, Pentecostalism began influencing traditional Protestant churches.

The God Is Love church (IPDA) belongs to the second wave, with its founding in 1962 by David Miranda, Manoel de Melo's brother-in-law, and use of the radio to reach large numbers of (mostly poor) Brazilians, but it precedes the Universal Church of the Kingdom of God in its reclamation of Catholic rituals and its attacks on religious beliefs based in Afro-Brazilian traditions like candomblé and umbanda. It faced strong competition from the Universal Church after 1977 and is known for constructing large temples.

The second wave coincided with urbanization, modernization, nationalism, and mass communication.

=== Third wave: The Universal Church of the Kingdom of God ===
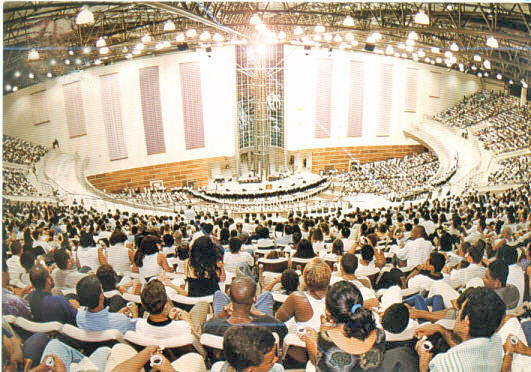
Catedral Mundial da Fé, Rio de Janeiro

The third wave of Pentecostalism is sometimes referred to as neo-Pentecostalism or post-Pentecostalism, and is generally associated with the Universal Church of the Kingdom of God (IURD). For this and several other churches like the International Grace of God Church, Rebirth in Christ established in 1986, and Evangelical Community Heal Our Earth founded in 1976, the focus moved to curing, prosperity, and spiritual warfare against the evil spirits which are believed to populate the world. In 2000, the Bola de Neve church emerged, lacking formal theology or liturgy and emphasizing work, surfing, and skateboarding. Its chapels feature surfboard imagery instead of crosses, yet it strictly enforces premarital chastity and prohibits drugs and alcohol. The church leverages media and spectacle, reflecting the rise of religious marketing in Brazil at the turn of the 21st century.

The IURD, commonly known as the Universal Church, was founded in Rio de Janeiro in 1977 by Edir Macedo. Founded during a military dictatorship and economic recession, it appealed to residents of cities like Rio de Janeiro hoping for an economic miracle. In 1989, Macedo and the IURD purchased TV Record for $52 million, at the time the Brazil's fifth-largest TV network, aiding in its evangelism. It has about one and a half million members, mainly located in Rio, São Paulo, and Bahia. The church also engages in publishing, producing the national newspaper Folha Universal with a circulation of 2.5 million, and owns a network of radio stations.

For many reasons, the church has faced heavy public criticism; one incident involved a bishop kicking the likeness of a popular saint. IURD does not view the Catholic church favorably, but it does not see it as the real enemy. It emphasizes spiritual warfare, in direct opposition to popular folk religions in Brazil like umbanda and candomblé, which have their roots in Afro-Brazilian traditions and involve communing with spirits. The IURD also emphasizes Prosperity theology, which has helped the church's popularity among poorer citizens of Brazil. After 1981, it grew rapidly, with one of its leaders elected to Brazilian National Congress in 1986, frequently appearing in the news. In 1989, it supported presidential candidate Fernando Collor de Mello. It later opposed Lula, labeling him the "devil's candidate". In the 1990s, it sought dominance within evangelical circles, cultivating ties with influential figures in other Protestant churches, such as Baptists. Between 1994 and 1995, Macedo clashed publicly with Presbyterian pastor Caio Fábio, founder and first president of the Brazilian Evangelical Association (AEVB). The Universal Church is Brazil's most controversial Pentecostal denomination, but ranks as the second-largest Pentecostal group. It conducts missionary work globally, including in Portugal, where it has also sparked controversy.

== Demographics ==
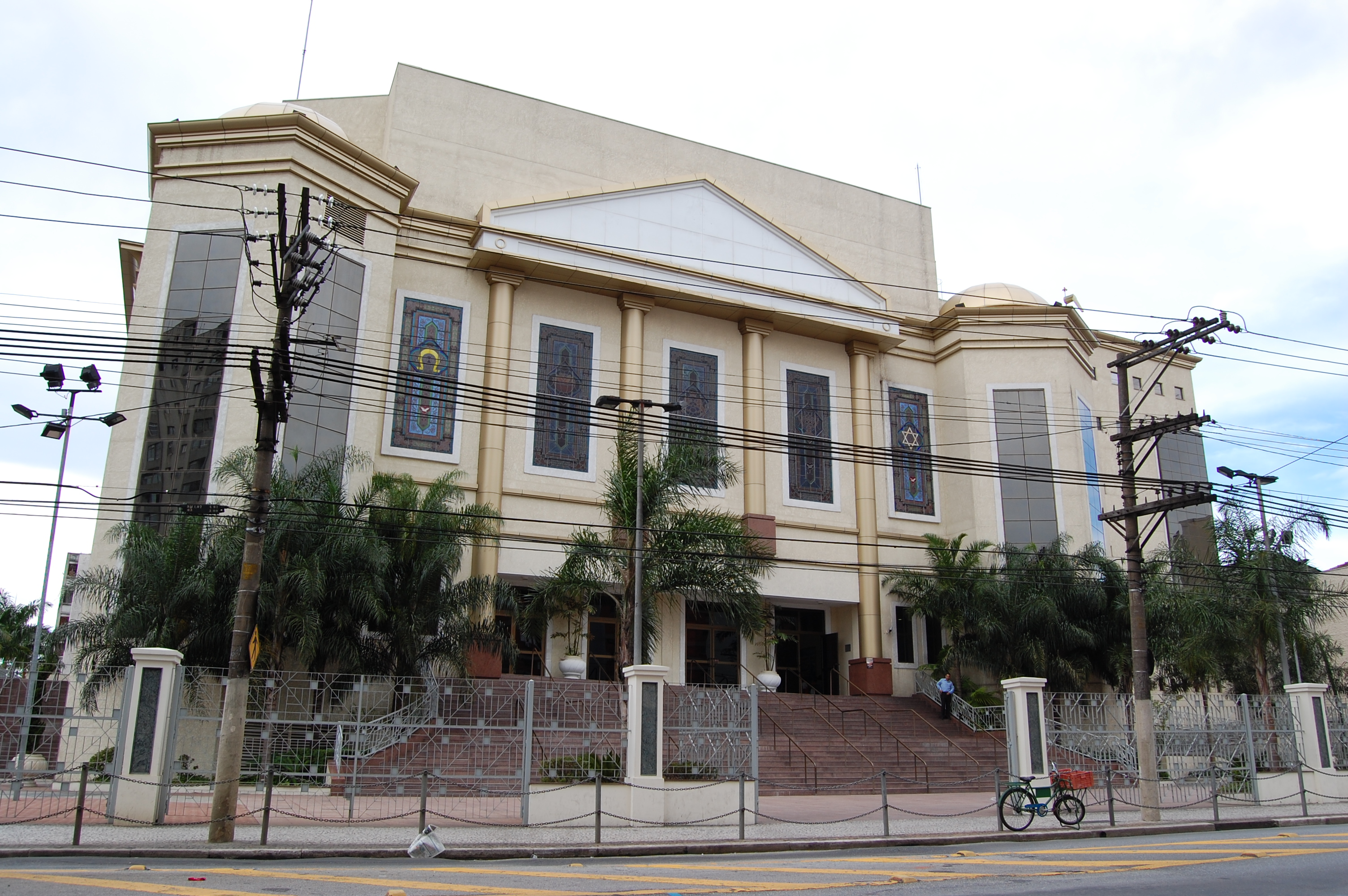
Universal Church in São Paulo

In 1965, American Presbyterian W.R. Read noted that over the previous 35 years, traditional Protestant churches, with hundreds of missionaries and millions of dollars, grew from 300,000 to 1 million members. In contrast, Pentecostals, with few missionaries and often no financial support, expanded from 100,000 to over 3 million. In 1965, 58% of Brazilian Pentecostals belonged to the Assemblies of God, 18.3% to the Christian Congregation, 6.7% to Brazil for Christ, and 17% to smaller groups. By 1974, Brazil had over 100 autonomous Pentecostal congregations. Between 1990 and 1992, Rio de Janeiro saw 710 new Protestant churches open, 91% of which were Pentecostal, while the Catholic Church opened only one parish.

Until the late 1970s, most Brazilian Protestants belonged to traditional denominations (Lutherans, Presbyterians, Methodists, and Baptists). Since then, Pentecostals have become the dominant Protestant group, with steady growth among Pentecostals and charismatics, particularly those preaching a prosperity gospel. Rio de Janeiro, Brazil's second-largest city, hosts the largest concentration of Pentecostals. In 1992, 91% of regular churchgoers in the city attended Pentecostal services, with churches thriving in poor urban neighborhoods. Sociologist Cecilia Mariz (1994) attributes Pentecostal growth to their ability to inspire Brazilians to cope with poverty, while anthropologist John Burdick (1993) links it to a "culture of possession". R. Andrew Chesnut, based on research in Belém, argues that Pentecostalism's offer of physical healing, unlike other churches, drives its appeal, with family crisis resolution also significant for women.

The 2010 IBGE census revealed that Pentecostal and charismatic denominations (Assemblies of God, Universal Church, New Life, and others) accounted for 60% of Protestants and 10.4% of Brazil's population, showing the fastest growth since 2000, while traditional Protestant churches stagnated. The census reported 25.37 million Pentecostals in 2010.

According to the 2010 census, 63.7% of Pentecostals from the Assemblies of God, Foursquare Gospel Church, and Universal Church earned below the minimum wage, compared to 59.2% of Catholics. Spiritists had the lowest percentage of low-income individuals. In rural areas, Catholics comprised 77.9% and Pentecostals 10.1% of the population; in urban areas, Catholics were 62.2% and Pentecostals 13.9%. Nationally, Catholics averaged 64.6% and Pentecostals 12.2%.

Pentecostalism's fragmentation stems from resistance to centralized structures, enabling social flexibility, strong local roots, and competitive rivalry. The Assemblies of God and Universal Church target similar social profiles (income, education, race) but offer distinct ecclesiastical approaches. New denominations adapt to current trends, music, and technology. The three waves of Brazilian Pentecostalism differ in theology, liturgy, and ethics.

Sandra Stoll (1983) analyzed Pentecostal political engagement from the 1960s to early 1980s, noting a predominantly right-wing orientation. Political involvement by Pentecostal evangelicals increased in the 1980s and 1990s.

== Pentecostal denominations and classification ==
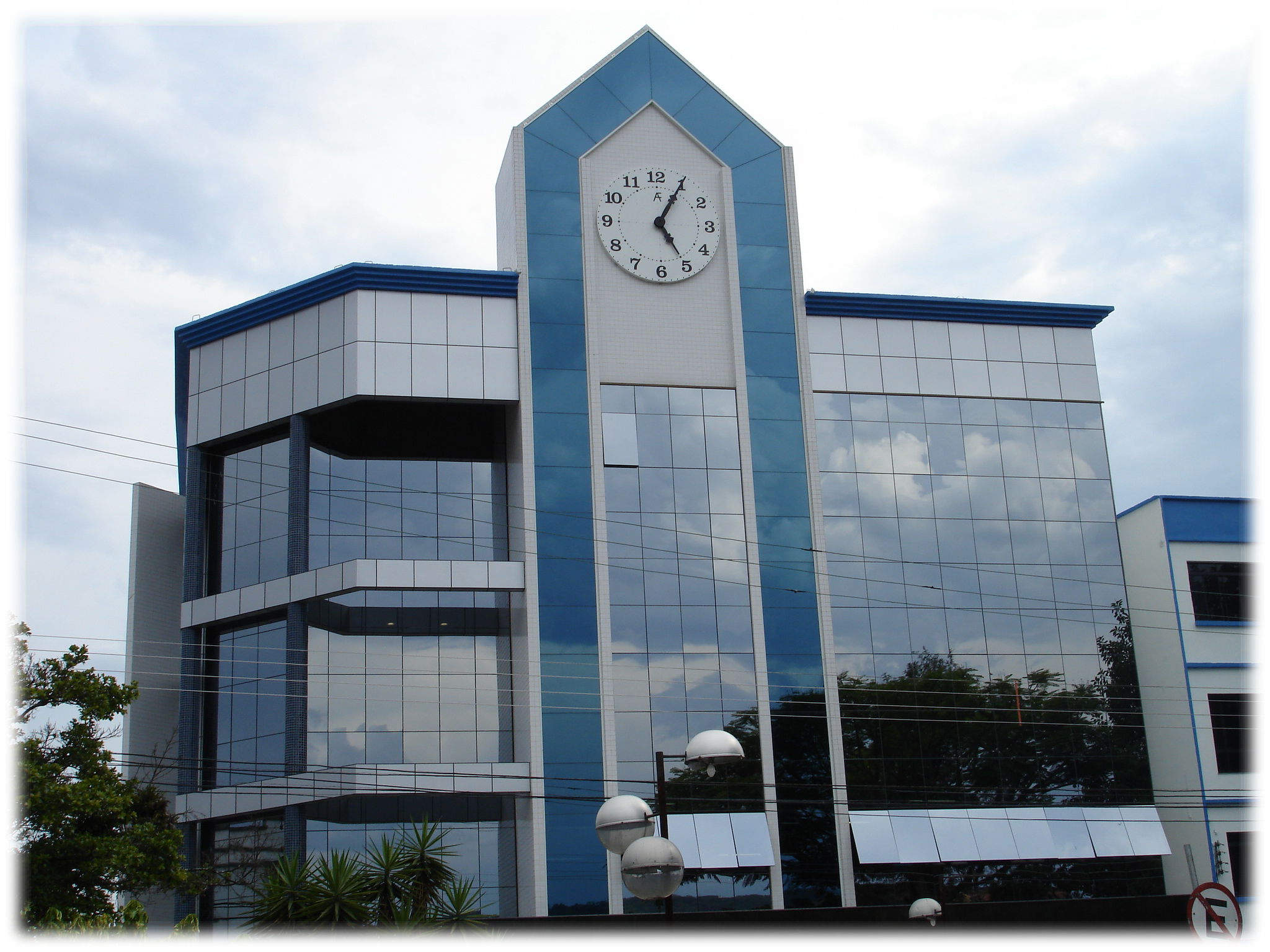
Assemblies of God in Criciúma

=== Classification challenges ===
In 1989, Mendonça divided Pentecostalism into classical and divine healing groups, classifying the Assemblies of God, Christian Congregation, Foursquare Gospel Church, and Brazil for Christ as classical, and God is Love as healing-focused, omitting the Universal Church. In 1994, Brazilian sociologist Bittencourt proposed three categories – classical, autonomous, and charismatic – based on global Pentecostal patterns. Classical denominations were those founded by American missionaries, autonomous ones emerged from internal dissent around strong leaders, and charismatic Pentecostalism arose from schisms within historical churches. This framework is less clear in Brazil, as the classical Assemblies of God and Christian Congregation were not American-founded, while the autonomous Foursquare Gospel Church is distinctly American. Paul Freston endorsed this classification in 1995, but in 1997, he noted that grouping middle-class and poor-focused churches together is a classification error. Internal denominational differences complicate alignment with standard criteria, making Pentecostalism a typological challenge for sociologists.

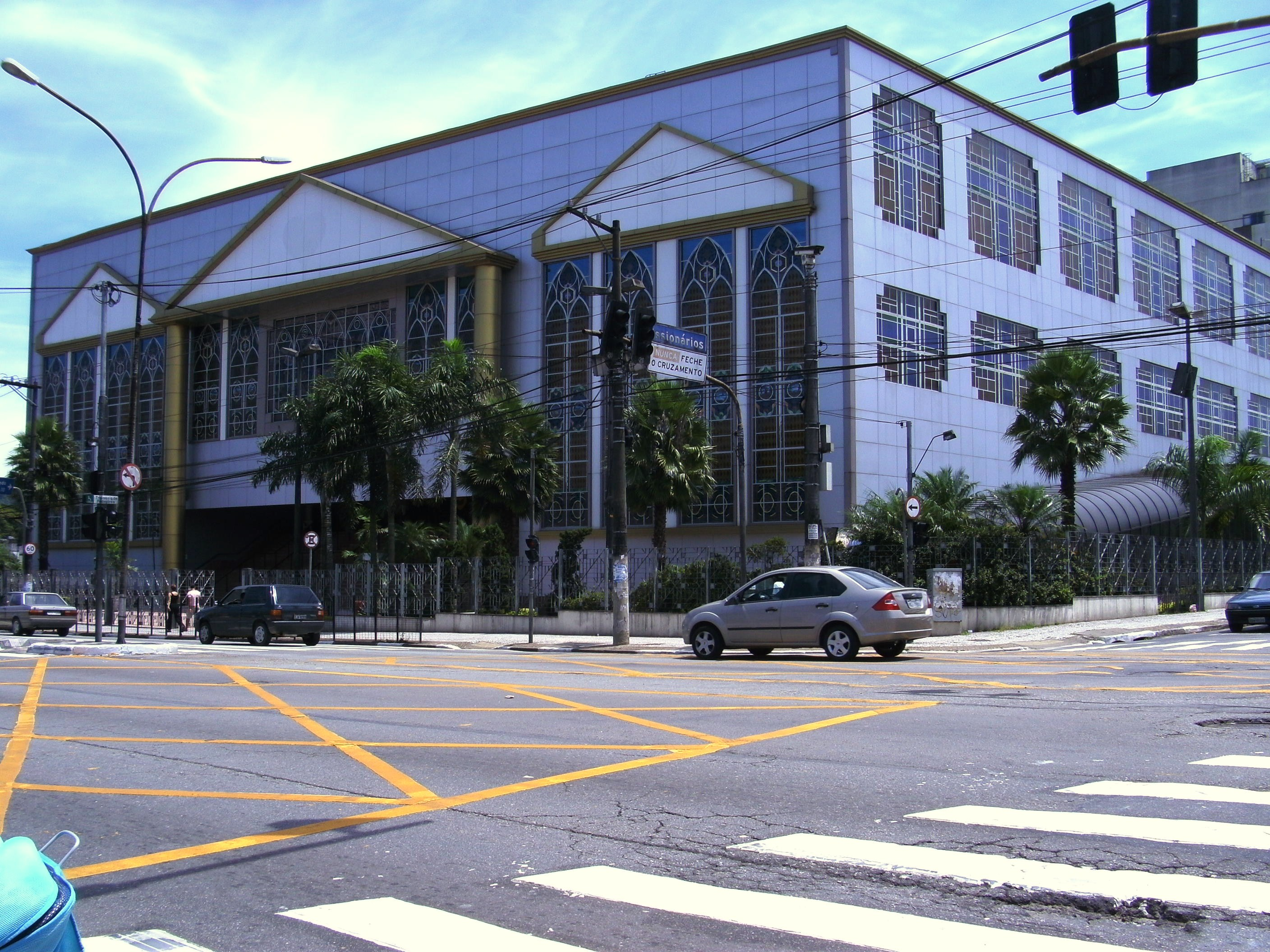
Universal Church in São Paulo

In 1997, Ari Pedro Oro outlined characteristics of Brazilian neo-Pentecostal denominations: appeal to the poor, independence from foreign control, charismatic leadership, isolation from broader Christianity, demonization of Afro-Brazilian religions, a client-like rather than communal membership model, emphasis on financial giving, use of electronic media, healing and exorcism rituals, political engagement, and national expansion. Charismatic leaders distinguish neo-Pentecostal churches from the Assemblies of God but see similarities with Brazil for Christ from the 1950s. The classical versus neo-Pentecostal distinction is also applied to Argentine and Central American Pentecostalism.

=== Classical Pentecostalism (first wave) ===
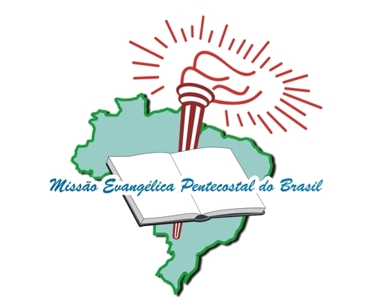
Logo of the Evangelical Pentecostal Mission of Brazil

- Assemblies of God (Assembleia de Deus) – 12.3 million members
- Christian Congregation (Congregação Cristã no Brasil) – 2.3 million members
- National Convention of the Assemblies of God in Brazil (Convenção Nacional das Assembleias de Deus no Brasil) – 2,000 members
- Church of God in Brazil (Igreja de Deus no Brasil), Cleveland – 48,000 members
- Evangelical Church of Biblical Revival (Igreja Evangélica Avivamento Bíblico) – 11,800 members
- Pentecostal Church of Christ in Brazil (Igreja de Cristo Pentecostal no Brasil) – 58,000 members
- Evangelical Pentecostal Mission of Brazil (Missão Evangélica Pentecostal do Brasil) – membership unknown

=== Autonomous Pentecostalism (second wave) ===
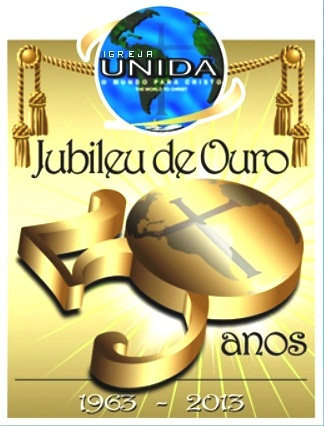
Logo commemorating the 50th anniversary of Igreja Unida

- Foursquare Church (Igreja do Evangelho Quadrangular) – 1,808,000 members
- Evangelical Pentecostal Church Brazil for Christ (Igreja Evangélica Pentecostal O Brasil Para Cristo) – 1,196,665 members
- God Is Love Pentecostal Church (Igreja Pentecostal Deus é Amor) – 845,383 members
- House of Blessing Church (Igreja Casa da Benção) – 125,000 members
- Evangelical Pentecostal United Church (Igreja Evangélica Pentecostal Unida), also United Church (Igreja Unida) – 50,898 members
- Evangelical Pentecostal Union Church (Igreja União Evangélica Pentecostal) – 51,000 members
- Christian Maranatha Church (Igreja Cristã Maranata) – 356,021 members
- Christian New Life Church (Igreja Cristã de Nova Vida) – 90,568 members

=== Neo-Pentecostalism (third wave) ===
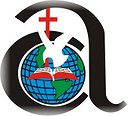
Logo of the Apostolic Church

- Universal Church of the Kingdom of God (Igreja Universal do Reino de Deus) – 1,873,000 members
- Blessed House Church (Igreja Casa de Bênção) – 125,550 members
- Grace Community (Comunidade da Graça) – 6,000 members
- Evangelical Community Heal Our Land (Comunidade Evangélica Sara Nossa Terra) – 180,130 members
- International Church of God's Grace (Igreja Internacional da Graça de Deus) – 168,000 members
- Apostolic Rebirth in Christ Church (Igreja Apostólica Renascer em Cristo) – 958,000 members
- Apostolic Fountain of Life Church (Igreja Apostólica Fonte da Vida) – 90,000 members
- Snowball Church (Bola de Neve) – membership unknown
- International Restoration Ministry (Ministério Internacional da Restauração) – 120,000 members
- World Church of God's Power (Igreja Mundial do Poder de Deus) – 168,539 members
- Rhema Bible Training Center (Centro de Treinamento Bíblico Rhema) – membership unknown
- Fountain of Life Church (Igreja Fonte da Vida) – 3,000 members
- Manna Church (Igreja Maná) – membership unknown

== Theology and politics ==
=== Theology ===
The church and the world are, if not completely opposing, two very distinct things to Pentecostals, who tend to be concerned with individual salvation and sanctification and so see the church as a community of faith nurturing that journey. Modern Pentecostal churches in Brazil also emphasize healing and driving out of demons versus the traditional mark of the gifts of the Spirit, glossolalia.

In Assemblies of God churches, tithing is an important part of their beliefs. It is seen as an empowering act which contradicts the giver's poverty because they could be spending their money on food or other items but are instead giving it to the poor.

In IURD, prosperity theology is central to their teaching. The church says that rewards for faith should be expected in this life, a teaching which becomes very plausible in the context of the urban poor which comprise much of IURD's membership. And while it separates wealth and salvation, the IURD emphasizes that entrepreneurship and perseverance are important parts of showing faith that God will provide.

=== Politics ===
Pentecostals comprise about 15% of all Brazilian Christians. Since Brazil's transition to a democracy, several Pentecostal churches have become involved in politics. Voting is compulsory in Brazil, but Pentecostal churches traditionally took a hands-off approach to politics, preferring to think of the church as apolitical until organizations like the Assemblies of God and the IURD entered politics and won several seats in the national Congress.

Pentecostal churches tend to emphasize a citizen's duty rather than their rights, and do not speak very much about citizenship. This is not, however, because they do not care about society, but rather because the churches provide immediate answers to problems found in the everyday lives of poor people, which leads to greater citizenship even if it not explicitly stated. And, while Pentecostals tend to be morally conservative, they are found across the political spectrum and can even lean to the political left on certain issues.

== See also ==
- Pentecostalism in Latin America

== Bibliography ==
- Freston, Paul (1999). "«Neo-Pentecostalism» in Brazil: Problems of Definition and the Struggle for Hegemony / Néo-pentecôtisme brésilien : problèmes de définition et luttes de pouvoir". Archives de sciences sociales des religions (in French). 105.
- Medcraft, John P. (1987). "The Roots and Fruits of Brazilian Pentecostalism" (PDF). Vox Evangelica. 17.
- Wulfhorst, Ingo (1995). "O Pentecostalismo no Brasil" [Pentecostalism in Brazil]. Estudos Teológicos (in Portuguese). 35 (1).
