= General Convention of the Assemblies of God in Brazil =

- Convenção Geral das Assembleias de Deus no Brasil
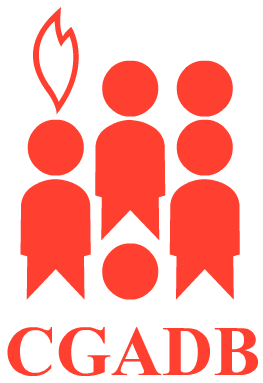
- Classification: Evangelical Christianity
- Theology: Pentecostal
- Associations: Assemblies of God
- Headquarters: Rio de Janeiro, Brazil
- Origin: 1930
- Congregations: 280,000 (2003)
- Members: 12 million (2013)
- Official website: cgadb.org.br

The General Convention of the Assemblies of God in Brazil (Portuguese: Convenção Geral das Assembleias de Deus no Brasil) is a Pentecostal Christian denomination in Brazil. It is affiliated with the Assemblies of God, specifically the Assembleias de Deus in Brazil. Its headquarters are in Rio de Janeiro.

== History ==
The General Convention of the Assemblies of God in Brazil has its origins in the mission work of Daniel Berg and Gunnar Vingren, two Swedish Pentecostal missionaries who arrived in Belém, Pará, in 1910. The denomination was officially founded in 1930. In 2003, it had 280,000 churches and 3.5 million members. In 2013, they had, according to themselves, 12 million members, being the largest national convention of the Assembly of God of Brazil.

== Controversies ==
In 2017, 10,000 churches left the Convention and founded the Convention of the Assembly of God in Brazil, due to the non-alternation of leadership and the prohibition of pastoral ministry of women.
