= Shirer =

Shirer is a surname. Notable people with the surname include:

- Margaret Peoples Shirer (1897–1983), American missionary
- Priscilla Shirer (born 1974), American author
- William L. Shirer (1904–1993), American journalist and war correspondent
