= Hidekazu Takayama =

Brazilian politician

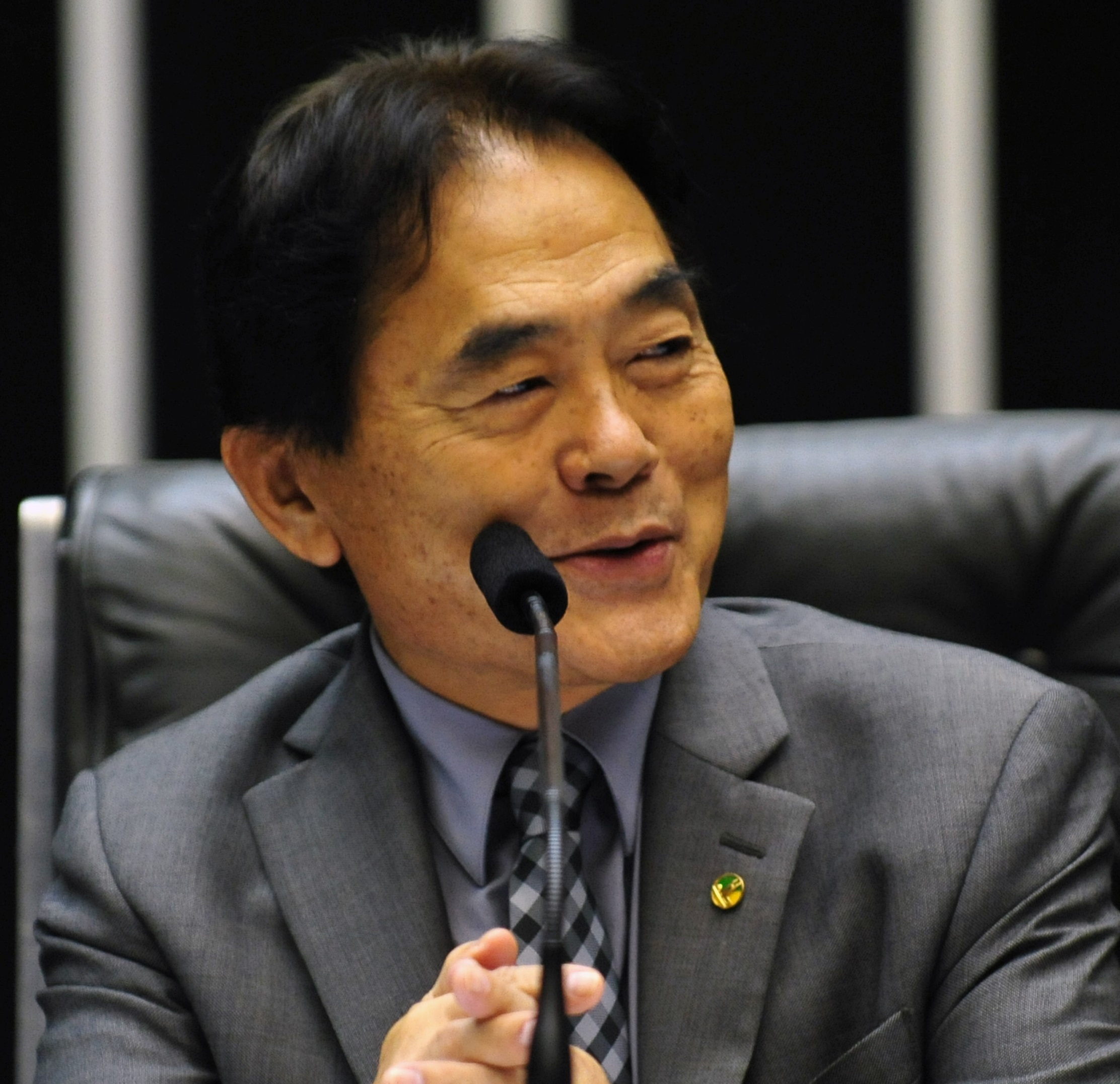
- Takayama in April 2013

Federal Deputy for Paraná
- In office 1 February 2003 – 31 January 2019 Elected years 2002, 2006, 2010, 2014

State representative for Paraná
- In office 1 February 1996 – 31 December 2003 Elected years 1994 (substitute), 1998

Councilor of Curitiba
- In office 1 January 1989 – 31 January 1993 Elected year 1988

Personal details
- Born: 20 March 1948 (age 78) Rolândia, Paraná, Brazil
- Party: PSC
- Other political affiliations: PAN

Hidekazu Takayama (born 20 March 1948) is a Brazilian politician and pastor from Rolândia, having served as city councilor and state representative.

== Early life ==
Takayama was born to Antonio Izami Takayama and Maria Schizuka, and is a third-generation Japanese Brazilian. He is a pastor of the Assembleias de Deus church.

== Political career ==
In 2015 Takayama had to be hospitalized with an edema in his right eye and a cut in his mouth after he was punched by the driver of Delcídio Amaral at the entrance of parliament. According to reports, Amaral's vehicle was blocking the entrance, to which Takayama and his companions confronted his driver, who after being manhandled responded by forcefully punching Takayama.

Takayama voted in favor of the impeachment against then-president Dilma Rousseff. However, Takayama would later back Rousseff's successor Michel Temer against a similar motion.

In April 2017 Takayama replaced João Campos as leader of the union of evangelical politicians in the Brazilian legislature, which campaigns for the conservative evangelical stances on issues, most notably opposition to same-sex marriage and unions.
