= Casa Publicadora das Assembléias de Deus =

Brazilian Christian publishing house

Casa Publicadora das Assembléias de Deus (CPAD; Portuguese for Publishing House of the Assemblies of God) is a Brazilian Christian publishing house. Its activities officially began in March 1940, when it gave its legal organization in the city of Rio de Janeiro. It is an administrative organ and linked ministerially to the General Convention of the Assemblies of God in Brazil (CGADB), currently being chaired by pastor José Wellington Bezerra da Costa. The Board of directors the company is chaired by José Wellington Costa Junior and executive management by Ronaldo Rodrigues.
