= Pentecostalism in Latin America =

Religious movement in Latin America

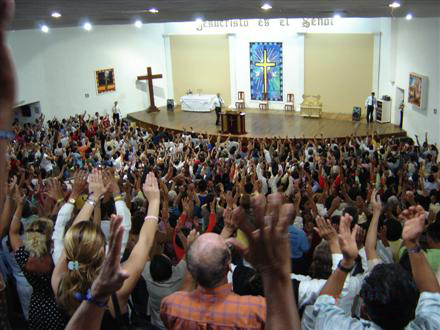
Congregation in Veracruz, Mexico, founded by Brazilian missionaries from the Universal Church

Pentecostalism in Latin America refers to the Pentecostal movement in Latin America. It is the second largest religious movement in the region, with approximately 30% of the population identifying with it, including the charismatic movement within the Catholic Church and Protestant churches. Pentecostals are the fastest-growing Christian denomination, exerting a stronger influence in Latin America than in any other region worldwide. Pentecostalism is not a unified movement and has never formed a single structure encompassing all believers, with various branches often competing with one another.

The Pentecostal movement first reached Chile on 12 September 1909, followed by Argentina and Brazil in 1910, Peru in 1911, Nicaragua in 1912, Mexico in 1914, and Puerto Rico and Guatemala in 1916. It later spread to other Latin American countries. Scholars disagree on the reasons for its rapid growth, citing factors such as political support from the United States, social advancement of adherents, and environmental adaptation.

Initially, Pentecostals showed little interest in social issues and declared political neutrality. As their numbers grew, so did their engagement with these matters. Latin American Pentecostalism has been studied by scholars such as Emilio Willems (1967), Christian Lalive D'Epinay (1968 and 1975), David Martin (1990 and 2002), André Corten (1995), Jean-Pierre Bastian (1997), Timothy J. Steigenga (2001), and William Mauricio Beltrán Cely (2010).

== Main streams of Pentecostalism ==
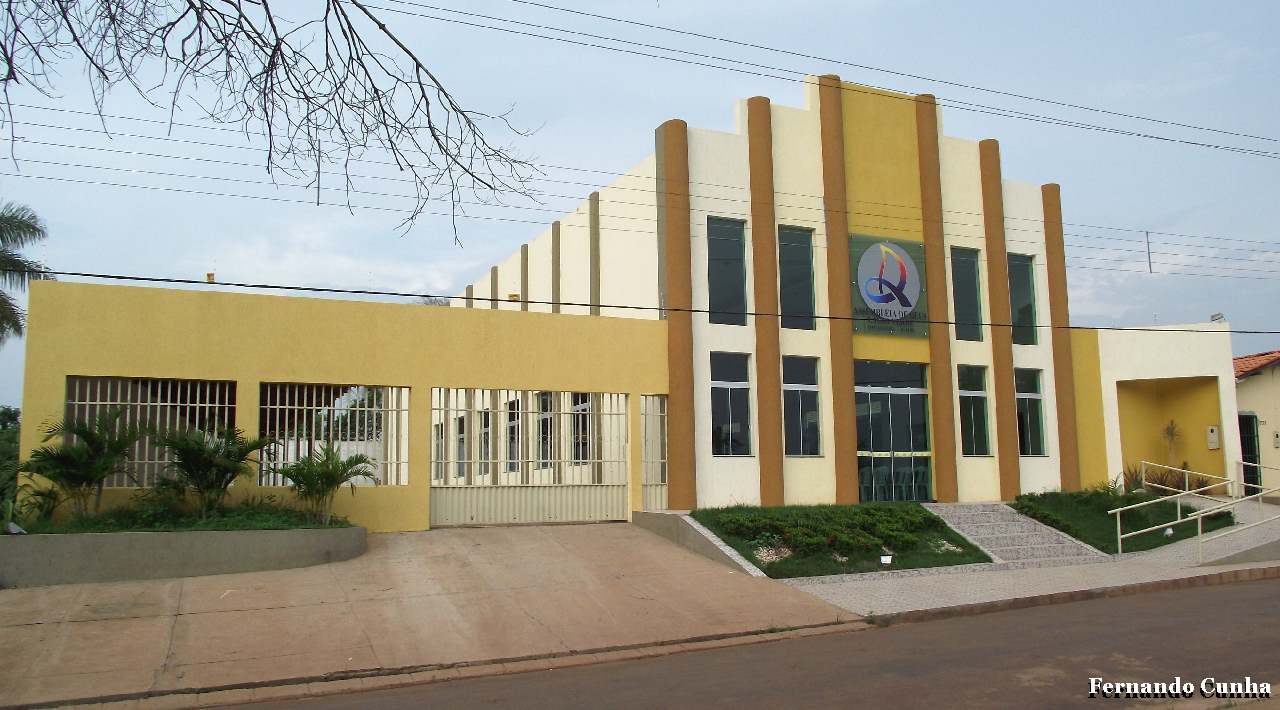
Assembleias de Deus in Lago Verde, Maranhão

The first Pentecostal denominations in Latin America were established before the major denominations in the United States. Consequently, American Pentecostalism did not shape the movement in countries like Chile, Argentina, and Brazil, though it influenced Central American countries, where it still differs from its American counterpart. Scholars note that Latin American Pentecostalism cannot be classified in the same way as North American Pentecostalism.

Vinson Synan identifies five groups within Pentecostalism: classical Pentecostals (Assemblies of God, Church of God), Protestant charismatics, Catholic charismatics, independent Pentecostals, and indigenous churches in the Third World, most of which are Pentecostal. Carmelo E. Alvarez categorizes three groups: churches founded by immigrants (e.g., Christian Congregation in Brazil), which were independent from the start; churches established by foreign missions (often from the US), initially reliant on external funding but later independent, shaped by North American models; and indigenous churches with no ties to foreign denominations or funds. Pentecostals in historical Protestant churches and the Catholic Church are classified as a separate group – neopentecostals.

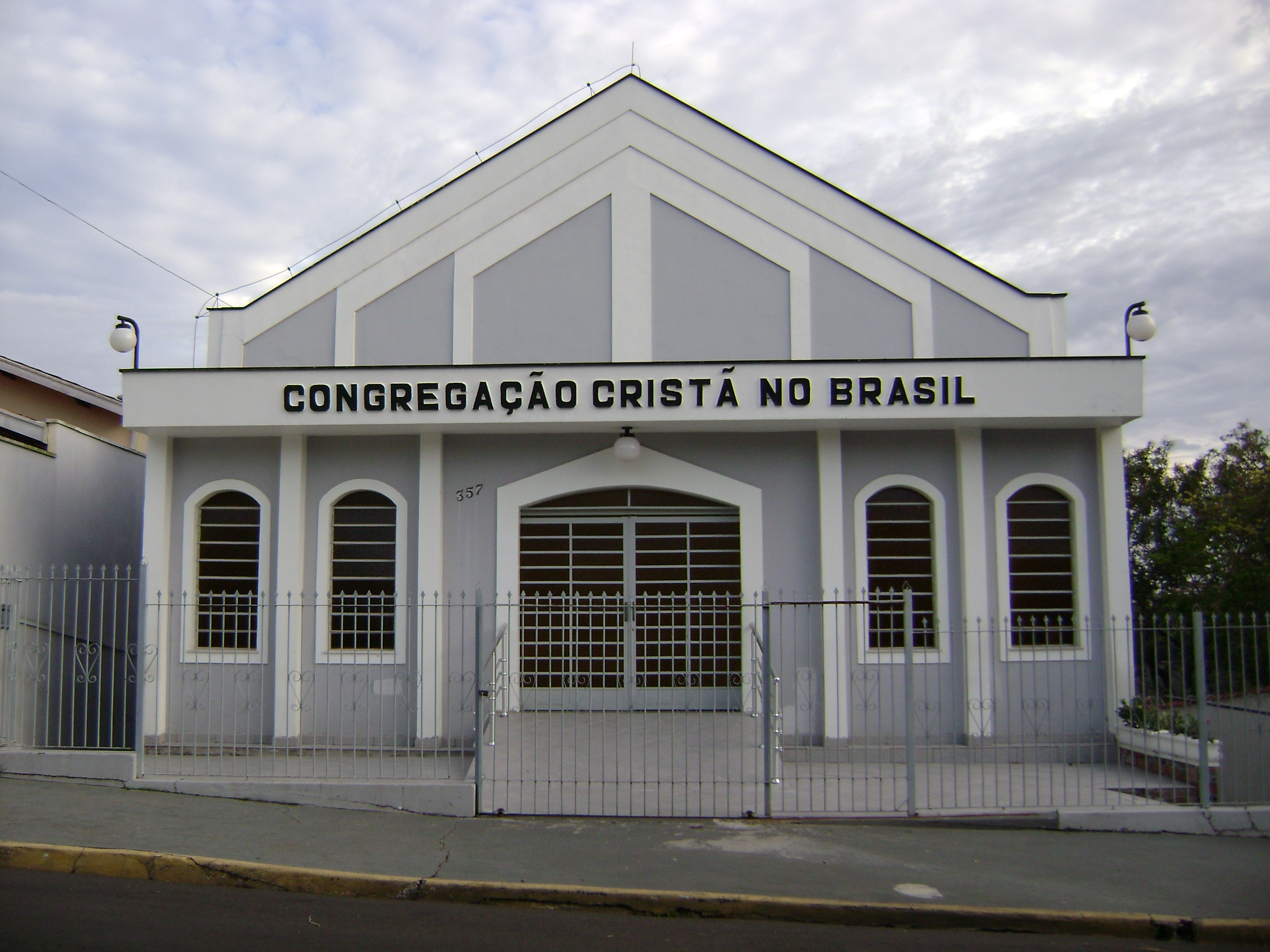
Christian Congregation in Águas de São Pedro

Sociologist William Mauricio Beltrán Cely identifies three main streams of Pentecostalism in Latin America, which, despite similarities, differ in teachings on life and salvation. The first includes denominations from the early 20th century with a fundamentalist character. The second comprises neopentecostal (charismatic) churches, sharing traits with the prosperity gospel. The third has sectarian characteristics. Each stream has its own theology, recruitment methods, and community structure.

The first stream is closely tied to Protestantism and marked by radicalism, rooted in the 19th-century holiness movement, seeking a return to primitive Christianity in opposition to liberal theology. Conversion entails renouncing worldly pleasures, such as alcohol, dancing, fashion, cinema, and secular music, with violations risking expulsion. The world is seen as evil, requiring believers to separate themselves and adopt the role of Christ's soldiers, limiting social contacts. Membership does not guarantee salvation.

The second stream is less radical, allowing greater freedom in dress and behavior, with a more universal and conformist doctrine. Poverty, unemployment, health issues, and other misfortunes are attributed to a lack of faith. A key practice is "giving to receive a hundredfold", with high tithing and donations for charitable causes. Prosperity is viewed as God's blessing. Despite differences, distinguishing between Pentecostals and charismatics is challenging, as fundamentalists dominate among Pentecostals but are a minority among charismatics. Pentecostals are more institutionalized, originating in the 1890s–1920s, while charismatics emerged in the 1950s–1960s.

The third stream incorporates local beliefs, both indigenous and African, emphasizing miracles (especially exorcisms) and practices to achieve them, with personal testimonies central and little focus on eternal salvation.

The largest Pentecostal denomination in Latin America is the Assemblies of God, predominant in Brazil, Venezuela, Peru, Bolivia, Paraguay, Uruguay, and several Central American countries.

Pentecostals emphasize the autonomy of local congregations and oppose hierarchical, centralized church structures, though communities collaborate, organizing global and local Pentecostal congresses. Religious experience outweighs doctrine in the Pentecostal movement, and centers on the "baptism in the Holy Spirit" and manifestations like glossolalia, healing, and prophecy as direct evidence of faith.

== Significance and influence ==
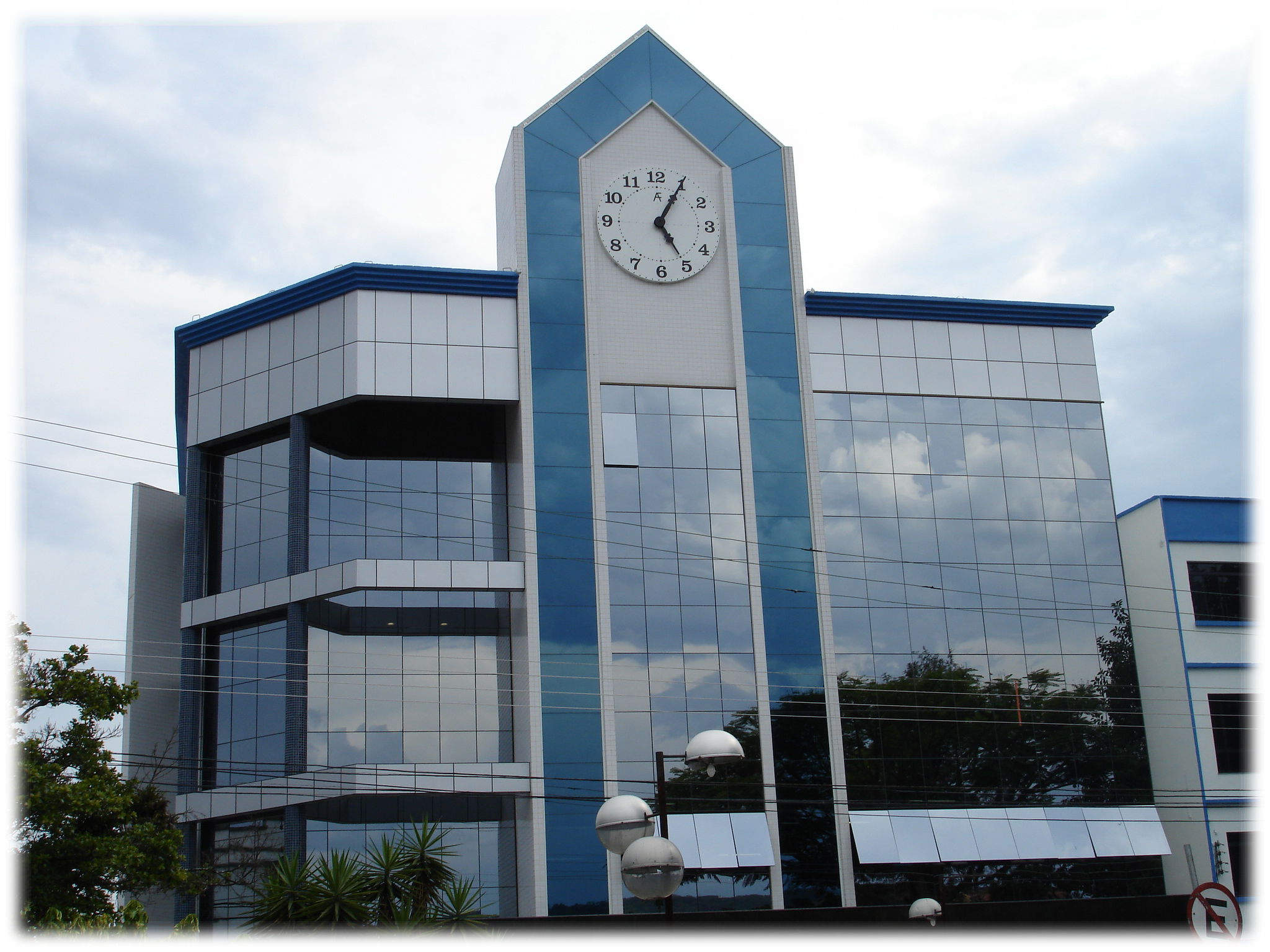
Assemblies of God in Criciúma, Brazil

Pentecostalism began playing a significant political role in Latin America from the 1980s. By 5 October 2006, Guatemala had two Pentecostal presidents, about 10% of Brazil's parliamentarians were Pentecostals, Chile's Pentecostals annually organized Independence Day events, and in Nicaragua, Pentecostals formed a political party that ran a presidential candidate and won congressional seats.

The movement's growth coincided with regional democratization. On 1 January 1976, only nine countries were considered free, while 18 were unfree or partially free. By 1 January 2006, 22 were free, and 11 were unfree or partially free. Democratization enabled social groups, including Pentecostals, to organize.

The Catholic Church often held a privileged position, supported by governments through religious education in schools and exclusive access to hospitals and the military, sometimes into the late 1990s. Pentecostals engaged in politics to end Catholic privileges or secure equal rights for Protestants.

Issues like abortion and homosexuality were not cultural battlegrounds as in the US, given the region's conservatism. Center and left-wing groups in some countries pushed for liberalization, prompting Pentecostal political mobilization. In Brazil in 1986, efforts to block liberalization on homosexuality succeeded, but those on abortion failed.

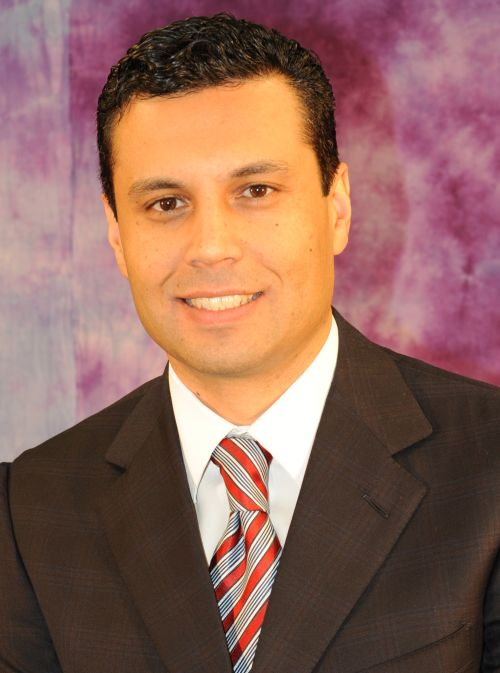
Renato Cardoso, Brazilian televangelist

Politicians increasingly courted Pentecostal voters. On 1 November 2002, Luiz Inácio Lula da Silva openly sought Pentecostal and evangelical votes. On 15 March 2005, Brazil's Workers' Party, co-founded by Lula, allied with the Republican Party, backed by the Universal Church of the Kingdom of God.

Criticism emerged as Pentecostal influence grew. Pope John Paul II called their rise an "invasion of sects", undermining Catholic culture and societal cohesion, on 15 March 1992. Pentecostal leaders, including a former Guatemalan president, labeled the Catholic Church a source of corruption and backwardness. Leftists accused Pentecostals of serving US economic and political interests.

Due to its diversity, assessing Pentecostalism's political impact is complex. Some scholars see clear influence, while others note conflicting views, describing Pentecostals as politically passive or right-wing and authoritarian. By 5 October 2006, Pentecostals significantly influenced politics in Brazil, Chile, and Guatemala, with distinct impacts in each, likely deepening long-term. Sociologist Miguel Ángel Mansilla described Brazilian, Peruvian, and Ecuadorian Pentecostals as engaging in political guerrilla tactics, while Chilean Pentecostals stood out positively. Pastor Juan Sepúlveda argued, based on Chilean Pentecostals, that they exhibit pluralism, spanning left, right, or apolitical stances.

== Social issues and politics ==
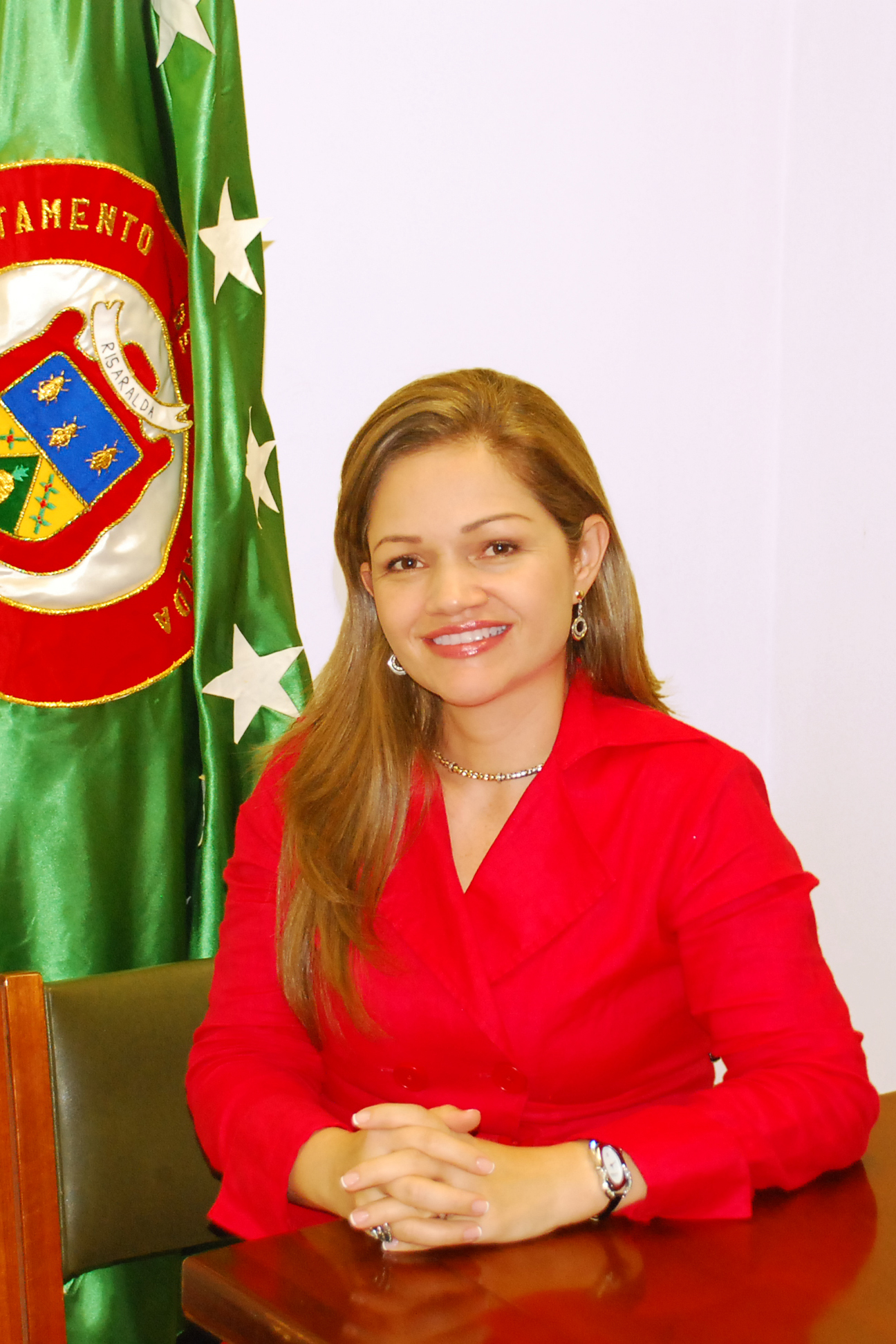
Martha Cecilia Alzate, deputy in Colombia's House of Representatives

=== Politics ===
Initially, Pentecostals avoided politics. Lalive d'Epinay, studying Chilean Pentecostals in the 1960s, found 50% of pastors banned union membership, 64% believed the church should avoid politics, and 85% prohibited political involvement. D'Epinay concluded Pentecostals supported the status quo, a view shared by others. David Martin in the 1990s described Pentecostalism as apolitical. However, social engagement later increased, making Pentecostals visible in public spheres.

Pentecostals show political pluralism. Influences include US impact, their representation of marginalized groups, Catholic culture, Pentecostal theology, and divides between leaders and followers. Sean Samuel O'Neil noted US influence, particularly in Guatemala and Nicaragua, though it can be overstated. Pentecostals range from conservative to progressive, occasionally adopting Catholic elements like corporatism in Chile and Brazil's "Brazil for Christ" denomination. Critics attribute controversial decisions by Pentecostal politicians to literal biblical interpretations.

Pentecostals are less politically active than Catholics and traditional Protestants.

=== Women's emancipation ===
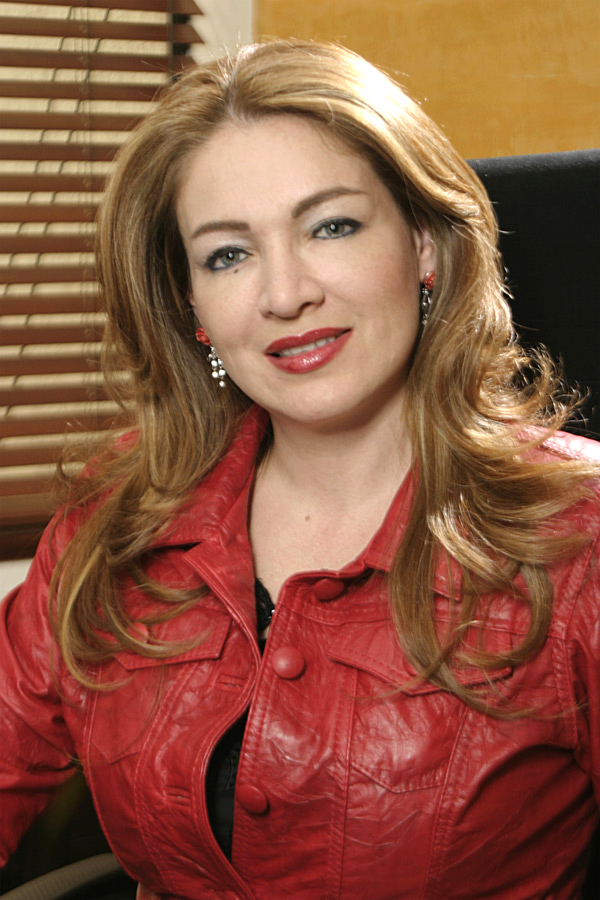
Alexandra Moreno, Colombian senator since 2002, lawyer, co-founder of the MIRA party, and neopentecostal activist

Latin American culture, rooted in Mediterranean Catholicism, historically excluded women from public life and church leadership. Liberation theology and Pentecostalism challenged this. Pentecostalism enabled women's activity beyond the household, with women's meetings, leadership in mixed gatherings, faith healing, church planting, and missionary work. On 15 November 1975, Cornelia B. Flora noted that Pentecostal women could achieve higher status than men due to roles based on charisma, like preaching.

Flora's study on 15 November 1975 in Colombia showed Pentecostalism elevating women's status among the poorest classes. Edward Cleary in 1992 suggested Pentecostalism often boosts women's social activity. Women play significant roles, though not at the highest levels, enjoying more autonomy than formal structures suggest. Many husbands, influenced by wives, join churches, abandon machismo, take family responsibilities, and treat spouses as equals. Sociologists note Pentecostalism's role in women's emancipation in a machismo-dominated world.

Latin American Pentecostalism promotes strong families, responsible husbands, and spousal equality, rejecting moral relativism and emphasizing fidelity and responsibility. Conversion fosters mobilization and self-worth, positively impacting marriage, health, work, and education.

=== Zionism ===
Pentecostals differ from Catholics and traditional Protestants in their support for Israel and Zionism, driven by dispensationalist eschatology from the Plymouth Brethren. This is prominent in Central America, attributed to US proximity or the late-19th-century Central American Mission, which popularized dispensationalism. Venezuelan Pentecostals also support Zionism, despite the country's anti-Israel stance, providing theological backing for Israel. In Chile, indigenous Pentecostals (Methodist Pentecostals) show mild pro-Zionist leanings, stronger among those influenced by American Pentecostalism.

Per Pew Forum on 5 October 2006, in Brazil, nine classical Pentecostals supported Israel for every one supporting Palestinians; in Guatemala, the ratio was 20:1, and in Chile, 7:1. Neopentecostal support for Israel was lower in all three.

=== Fundamentalism ===
Pentecostalism shares traits with Christian fundamentalism, believing God acts throughout history. Unlike other fundamentalists, Pentecostals emphasize experience, believing miracles from the Acts of the Apostles occur today. This allows women leadership roles, verified by experience rather than doctrine.

== Statistics and demographics ==
La Luz del Mundo, Guadalajara, Jalisco

Pentecostalism grew rapidly in Latin America from the 1960s. In 1970, Pentecostals and charismatics comprised 4% of the population. By 1 January 2005, per World Christian Database, there were 75 million Pentecostals (13%) and 80 million Protestant and Catholic charismatics (15%).

Pentecostals and charismatics per World Christian Database

#	1900	1970	1990	2005
Million	0.01	12.6	118.6	156.9
%	0.0	4.4	26.9	28.1

In 2005, Pentecostals exceeded 10% of the population in Brazil, Chile, Argentina, Guatemala, El Salvador, and Nicaragua, with rapid growth in Mexico, Colombia, and Peru. By 2025, Catholics may constitute only 50% of Latin America's population.

Since 1989, growth has slowed. Juan Kessler noted in Costa Rica that 8.1% of adults were former Protestants in 1989, rising to 12% by 1991, with 62% becoming Catholics and 31% unaffiliated. In Mexico, 43% raised Protestant left by adulthood. Kurt Bowen attributed high dropout rates to sectarian zeal (asceticism, charismatism), with 68% of 1980s Protestant converts in Mexico leaving by 1990. Kessler cited poor pastoral training, Bowen excessive demands. Steigenga predicted a balance between new and departing members.

In Costa Rica and Guatemala, Steigenga found 13% of non-religious individuals had spoken in tongues, 37% experienced personal conversion, and 57% reported miraculous healings, suggesting prior evangelical ties but departure due to aversion to organized religion.

== Reasons for Pentecostal growth ==
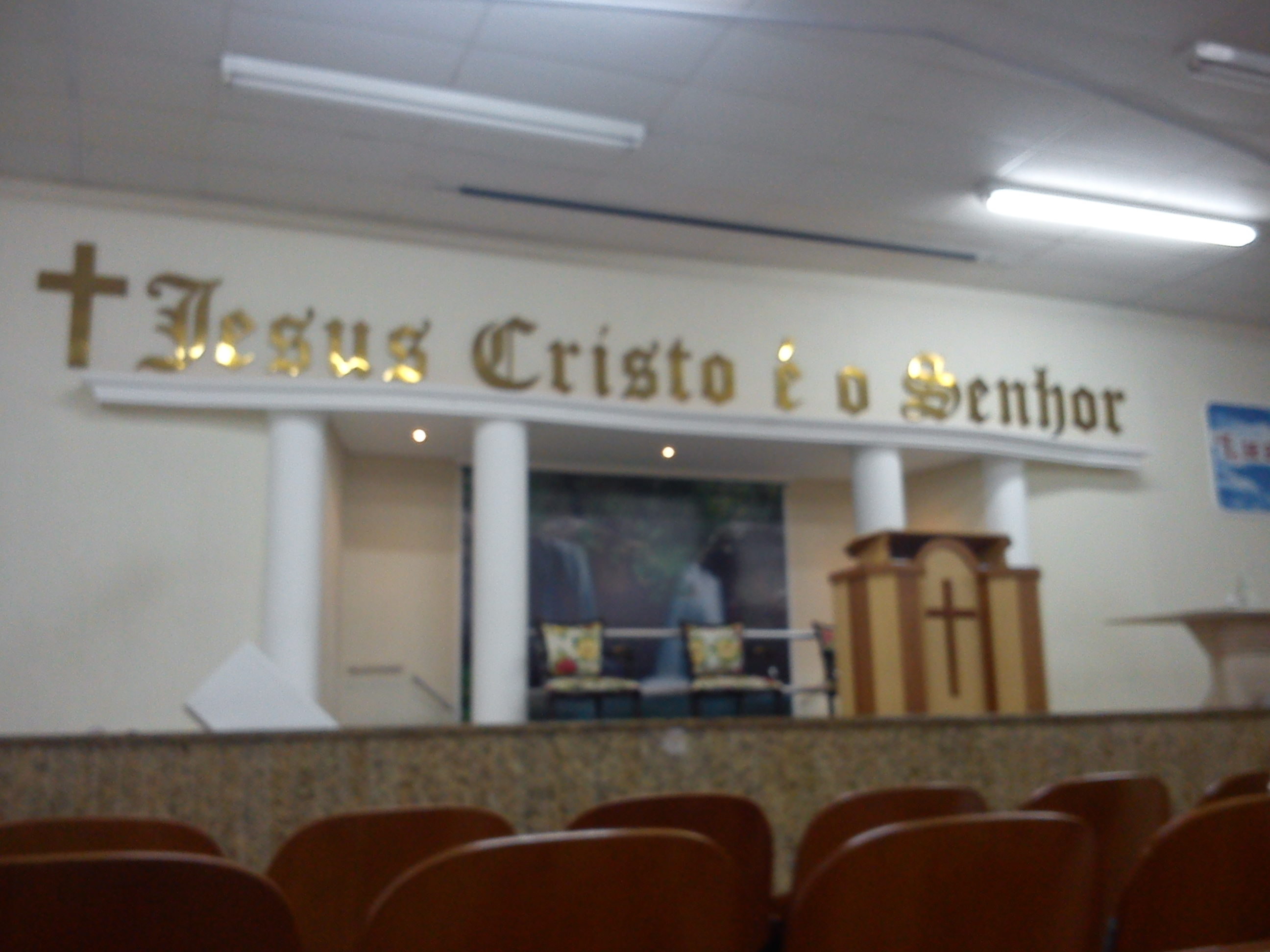
"Jesus Christ is Lord", a neopentecostal slogan

For three centuries, Spain and Portugal blocked non-Catholic religions in their colonies. Catholic evangelization was politically motivated and coercive. Protestant churches emerged in the 19th century, followed by evangelicals. Traditional Protestants viewed Latin America as evangelized by Catholics (1910 Edinburgh Conference), but evangelicals saw it as a mission field. Presbyterian, Methodist, Quaker, and Bible society missions had limited success due to anti-Catholicism and foreign liturgies. Pentecostals proved the most expansive evangelical group, with various explanations for their success despite doctrinal similarity to other fundamentalists (Methodists, Baptists, Presbyterians). Timothy J. Steigenga, a political scientist, analyzed three explanations.

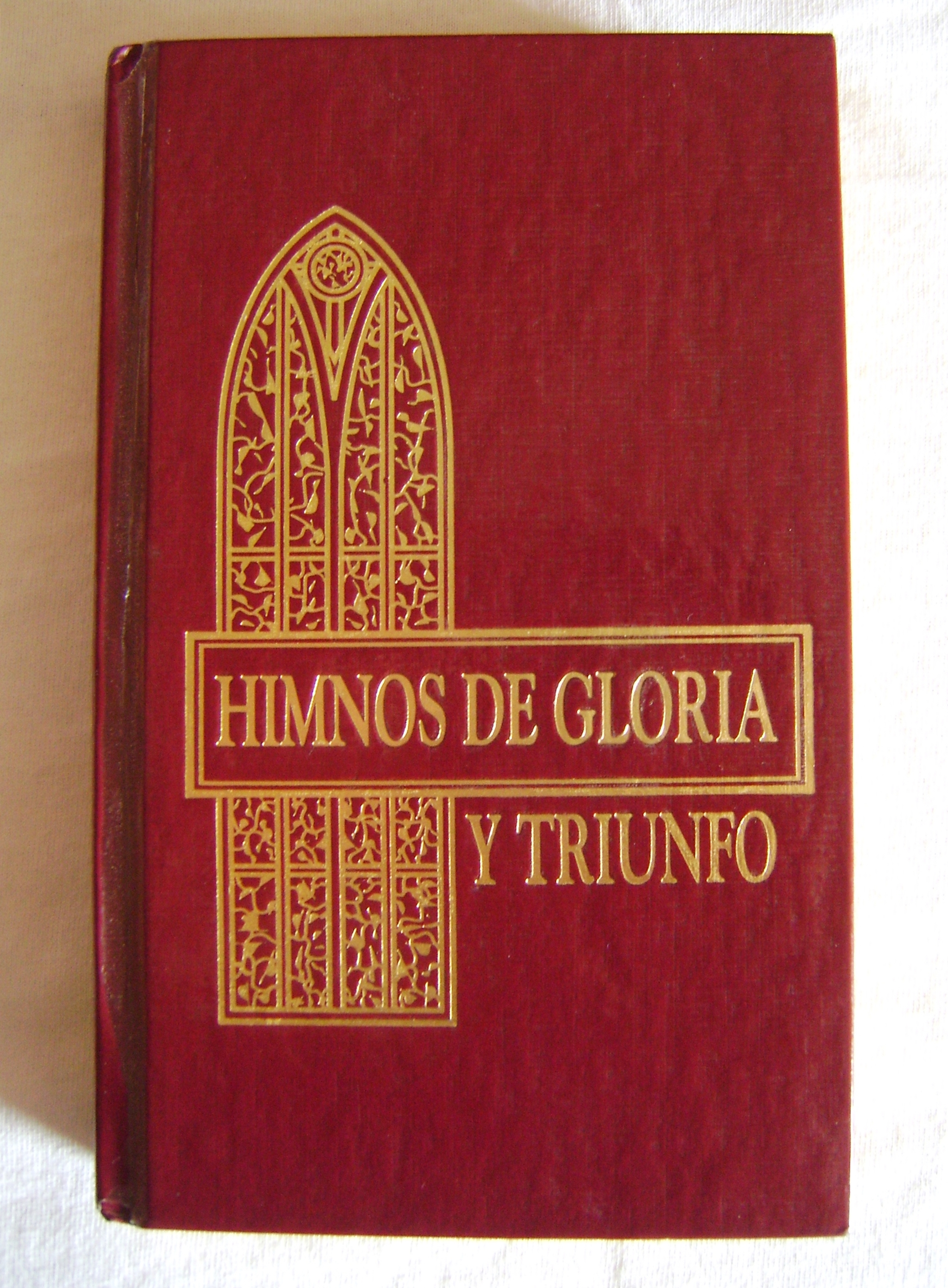
Hymnal used by Spanish-speaking denominations

Among the reasons cited is the support of the United States for Protestant churches, especially due to pressure concerning the constitutional guarantee of religious freedom. President Theodore Roosevelt believed that Latin America would remain difficult to win over to American economic interests as long as it remained Catholic. In 1984, Nueva Vida published an article claiming that the 1969 Rockefeller Report stated that the Catholic Church was no longer a guarantor of social stability on the continent and had therefore ceased to be a trustworthy ally of the United States. The report was said to call on the US government to support the development of Protestantism. However, no such statement exists in the Rockefeller Report, although this argument is still often cited. It was used by Guerriero and Impagliazzo in their book on the recent history of the church. In 1986, a Vatican report was written on sects and new religious movements. The report included a remark that sects serve external economic and political interests. In the 1980s, leftist circles and groups associated with the Catholic Church liked to explain the rise of Evangelicalism as the result of American missionary activity, and Protestantism as the outcome of the cultural expansion of the United States. In 2001, Timothy J. Steigenga noted that in Costa Rica and Guatemala, 60 percent of believers were introduced to their new religion by family members, and only 3 percent of Pentecostals joined due to radio or television influence. Latin American Protestant churches are led by local leaders. Costa Rica is a country with high activity of American missionaries, and yet the results of their efforts are modest.

Another explanation links conversion to social advancement, citing Max Weber. However, Pentecostals often remain among the lowest social strata. Steigenga's adaptive model views conversion as a survival strategy during change, though converts cited the religion's answers to daily life questions. Other factors include promises of freedom from addiction, material aid, divine healing, and prosperity gospel.

One of the factors that led to the shift toward Pentecostalism was liberation theology. Catholic priests began to speak mainly about politics instead of the Gospel. Rather than addressing spiritual issues, they preached that social problems were paramount and that alienation was to blame for everything. As a result, many Catholics turned to Pentecostals, who "did not talk to them about Fidel Castro and the struggle against oppressors, but about Jesus Christ and the struggle against sin".

Emilio Willems and Christian Lalive d'Epinay, the first sociologists to study Pentecostalism, believed that the reason for the growth of this religious movement was its ability to meet human needs. In the second half of the 20th century, Latin American society underwent profound social transformations, and many people were forced to change the way of life they had been accustomed to. These individuals were seeking a way to renew their identity. Generally, they came from the poorest social classes. Its adaptability to Third World contexts, or inculturation, fosters emotional experiences like peace, joy, and ecstasy.

The missionary dynamism of Pentecostalism stems, among other things, from a spirit of rivalry, competition, and expansionist strategy, which characterize the charismatic leaders of communities – leaders for whom success is measured by the number of members, the growth of the congregation, the size of the church, or the amount of tithe collected. The popularity of Pentecostalism also has psychological roots, arising from the uncertainties of contemporary times. The uncontrolled expression of emotions during services serves as a form of collective therapy, through which catharsis and release from anxieties occur.

The Catholic Church had grown accustomed to a religious monopoly, which led to a situation in which it was unable to meet the challenge posed by other denominations. In addition, the Catholic Church has always suffered from a shortage of priestly and monastic vocations. In the Amazon region, there were situations where a single priest had to serve a parish of over 70,000 faithful. Due to the shortage of priests, it was not always possible to administer the sacraments, and many Sunday services were held without a priest. Protestant communities explain the departure of the faithful from the Catholic Church as a consequence of its hierarchical structure and authoritarian message, which no longer fit with contemporary realities, as well as its disregard for other religious communities.

Pentecostals claim to restore the Gospel's original meaning, likening their movement to a biblical "latter rain".

== Catholic Church responses ==
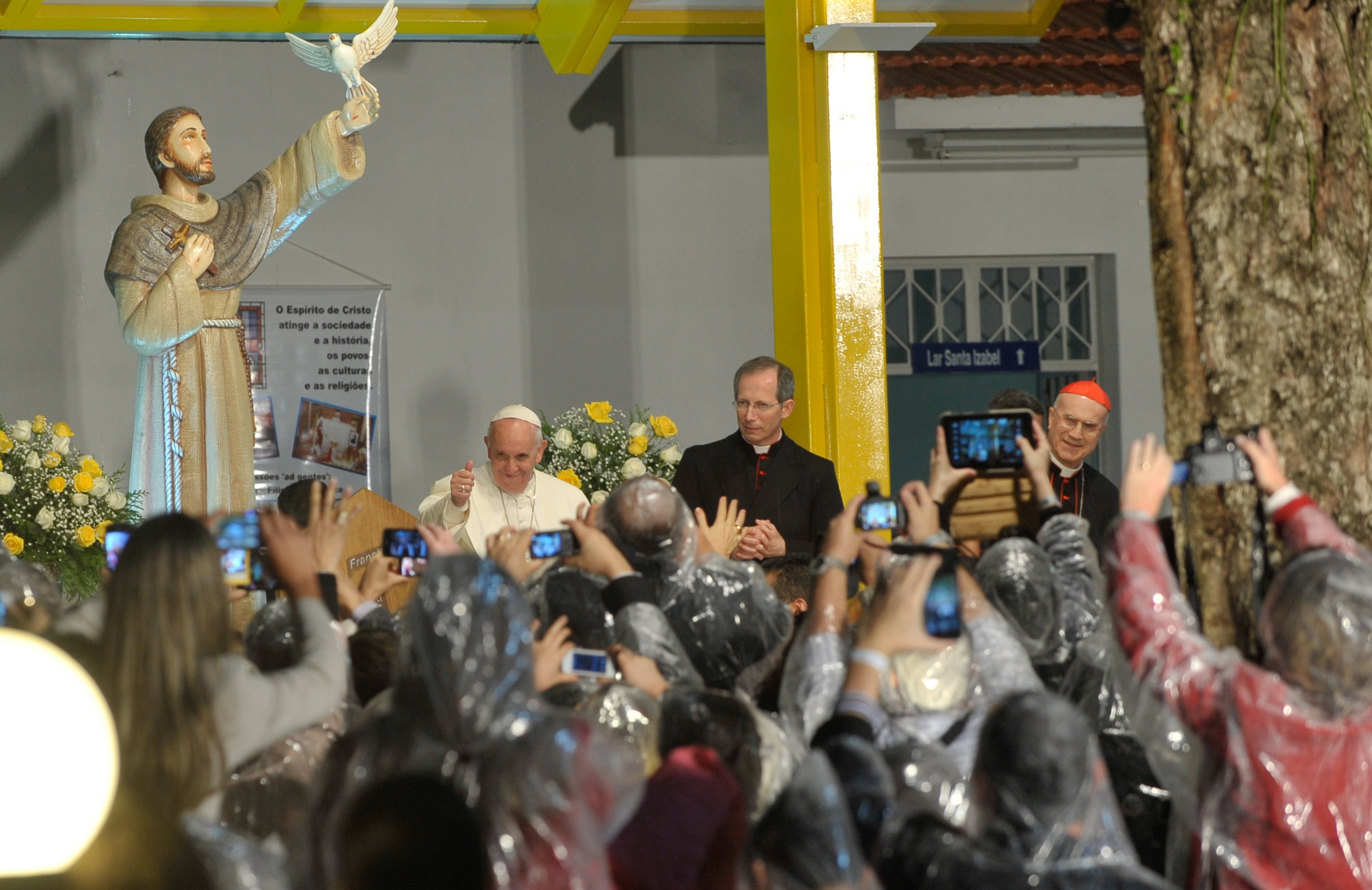
Pope Francis' visit to Brazil

The Latin American Catholic Church often diverged from the Vatican. In the late 20th century, many clergy supported liberation theology, criticized by the Vatican. In Argentina and El Salvador, the church backed military juntas responsible for thousands of deaths, without self-reform. Nicaraguan priests joined the Sandinista government, and in Haiti and Paraguay, priests became presidents, against Vatican wishes.

The Vatican saw Latin America as the church's future, dubbed the "continent of hope" by Paul VI and John Paul II. John Paul II's first pilgrimage on 25 January 1979 targeted Central America for evangelization. Mass conversions to Protestantism, especially Pentecostalism, shifted it to a "continent of concern". The church's monopoly was questionable by John Paul II's election. In 1996 in Guatemala, he called evangelical Protestants sectarians and "ravenous wolves".

Vocations rose from 8,520 in 1978 to 22,241 in 2003 under John Paul II.

Latin American Pentecostals resist ecumenical dialogue with Catholics, rejecting John Paul II's proposals. Tensions sometimes turned violent, as on 15 October 1995 when a Universal Church pastor kicked a Our Lady of Aparecida statue on television, prompting vandalism of Universal Church temples.

A Vatican congress from 9 to 12 December 2012, "Ecclesia in America", addressed the church's status in the Americas. Francis is the first pope from Latin America. His first apostolic journey took place in Brazil. The Pope criticised the Brazilian Church for losing members. He reproached it for its "intellectual style", which is not understood by the faithful. He asked the Brazilian bishops to reflect on "why hundreds of thousands of Catholics have joined Pentecostal congregations".

== Evaluations and criticism ==
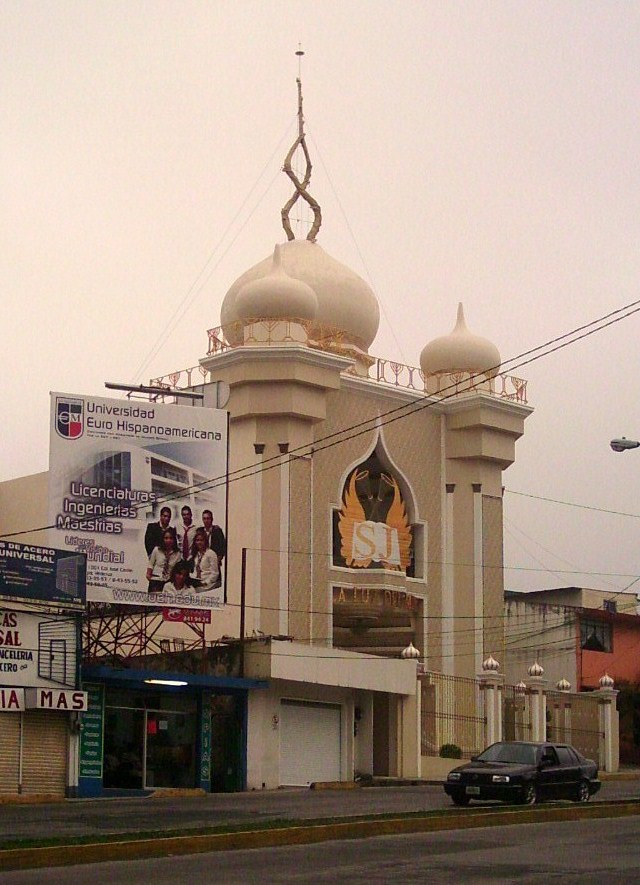
La Luz del Mundo, Xalapa, Veracruz

In the early 1980s, Archbishop Antonio Quarracino stated that free churches had attacked "like a phalanx on our societies, with fanaticism typical of every sect, with dollars and abundant financial resources, with proselytism of the worst kind, which we thought had already lost its reason for existence".

In the 1980s, critics began to accuse Pentecostals of making false promises to new believers, claiming they could solve their problems. Jean-Pierre Bastián argued in 1986 that Protestantism had lost its historical mission in Latin America because it led to alienation and false consciousness. Instead of secularization and the removal of illusions, as happened in Europe, Latin American society received a reactionary Pentecostalism. In 1997, he stated that despite its internal fragmentation, Pentecostalism was an expression of a set of social dynamics, among which, in the case of charismatic Pentecostals, the central goal was the pursuit of domination. The best examples of this were the Universal Church of Brazil and the International Charismatic Mission in Colombia. He also stated that, unlike Protestantism, Pentecostalism is a religion of oral tradition. Critics accused Pentecostalism of isolating itself from society.

André Corten, in 1995, expressed the view that Pentecostalism has a syncretic character, with roots in African cults, as evidenced by Brazilian Pentecostalism, which draws from Afro-Brazilian practices and popular Catholicism. Doctrine plays a small role because Pentecostalism relies more on religious experience than on doctrine. Pentecostalism is not only a religion of the poor, but also the language of the poor. Corten believes that Pentecostal "liberation" is better received in Latin America than liberation theology. Liberation theology used expert language, while Pentecostalism speaks the simple language of the masses. Corten accused Pentecostals of opportunism, supporting dictators like Efraín Ríos Montt, Alberto Fujimori, and Augusto Pinochet.

David Martin on 15 June 1990 likened Pentecostalism's role to Methodism in the Anglo-Saxon world. On 10 March 2002, he saw a shift from Latin-European Catholicism to Anglo-Saxon Protestantism.

Sociologist Brian Wilson classified Pentecostalism as a conversionist sect, prioritizing evangelization.

Catholic liberation theology rarely addressed Pentecostalism, often labeling it fundamentalist sects uninterested in fighting poverty. F.C. Rolim on 20 April 1991 argued Brazilian Pentecostalism's apolitical stance supported social inequality. C. Boff praised Pentecostal ethics and political potential.

Brazilian Jesuit Miguel Pastorino argued Pentecostals are not a sect, though some groups like "God is Love" and the Universal Church exhibit sectarian traits, commending their inculturation.

Protestant liberation theologians criticized Pentecostalism's eschatology for ignoring social history, accusing it of offering empty promises to desperate believers.

== Bibliography ==
- Beltrán Cely, William Mauricio (2010). "La expansión pentecostal en Colombia. Una revisión del estado del arte" [Pentecostal Expansion in Colombia: A Review of the State of the Art]. El pentecostalismo en Colombia. Prácticas religiosas, liderazgo y participación política [Pentecostalism in Colombia: Religious Practices, Leadership, and Political Participation] (PDF) (in Spanish). Bogotá: Universidad Nacional de Colombia. ISBN 978-958-8063-72-0. Archived from the original (PDF) on 2014-05-15.
- Guerriero, Elio; Impagliazzo, Marco (2008). Najnowsza historia Kościoła: katolicy i kościoły chrześcijańskie w czasie pontyfikatu Jana Pawła II (1978–2005) [Recent History of the Church: Catholics and Christian Churches During the Pontificate of John Paul II (1978–2005)] (in Polish). Translated by Partyka, Jacek. Wydawnictwo M. ISBN 978-83-60725-67-2.
- O’Neil, Sean S. (2003). Thinking in the Spirit: The Emergence of Latin American Pentecostal Scholars and Their Pneumatology of Social Concern. Ohio: Ohio University. Archived from the original on 2023-11-07.
- Sarnacki, Andrzej (2013). "Religia w koncepcji udanego życia: ruchy pentekostalne w Ameryce Łacińskiej" [Religion in the Concept of a Successful Life: Pentecostal Movements in Latin America]. Anthropos? (in Polish). 20/21.
- Steigenga, Timothy J. (2001). The Politics of the Spirit: The Political Implications of Pentecostalized Religion in Costa Rica and Guatemala. Lanham, MD: Lexington Books.
- Westmeier, Karl-Wilhelm (1999). Protestant Pentecostalism in Latin America: A Study in the Dynamics of Missions. Fairleigh Dickinson University Press. ISBN 0-8386-3834-1.
