= João Campos de Araújo =

Brazilian politician

João Campos
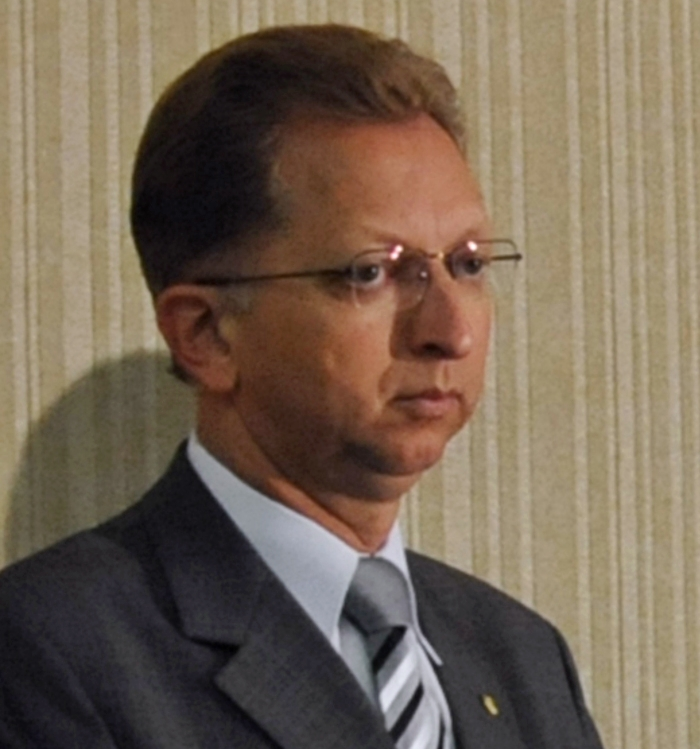

Member of the Chamber of Deputies
- In office 1 February 2003 – 1 February 2023
- Constituency: Goiás

Personal details
- Born: João Campos de Araújo; 28 December 1962 (age 63) Peixe, Tocantins, Brazil
- Party: PODE (since 2023)
- Other political affiliations: PSDB (2001–2016); Republicanos (2016–2023)
- Profession: Police officer

João Campos de Araújo (Portuguese pronunciation: [ʒuˈɐ̃w̃ ˈkɐ̃pus dʒi aɾaˈuʒu]; born 28 December 1962), commonly referred to as João Campos, is a Brazilian politician and pastor. Although born in Tocantins, he has spent his political career representing Goiás, having served as state representative since 2003.

== Personal life ==
João Campos is a pastor of the Assembleias de Deus church. The institutions endorsement of him was key to his election in 2002. However, for the 2018 election the church leadership decided to endorse rival candidate Glaustin da Fokus in the Goiás election. He is married to Ilda Rodrigues Campos and is an alumnus of the Pontifical Catholic University of Goiás.

== Political career ==
João Campos voted in favor of the impeachment against then-president Dilma Rousseff and political reformation. He would later back Rousseff's successor Michel Temer against a similar impeachment motion, and also voted in favor of the Brazil labor reform (2017).

João Campos caused some controversy during the 2010-11 legislative session when he proposed a bill promoting conversion therapy.
