= Glaustin da Fokus =

Brazilian politician (born 1973)

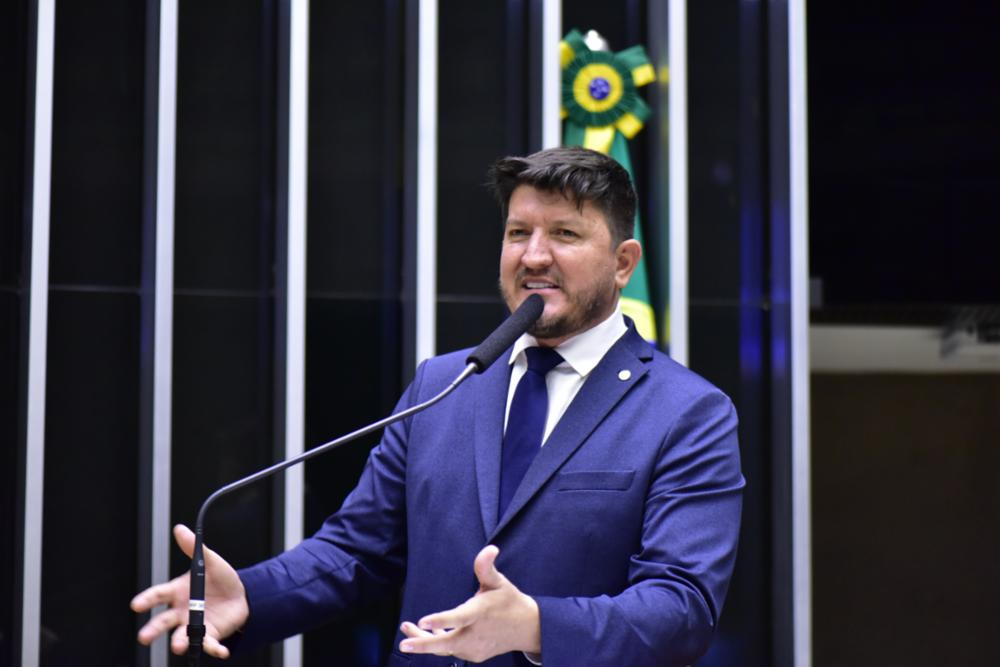

Member of the Chamber of Deputies
- Incumbent
- Assumed office 1 February 2019
- Constituency: Goiás

Personal details
- Born: 22 December 1973 (age 52)
- Party: Podemos (since 2023)

Glauskston Batista Rios, better known as Glaustin da Fokus (born 22 December 1973), is a Brazilian politician serving as a member of the Chamber of Deputies since 2019. He has served as president of Podemos in Goiás since 2024.
