= José Wellington Bezerra da Costa =

Brazilian Pentecostal pastor

- Born: October 14, 1934 (age 91); São Luís do Curu, Brazil
- Spouse: Wanda Freire da Costa
- Children: José Wellington Costa Júnior; Paulo Freire Costa; Marta Freire Costa; Samuel Freire Costa; Joel Freire Costa; Rute Freire Costa
- Ordained: Pentecostal
- Offices held: General Superintendent, Assembleias de Deus
- Website: www.pastorjosewellington.com

José Wellington Bezerra da Costa (born São Luís do Curu, 14 October 1934) is a Brazilian Pentecostal pastor from the Assemblies of God Bethlehem Ministry in Brazil. Since January 1980, he has been the General Superintendent of the Assembleias de Deus (AD) the largest Latin American Pentecostal denomination, which is related to the Assembly of God. He also is a Pastor of the Assembly of God Bethlehem Ministry in São Paulo, Brazil. Today, the Assembly of God Bethlehem Ministry in Brazil exceeds 400,000 member and congregants. He is a member of the world commission of the World Assemblies of God Fellowship.
