= São Luís do Curu =

Municipality in Ceará, Brazil

- Municipality
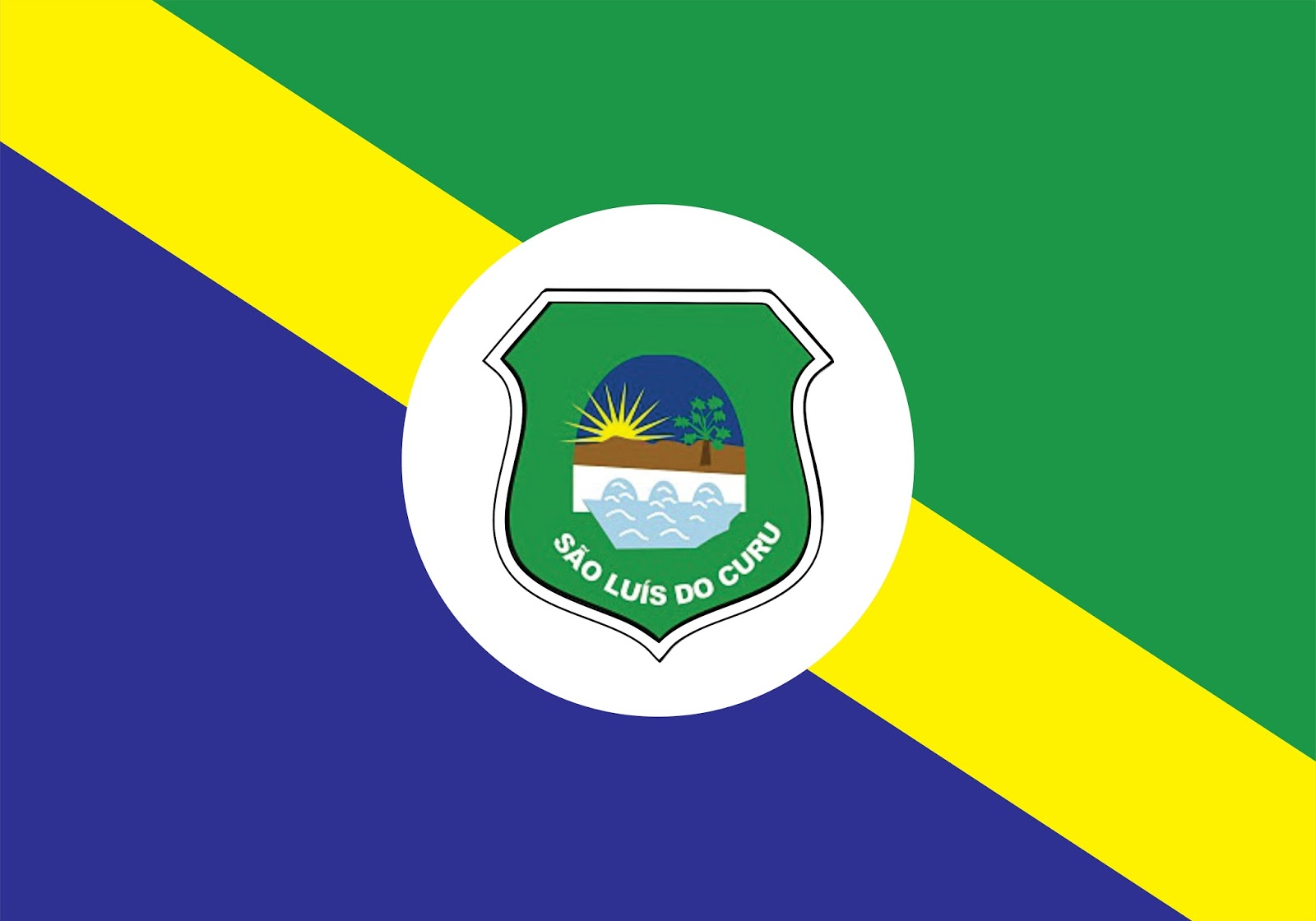
- Flag
- Interactive map of São Luís do Curu
- Coordinates: 3°40′S 39°14′W
- Country: Brazil
- Region: Nordeste
- State: Ceará
- Mesoregion: Noroeste Cearense

Population (2020)
  - Total: 13,044
- Time zone: UTC−3 (BRT)

São Luís do Curu is a municipality in the state of Ceará in the Northeast region of Brazil.

== See also ==
- List of municipalities in Ceará
