= Metro World Child =

Christian organization

Metro World Child (formerly Metro Ministries) is a global faith based non profit organization with its headquarters in New York City.

== History ==
The organization was established in 1980 by Bill Wilson. Metro World Child conceived and pioneered the concept of Sidewalk Urban Outreach. Since 1980, the concept is duplicated across the world by the thousands of people they have trained.

== Programs ==
Each Saturday in NYC there over 1000 children picked up in school buses at their homes. Weekdays, special trucks provide a mobile stage at hundreds of locations.

The Metro staff and trained volunteers visit the families of the children every week at their homes. Metro has also organized child sponsorship. For the children who live too far to go to the Sunday School services, they have wandering trucks that stop in areas of the city and where from they produce Sidewalk Sunday School.

This program has been proven to be an efficient and effective method of reaching large numbers of children and families on a personal level.

The programs reaching weekly over 21,000 children in New York City and an additional 225,000 in the globally in 13 countries.

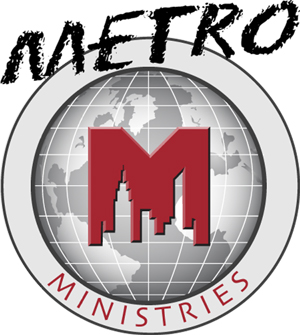
Former logo
