= Bill Wilson (pastor) =

American pastor and founder of Metro World Child (born 1948)

- Born: 1948 (age 77–78); Boston, Massachusetts, U.S.
- Occupation: Pastor
- Spouse: Yenni Wu (married 2026—present)

Bill Wilson (born 1948) is the founder and senior pastor of Metro World Child.

== Biography ==
When Bill Wilson was 12 years, his mother abandoned him on a street corner in Pinellas Park, Florida. He later converted to Christianity and worked at a church as a teenager. After his high school graduation, Wilson was encouraged to attend a seminary. He studied at Southeastern University and obtained a degree in theology.

In 1979, Bill Wilson moved to Bushwick in Brooklyn, New York. In 1980, armed with a bull horn, a station wagon and Yogi Bear costumes, Bill created Metro World Child (formerly Metro Ministries). In 1988, he created the idea of a Sidewalk Sunday School, in which he converted trucks to serve as portable stages from whence his team of ministers could share their message.
