= Gunnar Vingren =

Swedish missionary (1879–1933)

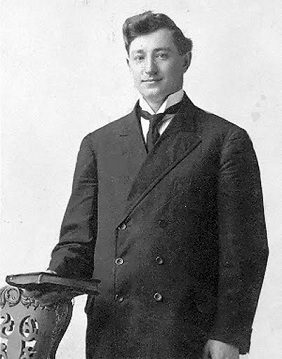
- Born: 8 August 1879; Östra Harg, Östergötland
- Died: 29 June 1933 (aged 53)
- Occupation: Evangelist
- Spouse: Frida Vingen

Gunnar Vingren (1879–1933) was a Swedish Pentecostal missionary evangelist. He served in the early twentieth century in the Amazon and Northeast Brazil. His work led to the creation of the Assembly of God church in Brazil.

== History ==
=== Early life ===
Gunnar Vingren was born in Östra Harg, Sweden in 1879. His father was a gardener and he grew up in a Christian home. After being baptized at the age of 18, he sometimes taught Sunday school at a Baptist Church in Wraka, Sweden. From then on, he sought evangelizing opportunities.

=== United States ===
In 1903, he emigrated to the US, where he became a member of the Swedish Baptist General Conference (Converge) and majored in pastoral studies at Swedish Theological Seminary of Chicago, now known as Bethel Seminary.

In the early 1900s, emphasis on direct personal experience of God and living a life filled with the Holy Spirit was gaining popularity and Penecostal meetings and groups were growing, with 1904-1905 Welsh revival and the Azusa Street Revival, inspiring Christians around the world.

In 1909, Vingren experienced a desire to receive baptized in the Holy Spirit. He taught at some Scandinavian Baptist churches and decided to follow his missionary vocation.

He later went to South Bend, Indiana, where 20 people were baptized in the Holy Spirit and a Penecostal church was established. At a prayer meeting in Indiana, he stated that God had told him that he would carry out missions in Pará, Brazil. At another praying meeting, Daniel Berg was asked to accompany him to Brazil. On 5 November 1910, Vingren and Berg left New York Port and headed to Pará, Brazil.

=== Brazil ===
On 19 November, Vingren and Berg landed in Brazil and settled in Belém. They studied the Portuguese language and preached the Pentecostal doctrine, initially proselytizing among Baptists in Belém and then to people living along the Amazon in northeastern Brazil.

On 18 June 1911, in the home of Celina de Albuquerque, Vingren and Berg founded the first Brazilian Assemblies of God church.

Vingren met a missionary nurse named Frida Maria Strandburg and they married in Belém.

In the 1920s, Vingren moved to the south to extend the missionary activity, convening the General Convention of the Assemblies of God in Brazil, creating publications, and compiling a hymnal. Vingren and his family went south, passing through Rio de Janeiro, Santa Catarina and São Paulo. After another series of trips, he returned to Rio de Janeiro and settled there permanently. As in Pará, the Pentecostal work in Rio de Janeiro grew exponentially.

=== Death ===
Due to health problems, Vingren and his family said their goodbyes to the church in Rio de Janeiro and Brazil on 15 August 1932. He returned to Sweden, where his state worsened and he died in 1933 at the age of 53.

== Frida Vingren ==
Frida was born in 1891. She was part of the Pentecostal Philadelphia Church in Stockholm which sent her to Belém in 1917.

She married Gunnar Vingren in 1917 and they had six children.

Frida worked as part of the Pentecostal Church, visiting and caring for the ill and the elderly and translating hymns from Swedish into Portuguese, as well as sending newsletters back to the churches in Sweden.

When the family moved to Rio, she became the first woman of the religion to run a Sunday Bible school, and also started the newspaper Som Alegre, through which she began to defend the idea of women in the ministry. This caused controversy in the denomination and tensions between the church and the Vingrens.

After Gunnar's death, Frida wished to return to Brazil to carry on her missionary work, but did not have the church's support to do so. She then planned to go to Portugal, but ill-health prevented her travelling.

Frida Maria Strandberg Vingren died at the age of 49 on 30 September 1940, in Sweden, with her daughter by her side.

== See also ==
- Assembleias de Deus
- Assembly of God
- Assembly of God Bethlehem Ministry
- List of Assemblies of God people
