= Margaret Peoples Shirer =

Assemblies of God missionary

Margaret Peoples Shirer (1897 – September 25, 1983) was one of the first American Pentecostal Christian missionaries to West Africa. With little formal education, at she traveled to Burkina Faso in 1919 at the age of 22, with the support of the Assemblies of God. She became the first known person of European origin to learn the language of the Mossi people. She translated portions of the Bible into the Mossi language, Mooré, and used Mossi stories in her preaching. After marrying a fellow missionary, W. Lloyd Shirer, the couple became the first to open an Assemblies of God missions office in Ghana. Shirer learned the Dagbani language in Ghana and translated the biblical books of Matthew, Mark, Acts, Ephesians, 1 Peter into the language. Shirer also served as a missionary for the Assemblies of God in Nigeria. After losing the sponsorship of the Assemblies of God (due to her husband's affair), the couple continued to preach the Pentecostal Christian message in other countries, including Congo and Haiti. After Lloyd Shirer's death in 1972, she moved to Springfield, Missouri, where she recruited others for the mission field.

== Early life ==
Margaret Peoples was born in 1897 and lived in Donegal, Ireland until immigrating to the United States. In 1917 she moved to Philadelphia, Pennsylvania to live with her sister. Influenced by Bell Malseed, a protestant woman from Donegal, Margaret decided to become a missionary at the age of fifteen. However, her education did not extend beyond grammar school. In an attempt to acquire an education, Margaret studied scripture two hours per day as a teenager. In Philadelphia, Margaret became a Pentecostal Christian and felt supported by her church to pursue her ambitions for the mission field. She also worked two jobs and recalled that she wished to demonstrate that she could be a hard worker as a missionary. When she applied to become a missionary of the Assemblies of God in 1919, she received an endorsement from Eudorus N. Bell, the first general superintendent of the denomination.

== Missionary career ==
Margaret Peoples's career as a missionary began as a single woman at the age of twenty two. Her first appointment was to Moshiland, Ouagadougou (now known as Burkina Faso). To get to the region, she traveled through Sierra Leone with three other missionaries—a married couple with the surname Leeper, and a woman, Jenny Farnsworth. The travel was difficult and Margaret caught a fever that lasted for several days. In 1921 she arrived in Mossi Land with another group of missionaries that included another single woman along with two married women and their spouses, Wilbur Taylor and Harry Wright.

Margaret was younger than most missionaries that she met on her first trip to Africa. She had an adventurous personality and was quick to try new things. When offered a choice between a bicycle and a horse for travel, she chose an untrained horse even though she had never ridden one before. Margaret was also eager to learn new languages and customs. While learning the Mossi language, Mooré, Margaret developed an alphabet for the language and translated the Gospel of Mark. She also wrote stories in Mooré and used them to teach Mossi women to read. Margaret Peoples is the first known Western person to be fluent in Mooré.

In 1925, Peoples returned to the United States for a three month break. She was ordained during this break by her pastor in Philadelphia, E.S. Williams. On her way back to Africa she stopped in France for nine months to learn French. When she returned to Africa, she married her husband, W. Lloyd Shirer, and appended his last name after hers. Her son and daughter were born in Africa while she was working as a missionary and were left in the care of local women when she went on preaching tours. Peoples Shirer also home schooled the children during this time. However, by the mid-1930s the children were sent to live with an uncle in the United States.

In 1931, Margaret and her husband became the first Pentecostal missionaries to Ghana. The couple also opened the first Assemblies of God mission station in Ghana in the late 1930s and used it as a base for mission trips in Nigeria. In 1939, a leader of a church in Port Harcourt, Nigeria, Augustus Wogu, affiliated his congregation with the Assemblies of God following the work of the Margaret and her husband. The church in Port Harcourt marked the beginning of the Assemblies of God in Nigeria.

As a missionary, Peoples Shirer participated in the destruction of local "fetish objects" and encouraged her converts to convert others to Pentecostal Christianity. Peoples Shirer, like many Assemblies of God missionaries at the time, considered Catholics to be in need of salvation and confronted and argued with Catholics on the mission field.

While on a furlough in the United States in the mid-1940s, Margaret's husband had an affair. As a result, the couple lost the support of the Assemblies of God for their missions work. Nonetheless, the couple stayed together and returned to Africa in 1947. The couple took jobs with the support of the governments of Ghana and Congo.

In the late 1960s, the couple, still without the support of the Assemblies of God, worked at a Bible college in Haiti. In Haiti, Margaret's husband also worked for a literacy program sponsored by the Haitian government.

Margaret's husband died in 1972 and she returned to the United States. In the States, she continued to preach and hold meetings in Assemblies of God churches located in the Springfield, Missouri area. She also worked to recruit future missionaries.

Margaret Peoples Shirer died of a stroke on September 25, 1983.

== Influence ==
During the early 20th century, the Assemblies of God denomination was less strict regarding gender roles in missions work than were some other denominations. At the time, there were more women than men serving as Assemblies of God missionaries in Africa. Like many missionaries of Pentecostal Christianity, her credentials were established by her calling as a believer more so than by her formal education. Peoples Shirer expanded the Assemblies of God missionary presence in Africa. She helped to open missions in Yendi, Tamad, and Burkina Faso. She also wrote a grammar book and dictionary for the Dagbani language and translated the books of Matthew, Mark, Acts, Ephesians, and 1 Peter.

Peoples Shirer and her husband were helped by local, Mooré preachers in their efforts to spread Pentecostal Christianity in Ghana. From 1931 to 1960, the Assemblies of God church in Ghana grew to include at least one congregation in every large town. Although Peoples Shirer helped to introduce the Assemblies of God to Ghana, the church did not spread rapidly until 1973 when the leadership was transferred to Ghanaians. By 2013, the church included 2,400 congregations and over 500,000 members.
