= Daniel Berg (evangelist) =

Swedish missionary (1884–1963)

- Born: April 19, 1884; Vargön, Sweden
- Died: May 27, 1963 (aged 79)
- Occupation: Evangelist

Daniel Berg was a Swedish Pentecostal evangelist missionary who served in the early twentieth century in the Amazon and Northeast Brazil. Together with Gunnar Vingren, he started the movement that gave rise to the name Assemblies of God in Brazil with 22.5 million members in the country, the largest evangelical church in the country.

== History ==
Daniel Berg was born in Vargön, Sweden. Daniel was the son of Gustav Verner Högberg and Fredrika Högberg. He learned the trade of blacksmith refiner, became converted and was baptized in water in 1899. Berg later immigrated to New England of the United States in 1902 following economic downturn. On a visit to Sweden learned about the Pentecostal movement by a friend and return to the United States (1909) involves the Pentecostal experience. In this year, at a conference in Chicago, he met pastor Gunnar Vingren.

Daniel Berg arrived in Belém, capital of Pará, on November 19, 1910, along with his friend and fellow missionary Gunnar Vingren and started spreading Pentecostal with proselytizing in Bethlehem Baptist Church in Brazil, studied Portuguese, was employed as a boilermaker Company and smelter in Port of Para.

== Personal life ==
Berg married Sara during a visit to Sweden in the 1920s. The couple came to Brazil in 1927 and moved to São Paulo.

== See also ==
- Gunnar Vingren
- Assembleias de Deus
- Assembly of God
- Assembly of God Bethlehem Ministry
