= Assembleias de Deus =

Conglomerate of evangelical churches

Assemblies of God in Brazil
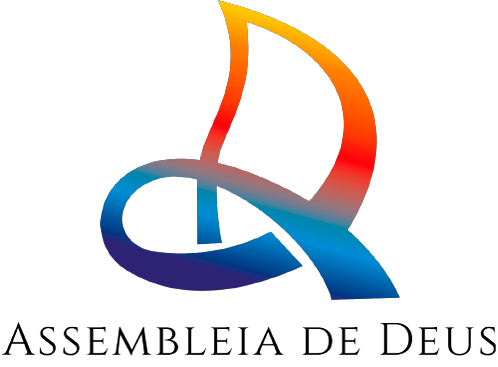
- Classification: Protestant
- Orientation: Pentecostal
- Scripture: Protestant Bible
- Theology: Finished Work Pentecostalism
- Leader: José Wellington Jr. (President of CGADB) Samuel Câmara (President of CADB) Manoel Ferreira (President of CONAMAD)
- Associations: Assembly of God
- Region: Worldwide
- Headquarters: Rio de Janeiro, Brazil
- Founder: Daniel Berg and Gunnar Vingren
- Origin: 1911; Belém, Pará, Brazil
- Absorbed: Free Baptist Church; Independent Presbyterian Church of Brazil (Maranhense, MA and Portas Abertas, CE Congregations)
- Separations: Brazilian Baptist Convention (1911)
- Congregations: 100,000
- Members: 12 million (2013)

The Assembleias de Deus (Portuguese pronunciation: [ɐsẽˈblɛjɐz dʒi ˈdews]) are a Pentecostal church in Brazil founded by Daniel Berg and Gunnar Vingren, who came to Brazil as missionaries from the Swedish Pentecostal movement. The Assembleias de Deus are related to the worldwide Pentecostal movement, and some groups are affiliated with the World Assemblies of God Fellowship.

== History ==
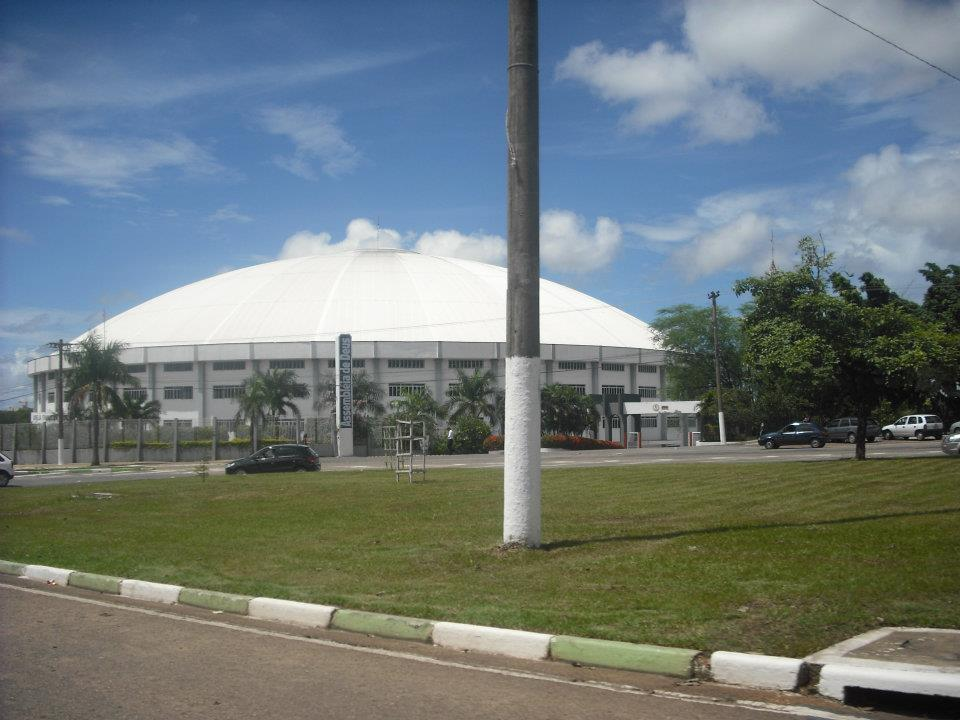
Grande Templo in Cuiabá, Mato Grosso.

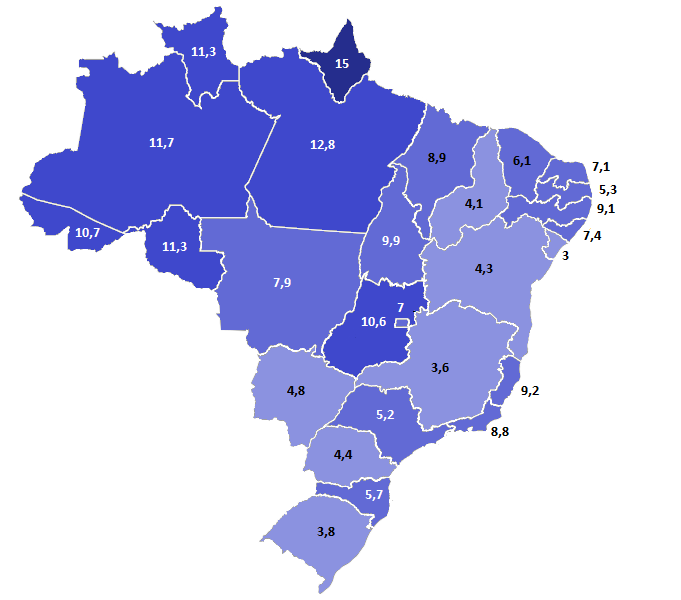
Percentage of the population attending Assembleias de Deus-affiliated churches by state in Brazil

The Assembleias de Deus began when Daniel Berg and Gunnar Vingren, two Swedish Pentecostal missionaries departed to Brazil. They arrived in Belém, Pará, where in 1911 they founded the Missão de Fé Apostólica ('Apostolic Faith Mission'), which later changed its name in 1918 to Assembleia de Deus.

The Pentecostal movement in Brazil had already begun by that time among Italians in São Paulo, by an Italian-American missionary, Louis Francescon, who founded the Christian Congregation of Brazil (CCB) in 1910. While the CCB spread in the South, the Assembleias de Deus reached the Amazon villages and the semi-arid Nordeste before migrants from the North brought the Church to Rio de Janeiro and São Paulo in the late 1920s.

Initially the Assembleia de Deus was closely linked to the Scandinavian Pentecostal movement, led by Lewi Pethrus, who financed and sent missionaries to help Berg and Vingren. The Swedish Pentecostals gave autonomy to the Brazilian Assembleia de Deus in a General Convention in 1932. From that time onward, the American Assemblies of God increased their presence in the Brazilian denomination, mainly in doctrinal and teaching spheres, but the church retained its independence from its American brethren. Walter Hollenweger explains the relationship as follows: "In the mission statistics of the North American Assemblies of God, the Assembleia de Deus figure as their mission church. In contrast, the Brazilian Pentecostals regard themselves as an independent church."

According to a census of the General Convention of the Assemblies of God in Brazil in 2013, it would have 12 million members.

== Denominations ==
Since the 1911 the Assembleias de Deus have suffered several schisms and splits. As a consequence, many Conventions and Ministérios left using the same name, Assembleia de Deus, though they are totally independent organizations. The most significant denominations named Assembleias de Deus are:

- Convenção Geral das Assembleias de Deus no Brasil (CGADB)—(English: General Convention of the Assemblies of God in Brazil) the only authentic and historical convention of the pioneer church in Brazil, headquartered in Belém do Pará; it considers itself the heir of the Swedish mission. The CGADB has nearly twenty thousand ministries. Since 2018, the federal government has recognized the authenticity of the church, the Convention and its legacy in Brazilian history. Some federal members of parliament are members of the Assemblies of God and interact institutionally with public authorities on matters of interest to the denomination.
- National Convention of the Assemblies of God Madureira Ministry (CONAMAD in Portuguese)—founded by pastor Paulo Leivas Macalão. This ministry was founded on November 15, 1958. Madureira was part of CGADB until an extraordinary assembly where the ministers of Madureira withdraw from the convention. By this time Madureira had more ministers under a single leadership. Since the other brothers tried to move Madureira away from a protagonist role in the leadership of the convention, the ministers left to create another convention.

== Foreign work ==
The Assembleias de Deus has always sent missionaries abroad, starting in 1913 when a returning Portuguese immigrant was sent to Portugal. Today, there are Brazilian missionaries in Latin America and Portuguese-speaking Africa. There also are Assembleias de Deus among Brazilian immigrant communities in North America, Japan, and Western Europe, but they do not typically have a relationship with local World Assemblies of God Fellowship-affiliated national denominations.

In the United States there exists Assembleias de Deus, mostly on the east coast; some are affiliated with the Brazilian District of the Assemblies of God, but the majority of the Brazilian churches are either independent or linked to their ministério back in Brazil.

== Organization ==
The Assembleias de Deus have a non-territorial episcopal polity (called ministério) where each ministério is a directed by a mother church under a pastor-president (also called bishop or apostle in various ministérios) with affiliated congregations and preaching points. The mother church receives tithes and manages the funds of the affiliated local churches, as well as assigning pastors to local congregations. Pastoral leadership has a strong influence on the decision-making process, and the members only rubber stamp the ministério's decisions.

As the ministério structure overlaps many territorial boundaries, there usually is not much organizational collaboration among ministérios. Each ministério operates almost entirely independently, and ends up becoming an independent denomination unto itself. Among the major ministérios are the Assembly of God Bethlehem Ministry, which has about 2,200 churches concentrated in the south-central and headquartered in the Belenzinho neighborhood of São Paulo. In 2008, Ministério do Belém was chaired by Pastor José Wellington Bezerra da Costa, who succeeded Pastor Cicero Canuto de Lima, who also chaired the CGADB.

Since the 1980s, for administrative reasons, notably after the death of Pastor Paul Leiva Macalão and his wife, Zelia, a missionary, the Assembleias de Deus has undergone several divisions that gave rise to various conventions and ministries with autonomous administration in various regions of the country. The most significant of the independent ministries are the Ministry of Madureira, whose church has existed since the 1930s, founded by the aforementioned Pastor Paul Leiva Macalão and, in 1958, served as the basis for structuring the national ministry chaired by him until his death in late 1982.

== Doctrine ==
Since it is not a unified movement, there are many variations in doctrine and practice in the Assembleias de Deus in Brazil, but they share beliefs in the Bible as the sole source of doctrine, the vicarious death of Christ, the baptism of adults by immersion in water, Holy Communion with no wine (grape juice is used, instead), an obligation to tithe, the gifts of the Holy Spirit, the premillennial return of Jesus.

== Politics ==
In Brazil, the Assembleias de Deus have an increasing influence on politics, although representing only a minor segment of the population. The Partido Social Cristão (PSC) is considered the political arm of the Assembleias. The PSC is led by Pastor Everaldo Pereira.

Other Brazilian politicians with ties to the Assembleias, such as Benedita da Silva and Marina Silva, do not follow the right-wing course of the PSC. Marina Silva pursues ecological ideas and supports the rights of the indigenous tribes of her country. Silva has been at times criticized by church leadership for her leftist stance on many issues, such as drug reform.

== See also ==
- List of the largest Protestant bodies
- Assembly of God USA
- Assembly of God Bethlehem Ministry
- List of Assemblies of God people
- Mission Friends
- Radical Pietism

== Bibliography ==
- Almeida, Abraão de. História das Assembléias de Deus no Brasil. Rio de Janeiro: CPAD, 1982.
- Berg, David. Enviado por Deus - Memórias de Daniel Berg Rio de Janeiro: CPAD,
- Conde, Emílio. História das Assembléias de Deus no Brasil. Rio de Janeiro: CPAD, 2000.
- Freston, Paul. "Breve Historia do pentecostalismo brasileiro". Antoniazzi, A. (org.). Nem anjos nem demônios interpretações sociológicas do pentecostalismo. Petrópolis: Vozes, 1994.
- Vingren, Ivar. O Diário do Pioneiro.Rio de Janeiro: CPAD,
- Vingren, Ivar, Nyberg Gunilla, Alvarsson Jan-Åke, Johannesson Jan-Endy. Det började i Pará: svensk pingstmission i Brasilien. Estocolmo: Missionsinstitutet-PMU, 1994.
