= The Cross and the Switchblade (film) =

1970 film directed by Don Murray

- Theatrical release poster
- Directed by: Don Murray
- Screenplay by: Don Murray; James Bonnet
- Based on: The Cross and the Switchblade by David Wilkerson with John and Elizabeth Sherrill
- Produced by: Ken Curtis; Tom Harris; Dick Ross
- Starring: Pat Boone; Erik Estrada; Jacqueline Giroux; Jo-Ann Robinson; Dino de Filippi
- Cinematography: Julian C. Townsend
- Edited by: Angelo Ross
- Music by: Ralph Carmichael
- Production companies: QED Productions; Dick Ross and Associates
- Distributed by: Gateway Films (U.S.); 20th Century Fox (UK)
- Release date: June 17, 1970 (U.S.)
- Running time: 106 minutes
- Country: United States
- Language: English

The Cross and the Switchblade is a 1970 American crime film directed by Don Murray. It stars Pat Boone as David Wilkerson, a Christian evangelist, and Erik Estrada as Nicky Cruz, a teen gang member whose life was transformed by Wilkerson's ministry. The film was based on a non-fiction book of the same name, The Cross and the Switchblade.

== Summary ==
In 1958, Pentecostal pastor David Wilkerson's of Assemblies of God is touched by an article in Life Magazine about seven teenagers who are members of a criminal gang. Alone and with little money, he will go to Brooklyn, sometimes at the risk of his life, to talk about Jesus with members of street gang. A meeting will particularly mark him, that of Nicky Cruz, a member of a street gang, the "Mau Maus".

== Plot ==
The film is based on the true story of David Wilkerson, a small-town preacher who gets caught in the shadows of a crime-ridden neighborhood in New York City. Guided by the streetwise Little Bo, David quickly learns about the neighborhood and how to approach the cynical juveniles. He encounters the Mau Maus, a gang led by president Israel and his "warlord," Nicky Cruz, and David brings a message of hope to the angry youths. David came to New York City from a central Pennsylvania small town with little money, and is put up in a small street chapel owned by Pastor Hector Gomez with a loving family who supports David in his work and offers to help with food and shelter. Cruz at first dismisses Wilkerson as a joke, then as a conspiracy to break up the Mau Maus, serving to only intensify his desire to be rid of him.

Nicky's ex-girlfriend, Rosa, asks Nicky to give her some money for her heroin addiction, and he offers to buy her all the junk she wants if she gets rid of Wilkerson. She confronts him at the Hector's church, where Hector's wife, Graciela, convinces Rosa to stay with them, while they stand vigil as she goes through difficult withdrawals. After Rosa is sober, she tries to convince Nicky that David comes to them out of love, but Nicky becomes more and more frustrated. When David tries an attempt to reach out to all gang members in the area through a revival, the sheriff convinces the NYPD not to survey their neighborhood in order to have the gangs think they are being left alone. Nicky agrees with Big Cat, the leader of the rival Bishops, that they should rumble at the revival since no one would expect that. However, during David's sermon, his message that no one can be labeled and Christ's death on the Cross reaches Nicky, and he stops the gangs from fighting. The film concludes by saying that in the question of the Cross and the Switchblade, the Cross proved stronger.

Nicky Cruz would go on to become an ordained minister, preaching the Gospel due to the initial efforts of David Wilkerson. In the end, they start a center called Teen Challenge to support teens.

== Cast ==
Actor	Role
Pat Boone	David Wilkerson
Erik Estrada	Nicky Cruz
Jacqueline Giroux	Rosa
Dino DeFilippi	Israel
Alex Colon	Mingo
Jo-Ann Robinson	Little Bo
Gil Frazier	Big Cat

== Production ==
By 1968 Wilkerson's book had sold more than four million copies. By 1975 that figure would be over six million.

Pat Boone read the book after seeing it at an airport newsstand on the way to Mexico City. He was immediately taken with it, calling it "a modern day sequel to the Acts of the Apostles in the New Testament." He and an associate, Clint Davidson, took out an option on the book but were unable to raise finance. Boone said "the uniform response was that 'religion is poison at the box office'."

However plans started to take shape when Rick Ross and Associates became involved. Ross had spent 15 years making films for Billy Graham's organisation. The American Baptist Convention helped distribute the film. In June 1969 Don Murray was working on a screenplay.

Filming took place in Harlem in October 1969. "I've been trying to get this story filmed for five years," said Boone. "Working in Harlem has been wonderful – everyone, including the police, has been very cooperative. Maybe they sense this isn't a religious or a 'church' drama."

It was the first credit for Erik Estrada.

It was Pat Boone's last lead in a feature for over twenty years.

== Reception ==
The film received positive reviews from Christians and general moviegoers alike. Pat Boone regards the film as one of his favourites. "I took a huge gamble with that film," he says. "Financially it didn't pay off because I did it for next to nothing – I virtually did it as a charity but I don't regret it at all. Within its limitations it was a very well made film."

Kevin Thomas of the Los Angeles Times said the film was "hard to take" adding that Boone was "unconvincing" as Wilkerson. "Dressed and groomed like a movie star throughout [he] is the biggest obstacle of all to the suspension of disbelief." The New York Times' Howard Thompson wrote, "I liked it... the script... has a pungent, savy edge and some amusing dialogue... the color photography is excellent... three of the youngsters can really act."

=== Box office ===
The film was a box office success aired in 30 languages in 150 countries.

A comic book version of the film was also issued.

== Notes ==
- Boone, Pat (1972). A New life. S John Bacon.
