= Mau Maus =

Puerto Rican gang that operated in Brooklyn, New York, US

- Founding location: New York City, New York, United States
- Years active: 1950–1965
- Territory: United States, New York City Area
- Ethnicity: Puerto Rican
- Criminal activities: Drug trafficking, arms trafficking, assassination, bribery, kidnapping, extortion, money laundering, murder, racketeering.
- Rivals: Bishops; Apaches other gangs

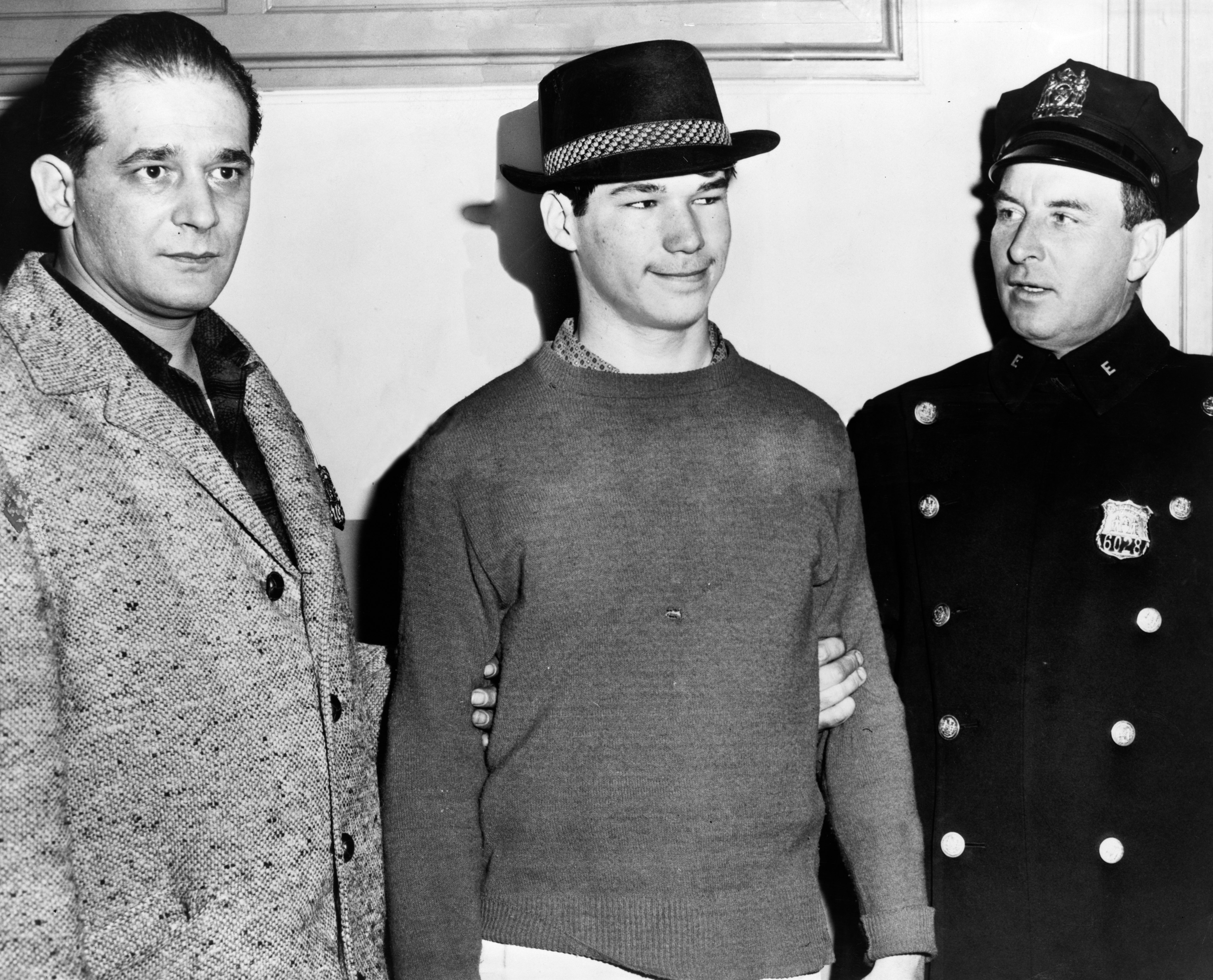
Carl Cintron photographed after his arrest, 1959

Mau Maus was the name of a 1950s street gang in New York City. The book and the adapted film The Cross and the Switchblade and biography Run Baby Run document the life of its most famous leader Nicky Cruz. Their name was derived from the Mau Mau Uprising in Kenya.

Nicky Cruz wrote a book about his experiences called Run Baby Run. Israel Narvaez committed his life to God and wrote a book called Second Chance: The Israel Narvaez Story. David Wilkerson wrote a biography The Cross and the Switchblade and a film of the same name was released.

== History ==
The Mau Maus were a Brooklyn Puerto Rican gang operating from 1957 to around 1962. Some members of a street gang called the Apaches broke away and created the Mau Maus, according to Israel Narvaez, one of the gang's founders. The Apaches had succumbed to heroin while Narvaez and others were more interested in fighting and maintaining territory. They also asked permission from a rival gang called the Chaplains to start a Puerto Rican gang in the area. Eventually the gang was called Mau Mau Chaplains.

Research published in 2018 established that the gang was formed in 1957 by Puerto Rican youths who lived in the Fort Greene Housing Project in Brooklyn, New York. The youths began by approaching the dominant local gang, the Chaplains, to discuss the idea of a new gang. They were supported by Earl Tooley, a leading Chaplain, and the new gang was initially called the Mau Mau Chaplains before becoming simply the Mau Maus. The first leaders were Juan Seda as president, Israel Narvaez as Vice-President and Carlos Reyes as Warlord. The name Mau Maus was chosen after the members watched the movie Something Of Value (released in May 1957 in the United States) about the Mau Mau uprising in East Africa.

Around January 1958 a member of the rival Bishop gang and a candy store owner were stabbed to death by some of the Mau Mau gang, supposedly in retaliation for the Bishops' killing of Mannie Durango, a member of the Mau Maus. One of its best known members was Nicky Cruz, who was president, Vice President, and Warlord at different points during his tenure. Cruz said he stabbed 16 people while a member.

Cruz and his best friend Israel Narvaez became born-again Christians in July 1958, after hearing David Wilkerson preach. However, Narvaez became disillusioned with Christianity and eventually rejoined the Mau Maus. He became their leader again and on February 23, 1959, Narvaez, along with Carl Cintron, Carlos Reyes, and Melvin Torres, shot and killed Anthony Lavonchino, a member of the Sand Street Angels, one of the Mau Maus' enemies. Lavonchino had apparently beaten Tico, a Mau Mau, for walking with his sister. Narvaez later returned to his Christian faith as chronicled in his autobiography, Second Chance.

Salvador Agrón, a member of the Mau Maus, later led another gang called the Vampires, who were responsible for a well-known New York tragedy when on the evening of August 29, 1959, they killed two innocent teen bystanders, mistaking them for rival gang members. The murders became known as the Capeman Murders after the costume worn by Agrón. Paul Simon's Broadway musical The Capeman was based upon the life of Agrón.
