= Carter Conlon =

Canadian-born American pastor and author

Carter Conlon (born 1953) is a Canadian-born American pastor and author. He is best known as the former senior pastor of Times Square Church in New York City.

== Biography ==
Conlon was born and raised in Noranda, Quebec. He graduated from Carleton University in Ottawa, Ontario, where he received a bachelor's degree in law and sociology. In 1987, he left his 12-year career as a police officer to enter full-time ministry. He founded a church, a Christian school, and a food bank in Riceville, Canada. He owned and operated a sheep farm as well. During those years, he also traveled throughout the country, speaking at various churches from Prince Edward Island to Alberta, to the Inuit in the Arctic.

In 1994, he joined the pastoral staff of Times Square Church at the invitation of founding pastor David Wilkerson. He was appointed to the office of senior pastor in 2001. Conlon announced in February 2020 that he would be stepping down as senior pastor of Times Square Church in May of the same year, passing the leadership to Tim Dilena, in order to focus on his radio ministry, speaking, and writing books.

Conlon and his wife, Teresa, have three children and eight grandchildren.

== Ministry ==
=== Times Square Church ===
Located at 237 West 51st in Manhattan, Times Square Church is an interdenominational church with more than 10,000 people in attendance, representing more than 100 different nationalities. Their pastors believe that God has ordained the church to be a testimony of God's love and mercy to New York City and beyond. A major emphasis at Times Square Church is giving aid to the poor, the hungry, the destitute and the addicted.

=== Prayer in the Square ===
In 2006, Conlon called together the churches of New York City to congregate for one hour of prayer in Times Square. As a result, Prayer in the Square was birthed and Christians from all denominations assembled on Broadway. The prayer gathering grew from 50,000 in 2009 to 80,000 live and 17.1 million online in 2021. Conlon and the Times Square Church choir led this event, which was attended by Mayor Michael Bloomberg, who declared that Sunday as Prayer in the Square Day.

=== For Pastors Only ===
In 2010, Conlon created "For Pastors Only" in response to multiple requests he received from ministers seeking spiritual fathering. Now withdrawn, this online resource aired bi-weekly devotionals recorded by Conlon and an advisory team, and was accessed by more than 5,000 pastors worldwide.

=== Radio Syndication ===
Conlon's 1-minute daily devotionals, It's Time to Pray, are broadcast on over 300 Christian radio stations nationwide 5 days per week, summoning the nation to prayer, and are featured on 1010 WINS, the nation's most listened to all-news station.

=== ChildCry ===
In 2004, Conlon traveled with a team of more than 200 people from Times Square Church to Zambia to hold evangelistic and humanitarian outreaches. After witnessing the plight of children living on the streets there, he began to pray about ways to help. This led to the establishment of ChildCry in 2005, a ministry of Times Square Church which currently provides more than 4,000 meals a day for children in over 22 countries.

=== Feed New York ===
In 2012, Conlon initiated "Feed New York", where Times Square Church began to underwrite a number of churches in New York City with $1,000 worth of food every month. The goal was to provide up to 100 churches with a way to offer food, prayer, and hope to those in need in their neighborhoods. Although it began as a one-year initiative, Feed New York continues to support over 10,000 New Yorkers every month through food assistance programs within the five boroughs.

=== Worldwide Prayer Meeting ===
In 2015, Conlon launched the World Wide Prayer meeting at Times Square Church. Every Tuesday night thousands of Christians gather to pray at Times Square Church, either attending in person or participating through live streaming. This service welcomes interactive involvement. Individuals send requests for prayer via the Internet, which are often immediately prayed over during the meeting. Churches and individuals in 199 countries and territories combine their prayers with that of Times Square Church's congregation every week. Since its inception, the World Wide Prayer meeting has received over 200,000 prayer requests and witnessed innumerable answers to prayer.

=== Conferences ===
Conlon has spoken regularly at World Challenge's Renewing Your Passion for Christ conferences, at Conference Paris For Christ, and for the Summer Fire Conference in County Cork, Ireland. Conlon has also ministered at the Family Research Council's Watchmen on the Wall.

== Published works ==
=== Books ===
- The 180 Degree Christian: Serving Jesus in a Culture of Excess, Bethany House Publishers, 2011. ISBN 0830760954
- Fear Not: Living Courageously in Uncertain Times, Bethany House Publishers, 2012. ISBN 978-0830765614
- Unshakable: Trusting God When All Else Fails, Bethany House Publishers, 2014. ISBN 978-0764214462
- It's Time to Pray: God's Power Changes Everything, Charisma House, 2018. ISBN 978-1629995786

=== Children’s books ===
- Petey Yikes, Petey, Rock & Roo Children's Publications, 2006.
- Clunky of Maryborough, Petey, Rock & Roo Children's Publications, 2008. ISBN 0-9789642-1-7
- Katie and the Dogs are Gone, Petey, Rock & Roo Children's Publications, 2009. ISBN 0-9789642-2-5
- Every Good House Needs a Mouse, Petey, Rock & Roo Children's Publications, 2010. ISBN 0-9789642-3-3
- Muddy Dogs & New White Chairs, Petey, Rock & Roo Children's Publications, 2014. ISBN 978-0-9881948-2-3

=== CDs ===
- Quiet Times, 2002
- Where Christmas Never Ends, 2005
- Day by Day, 2007
