= Leonard Ravenhill =

English evangelist

Evangelist Leonard Ravenhill
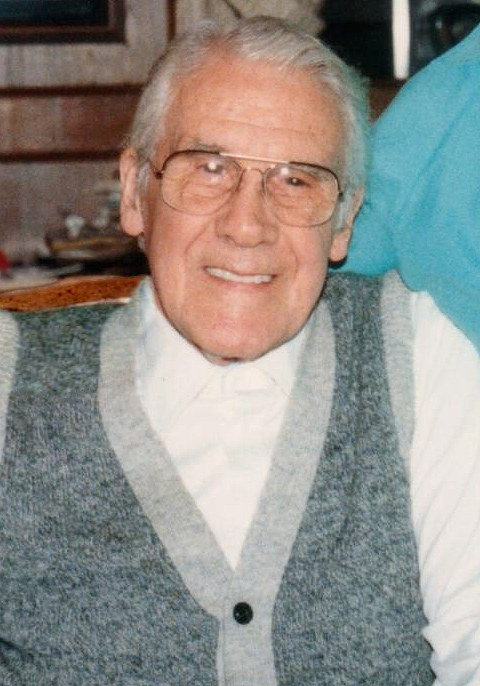
- Ravenhill in 1988
- Born: 18 June 1907; Leeds, England
- Died: 27 November 1994 (aged 87); Garden Valley, Texas, US
- Known for: Why Revival Tarries
- Spouse: Martha (m. 1939)
- Children: 3

Leonard Ravenhill (18 June 1907 – 27 November 1994) was a British Christian evangelist and author who focused on the subjects of prayer and revival. He is best known for challenging western evangelicalism (through his books and sermons) to compare itself to the early Christian Church as chronicled in the Book of Acts. His most notable book is Why Revival Tarries which has sold over a million copies worldwide.

== Biography ==
Leonard Ravenhill was born in Leeds in 1907. He was educated at Cliff College in England and sat under the ministry of Samuel Chadwick. He was a student of church history, with a particular interest in Christian revival. His evangelistic meetings during the Second World War drew large crowds. Many converts devoted themselves to Christian ministry and foreign missions.

In 1939, he married an Irish nurse, Martha (1912-2001). The Ravenhills had three sons.

In 1950, Ravenhill and his family moved from Great Britain to the United States. In the 1960s they travelled within the United States, holding tent revivals and evangelistic meetings.

In 1978, Ravenhill moved to Garden Valley, Texas, a short distance from Last Days Ministries Ranch. He regularly taught classes at LDM and was a mentor to the late Keith Green. He also spent some time teaching at Bethany College of Missions in Minnesota and some time in Seguin, Texas.

Among others influenced by Ravenhill were Keith Green, Charles Stanley, Paul Washer, and David Wilkerson.

He was a close friend of pastor and writer A.W. Tozer as well as singer Keith Green.

Through his teaching and books, Ravenhill addressed the disparities he perceived between the New Testament Church and the Church in his time and called for adherence to the principles of biblical revival.

Tozer said of Ravenhill:

"To such men as this, the church owes a debt too heavy to pay. The curious thing is that she seldom tries to pay him while he lives. Rather, the next generation builds his sepulchre and writes his biography – as if instinctively and awkwardly to discharge an obligation the previous generation to a large extent ignored."

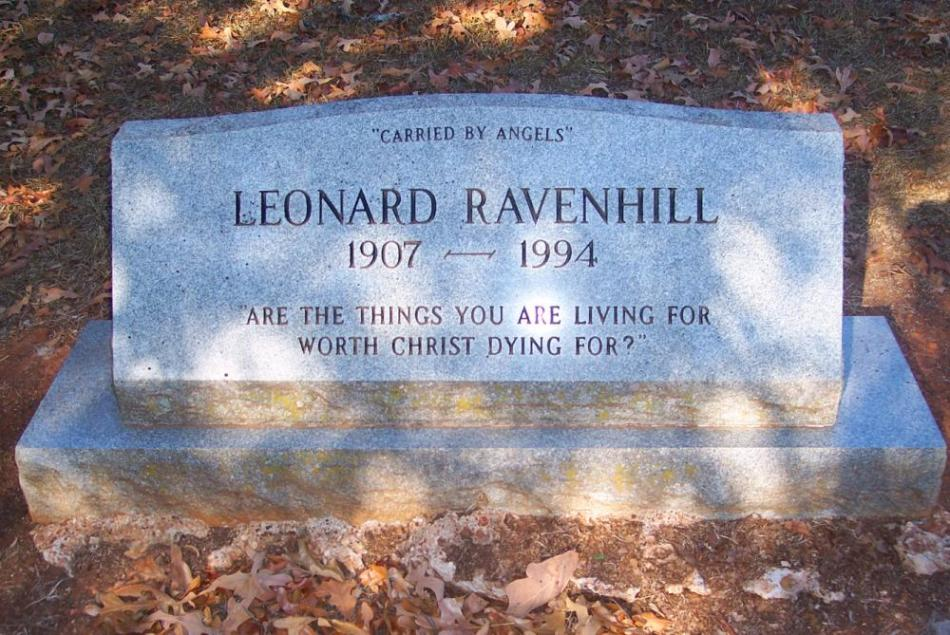
Gravesite at Garden Valley Cemetery in Garden Valley, Texas

Ravenhill died at his home in Garden Valley on 27 November 1994. He was interred near the grave of Contemporary Christian music artist Keith Green.

In 2011 Free Grace Press published a full biography of Leonard Ravenhill written by Mack Tomlinson titled, In Light of Eternity.

== Works ==
- Ravenhill, Leonard (n.d.). John Wesley: Portrait of a Revival Preacher. Leonard Ravenhill.
- Ravenhill, Leonard (n.d.). We wrestle not!. Dixon, MO: Rare Christian Books.
- Ravenhill, Leonard (n.d.). Final message to the church. Dixon, MO: Rare Christian Books.
- Ravenhill, Leonard (n.d.). No greater than his prayer life. Wheaton, IL: TEAM.
- Ravenhill, Leonard (1959). Why Revival Tarries. Minneapolis: Bethany House Publishers.
- Ravenhill, Leonard (1961). Meat For Men. Minneapolis: Bethany House Publishers.
- Ravenhill, Leonard; Otis, Fuller David (1961). A Treasury of Prayer. Doral, FL: Christian Litho, INC.
- Ravenhill, Leonard (1962). Revival Praying. Minneapolis: Bethany House Publishers.
- Ravenhill, Leonard (1963). Tried & Transfigured. Minneapolis: Bethany House Publishers.
- Ravenhill, Leonard (1964). Zeal - love ablaze!. Minneapolis: Bethany House Publishers.
- Ravenhill, Leonard (1971). Sodom Had No Bible. Minneapolis: Bethany House Publishers.
- Ravenhill, Leonard (1979). America is Too Young To Die. Minneapolis: Bethany House Publishers.
- Ravenhill, Leonard (1981). Where are the Elijahs of God?. Lindale, TX: Last Days Ministries.
- Ravenhill, Leonard (1982). Prayer. Lindale, TX: Last Days Ministries.
- Ravenhill, Leonard (1983). Revival, God's way. Minneapolis: Bethany House Publishers.
- Ravenhill, Leonard (1995). Heart breathings : in poetry and prose. Stoke-on-Trent [UK]: Harvey & Tait.
