= Samuel Chadwick =

American Methodist minister (1860–1932)

Samuel Chadwick (1860–1932) was a Wesleyan Methodist minister. He served as President of the Wesleyan Methodist Conference, 1918–1919.

== Early life ==
Samuel Chadwick was born in Burnley, Lancashire in the industrialised north of England into a devout Methodist family. His father worked in a cotton mill and, at the age of 8, Samuel joined him, working 12-hour shifts. At the age of 21, he became a lay pastor at nearby Stacksteads.

== Epiphany ==
After a major awakening and deepening of his faith in his late twenties via a personal epiphany after which he burned all his early sermons, he moved on to larger congregations and greater popularity. After a few years preaching in Edinburgh and at a new chapel in Glasgow he was ordained in 1890 and returned to England as Superintendent of the Leeds Mission.

== Cliff College ==
In 1904 Chadwick began lecturing weekly at Cliff College, a Methodist lay training centre, commuting from Leeds. In 1907, he was appointed to a faculty position as a biblical and theological tutor. Although he was doing mission work in the South Yorkshire Coalfield when the Principal of Cliff died in 1912, he immediately returned to the school and was formally appointed principal in 1913, remaining in that post for the rest of his career.

Famed outdoor evangelist Leonard Ravenhill was educated at Cliff College during Chadwick's tenure.

At Cliff, Chadwick wrote The Way to Pentecost, which went to print as he was dying in 1932. He also wrote The Call to Christian Perfection. Chadwick's works have been reprinted often since his death, and continue to be reprinted in new editions under various titles for modern study.

The Way to Pentecost contains this popular quote:

The soul's safety is in its heat. Truth without enthusiasm, morality without emotion, ritual without soul, make for a Church without power. Destitute of the Fire of God, nothing else counts; possessing Fire, nothing else matters.

Another of his most widely published quotes is:

The one concern of the devil is to keep Christians from praying. He fears nothing from prayerless studies, prayerless work, and prayerless religion. He laughs at our toil, mocks at our wisdom, but trembles when we pray.

== Influences and theology ==
Chadwick was strongly influenced by the Arminian stance of Wesleyan Theologian William Burt Pope.

== Works ==
This is not an exhaustive list. Numerous editions under various titles have appeared since Chadwick's death.

- Humanity and God (1905), 356 pages, ASIN B00089ZBA2.
- The Path of Prayer (2001), 132 pages, ISBN 0-87508-578-4.
- The Way to Pentecost (1932) 64 page e-book in PDF format, accessed 31 May 2008. Also see 170 page reprint (2001), ISBN 0-87508-579-2.
- What is Meant by Conversion (1905)

=== Posthumous ===
- The Gospel of the Cross (1935)
- The Call to Christian Perfection (1936) 44 page e-book in PDF format, accessed 22 October 2006.
- Complete Works of Samuel Chadwick (2016)
