= KMOA =

Radio station in Nuʻuuli, American Samoa

Nuʻuuli, American Samoa; American Samoa
- Frequency: 89.7 MHz

Programming
- Format: Non-commercial educational

Ownership
- Owner: Global Teen Challenge; (Teen Challenge of American Samoa)

History
- Call sign meaning: SaMOA

Technical information
- Licensing authority: FCC
- Facility ID: 173422
- Class: C2
- ERP: 1,500 watts
- HAAT: 446 meters (1,463 ft)
- Transmitter coordinates: 14°16′12″S 170°41′10″W

Links
- Public license information: Public file; LMS

KMOA (89.7 FM) is a non-commercial educational radio station licensed to serve the community of Nuʻuuli, a village on the central east coast of Tutuila Island, American Samoa. The station is owned by Global Teen Challenge and the broadcast license is held by Teen Challenge of American Samoa.

== History ==
In October 2007, Society of Pure Truth Ministries, Inc., applied to the U.S. Federal Communications Commission (FCC) for a construction permit for a new broadcast radio station. The FCC granted this permit on January 8, 2009, with a scheduled expiration date of January 8, 2012. The new station was assigned call sign "KMOA" on January 30, 2009.

In March 2009, Society of Pure Truth Ministries sold the permit for KMOA to San Diego, California-based Horizon Christian Fellowship for the nominal amount of $10. The FCC approved the sale on May 7, 2009, and the transaction was consummated on May 21, 2009. In August 2011, with construction nearly completed, Horizon Christian Fellowship sold the KMOA permit to Columbus, Georgia-based Teen Challenge International. The transfer gained FCC approval on October 12, 2011, and formal consummation of the deal occurred on October 13, 2011.

After construction and testing were completed in early January 2012, the station was granted its broadcast license on January 20, 2012.

Effective July 26, 2019, the station's license was donated to Teen Challenge of American Samoa.
