= Nicky Cruz =

Puerto Rican Christian evangelist

- Born: December 6, 1938 (age 87); Las Piedras, Puerto Rico
- Occupation: Christian minister
- Writing career
- Notable works: Run Baby Run, One Holy Fire, Soul Obsession, The Devil Has No Mother
- Website: nickycruz.org

Nicky Cruz (born December 6, 1938) is a Puerto Rican Christian evangelist, the founder of Nicky Cruz Outreach, an evangelistic Christian ministry. He was also once the director of Teen Challenge, serving under David Wilkerson before founding another ministry home himself in California. Prior to his conversion he was the leader of a New York City gang, the Mau Maus.

== Early life ==
Cruz was born in Las Piedras, Puerto Rico where he was raised by his parents. His parents practiced brujeria and were followers of spiritism ("espiritismo"). They mentally abused him; his own mother would call him "Son of Satan". The neighborhood in which he lived was one of the worst in Puerto Rico and Cruz was always getting into trouble. According to his book Run Baby Run, his parents sent him to live with his brother in New York City when he was 15, and Cruz soon ran away and started living on the streets of the city. He became a member of the Mau Maus street gang, and about six months later Cruz was selected Warlord of the gang. He quickly rose to become their president.

== Conversion to Christianity ==
Shortly after Cruz became the gang leader, David Wilkerson was preaching in the neighborhood when Cruz encountered him. The preacher told Cruz that "Jesus loved him and would never stop loving him". Cruz responded by slapping Wilkerson and threatening to kill him. Wilkerson attempted again later to convert Cruz, and received the same response.

Later, Wilkerson organised an evangelistic meeting in the neighborhood with the intent of converting the Mau Maus. When Cruz heard about it, he headed with some of the members of his gang for the boxing arena where the meeting was being held, on a bus sent specially by Wilkerson. According to Cruz, when he arrived at the arena, he "felt guilty about the things that he had done" and began to pray. After preaching, Wilkerson asked the Mau Maus to take up a collection. Cruz volunteered and led a group of the gang through the crowd, insisting on people giving money. Going backstage, he saw an exit, but convinced the group to give the money to Wilkerson on stage. Later, Wilkerson gave an altar call, and a large number of gang members responded. Wilkerson prayed with Cruz, and Cruz asked God to forgive him.

Afterward, Cruz and some of the gang members who were converted went to the police and turned in all of their bricks, handguns and knives, shocking the police officers in the station. They stated that if they had seen the group approaching, they probably would have shot them down. Cruz began to study the Bible and went to Bible college. He became a preacher and returned to his old neighborhood, where he preached and converted more of the Mau Maus to Christianity, including the gang's new leader, Israel Narvaez.

== Written works ==
External audio
- A segment from the film "The Cross and the Switchblade" on YouTube

Nicky Cruz has written two autobiographies, Run Baby Run, with Jamie Buckingham (1968), and Soul Obsession, with Frank Martin (2005). He has also written several books with a Christian theme, including The Corruptors (1974), The Magnificent Three (1976), and Destined to Win (1991). Cruz's conversion was depicted in the 1970 film The Cross and the Switchblade starring Erik Estrada as Cruz and Pat Boone as David Wilkerson. In 2013, Cruz authored The Devil Has No Mother which shares Cruz's understanding of the devil's hunger to gain power, but contrasts this with God's ability to nevertheless win the day.

== See also ==
- List of Puerto Rican writers
- List of Puerto Ricans
- Puerto Rican literature
