= Zapivka =

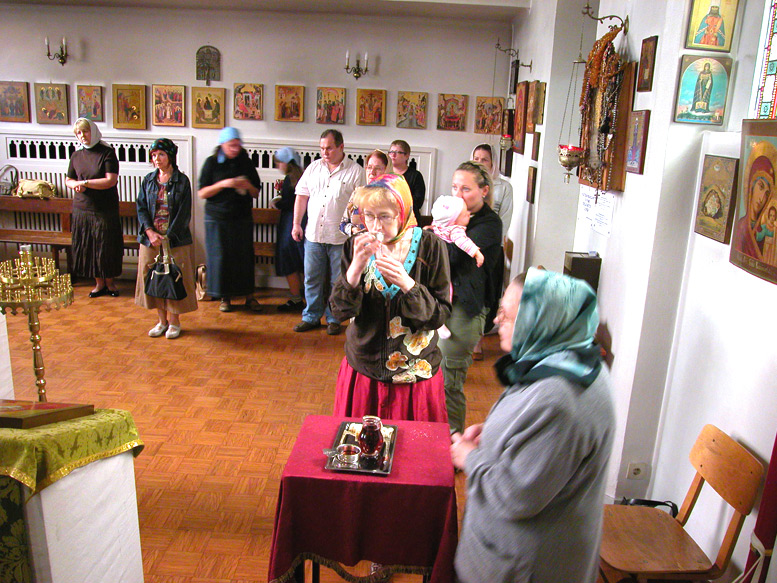
The faithful partaking of zapivka, Holy Protection Russian Orthodox Church, Düsseldorf.

Zapivka (Russian: Запивка, "washing down") is the liturgical practice in certain Orthodox Churches and certain Byzantine Rite Catholic Churches whereby the faithful will partake of antidoron (blessed bread) and some wine diluted with warm water after receiving Holy Communion.

The purpose of zapivka is to wash any remnants of the Body and Blood of Christ from the mouth lest anyone inadvertently spit some of the Sacred Mysteries (Eucharist) out. The method of partaking of the zapivka is to first take three sips of the warm wine, then consume the antidoron.

The clergy also partake of zapivka. The priests and deacons who communicated will partake of the zapivka immediately after receiving Holy Communion, except for the deacon (or priest, if there is no deacon serving) who will perform the ablutions (consume the remaining Sacred Mysteries). He will then receive zapivka after finishing the ablutions. After consuming the zapivka all of the clergy will rinse their hands and their lips.
