= Global Teen Challenge =

Christian organization for teenagers struggling with addiction

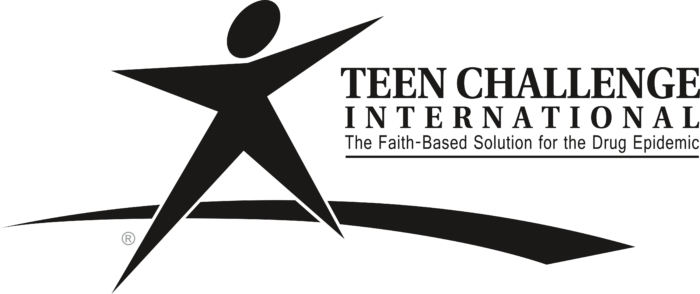
- Founded: 1960
- Founder: David Wilkerson
- Location: Columbus, Georgia, United States
- Region served: 129 countries
- Key people: Dr. Jerry Nance
- Website: globaltc.org

Global Teen Challenge is a network of Christian faith-based corporations intended to provide rehabilitation services to people struggling with addiction. It was founded by David Wilkerson in 1960. The global headquarters is in Columbus, Georgia, United States.

There is little public record of what goes on in Teen Challenge facilities. Questions have been raised about whether the practices of the organization are abusive and cult-like. In the United States, there are no federal laws or agencies that regulate organizations like Teen Challenge.

== History ==
Teen Challenge was founded in 1961 by David Wilkerson, an Assemblies of God pastor who left a rural Pennsylvania church to work on the street among teenage gang members and socially marginalized people in New York City and who, perhaps, is best known for later authoring The Cross and the Switchblade and founding Times Square Church. Teen Challenge started its first residential program in December 1962, in a house in Brooklyn, New York.

In 1973, 12 years after the ministry began, Teen Challenge established a national headquarters. In 1995, Global Teen Challenge was founded to assist the growing number of Teen Challenges starting up outside the US, but struggling to acquire the necessary resources and training. In 2022, Global Teen Challenge had more than 1,400 accommodation centers in 129 countries around the world.

== Programs ==
The organization offers rehabilitation programs of a general duration of 12 months to help young people to get out of addictions of all kinds (alcoholism, drugs, crime, prostitution, etc.). In the past it forced participants to sign ‘civil rights waivers’ under duress, and to this day requires parents/guardians to sign waivers giving over unconditional control of their child, and stating they will not “interfere with the custody and management of said minor in any way.” The centres use practices such as enforced silence and banning communication (verbal and visual) between participants for perceived infractions, or on suspicion that the participant is gay - sometimes for months; monitoring and censoring all phone conversations with people outside of the programme (e.g., parents).

== Studies of program effectiveness ==
In 1973, Archie Johnston compared results of Teen Challenge with that of a transactional analysis approach at a Terminal Island Federal Correctional Institution therapeutic community, and with a third group who received no treatment. While the numbers of subjects was small (17 in each group), he found evidence to support his recommendation that, while Teen Challenge was an "effective" treatment (with a drug recidivism rate after 29 months of 32%), Transactional Analysis was a "very effective" treatment (with a comparable 16% rate), suggesting that perhaps the lower recidivism rates were a result of TA changing the addiction concept of the self-image more thoroughly and at a slower pace. He hoped that Teen Challenge would incorporate some psychotherapy into their treatment model.

A Wilder Research study of 141 former residents who graduated Minnesota Teen Challenge between 2007 and 2009 reported that 74 percent of adult program graduates (10 percent of respondents were teenagers) reported no use in the previous six months, 58 percent had attended school since graduating, 74 percent were employed, and 53 percent rated the overall quality of Minnesota Teen Challenge as “outstanding”. When asked to name what helped most, the faith-based aspects and the staff were mentioned most frequently.

Aaron Bicknese tracked down 59 former Teen Challenge students in 1995, in order to compare them with a similar group of addicts who had spent one or two months in a hospital rehabilitation program. His results, part of his PhD dissertation, were published in "The Teen Challenge Drug Treatment Program in Comparative Perspective". Bicknese found that Teen Challenge graduates reported less drug-use recidivism than the hospital-program graduates, but not less than those who continued attending Alcoholics Anonymous after the hospital program. His results also showed that Teen Challenge graduates were much more likely to be employed, with 18 of the 59 working at Teen Challenge itself, which utilizes graduates in its operations.

Much of these results were to Teen Challenge's benefit, and the high success rates (up to 86%) he found have been quoted in numerous Teen Challenge and Christian Counseling websites. According to a 2001 New York Times item, some social scientists complain that the 86 percent success rate of Teen Challenge disregards those who dropped out of the program, and that like many private and religious organizations, Teen Challenge selects its clients. Teen Challenge reports that 25 to 30 percent typically drop out in the program's first four-month phase, and 10 percent more in the next eight months. In their testimony before the United States House Committee on Ways and Means, Texas Freedom Network Education Fund, have claimed that the much-quoted success rates "dramatically distort the truth", due to the lack of reference to the drop-out rate. Doug Wever, author of "The Teen Challenge Therapeutic Model", stated, "I would respectfully suggest that the Texas Freedom Network's position here is overstated in that it's not unusual at all for the research design of effectiveness studies to look only at graduates; therefore the outcomes of these independent studies do provide a legitimate and dramatic basis for comparison given the results. At the same time, Teen Challenge must be careful to communicate what has actually been measured."

== Public policy effects ==
In 1995, auditors from the Texas Commission for Alcohol and Drug Abuse (TCADA) demanded that Teen Challenge obtain state licensing and employ state-licensed counselors. As a result, then-Governor George W. Bush publicly defended Teen Challenge and pursued alternative licensing procedures for faith-based organizations. "Teen Challenge should view itself as a pioneer in how Texas approaches faith-based programs. I'll call together people, ask them to make recommendations... licensing standards have to be different from what they are today," Bush said.

== Controversies ==
The organization has faced accusations regarding severe abuse and ill treatment at its rehabilitation camps throughout the early 2000s and on. The organization allegedly encompasses certain unlicensed religious homes that may operate outside child protection laws due to religious exemptions in the state of Florida. They have also been linked to the controversial practice of conversion therapy. The organization has allegedly contributed to the near-death of Samson Lehman, who was 15 years old at the time. Authorities in Florida have responded to at least 165 allegations of abuse and neglect by the organization from the 2000's-2012 for situations including sex abuse and physical injury. The organization has been involved in at least two lawsuits alleging abuse and neglect by parents of minors involved with the organization.

In 2001, John Castellani, the former President of Teen Challenge USA, before a House Government Reform subcommittee examining the efficacy of religious social service providers, said that Teen Challenge does not hire non-Christians as employees. When asked if the group takes non-Christians as clients, he said yes, and boasted that some Jews who finish his Teen Challenge program become "completed Jews." The "completed Jews" phrase has been used by some Christians and Messianic Jews to refer to people who previously followed Judaism and have since become believers in Yeshua (Jesus); many Jewish groups consider it offensive because of the implication that those who do not believe in Jesus are "incomplete". Critics of faith-based funding cite this as an example of how religious intolerance could be publicly funded.

In October 2021, an article in The New Yorker described how 15-year-old Emma Burris was allegedly forced into Teen Challenge and forced to surrender her baby for adoption.

In the United States, there are no federal laws or agencies that regulate organizations like Teen Challenge. When a Texas regulatory agency threatened to shut down a Teen Challenge program in San Antonio in the 1990s due to treatments that did not comply with the state’s licensing and training requirements, Texas Governor George W. Bush created an exemption for faith-based programs.

== See also ==
- KMOA: GTC radio station in American Samoa
