= Times Square Church =

Church in Manhattan, New York

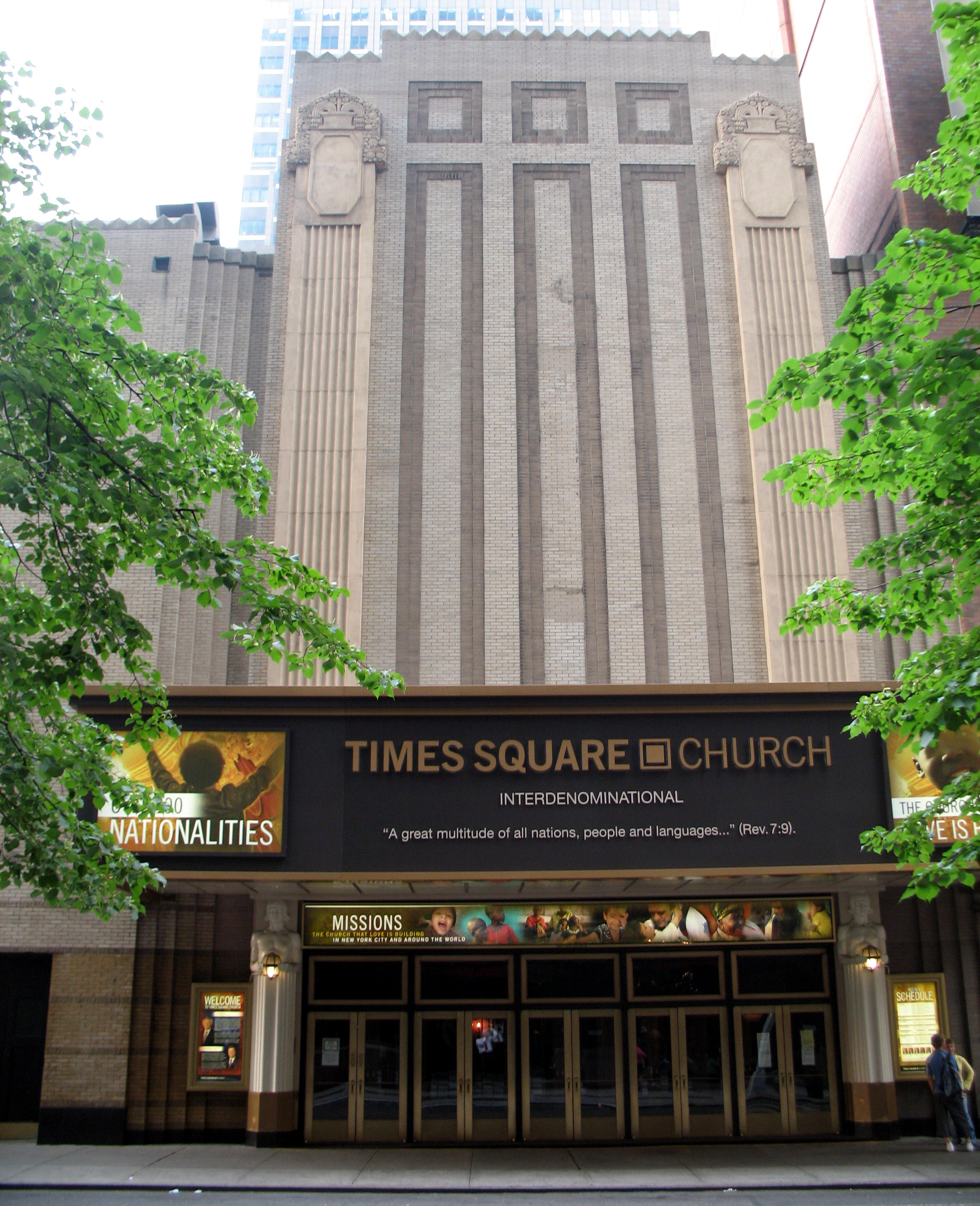
- Front entrance of Times Square Church in the Mark Hellinger Theatre

- Location within New York City
- 40°45′45″N 73°59′03″W
- Location: 237 West 51st Street; New York City, New York 10019
- Country: United States
- Denomination: Pentecostal
- Website: Official website

History
- Founded: October 1987
- Founder: David Wilkerson

Clergy
- Pastor(s): Tim Dilena; Carter Conlon; Patrick Pierre; Teresa Conlon

Times Square Church is a Pentecostal congregation located at the Mark Hellinger Theatre on 237 West 51st Street in the Theater District of Manhattan in New York City. Times Square Church was founded by Pastor David Wilkerson in 1987, and bought the Mark Hellinger Theatre in 1991.

== Church history ==
Times Square Church was founded by David Wilkerson in 1987. At the time, Times Square frequently hosted X-rated films and strip clubs, and prostitution and drug addiction were commonplace in the area. Wilkerson opened the church in response to what he described as "the physically destitute and spiritually dead people" he saw among the pimps, runaways and crack dealers who populated the area. Times Square Church briefly held its services at The Town Hall on 43rd Street in Manhattan and then in the Nederlander Theatre on 41st Street.

In February 1989, the Nederlander Organization leased the Mark Hellinger Theatre to Times Square Church. Times Square Church purchased the building from the Nederlander Organization for an undisclosed amount in 1991. At the time, the value of the building was estimated to be between $15 million and $18 million. Upon its purchase, Pastor Donald W. Wilkerson, brother of David Wilkerson and one of the church leaders, declared that the theater would not be altered, saying, "The theater is landmarked and it will remain the same." The church was described as evangelical pentecostal, and was headed by three pastors: David Wilkerson; his brother, Donald Wilkerson; and Robert Phillips. The theater is still the church's current location on 51st Street.

In 2001, David Wilkerson entrusted the senior pastorate to Carter Conlon, a former evangelical pastor from eastern Canada and associate pastor at Times Square Church from 1994 to 2001. It also features visiting missionaries and ministers.

From 2007 to 2009 the church organized an event called Prayer in the Square, a prayer rally which took place in Times Square.

On May 5, 2020, Tim Dilena became Senior Pastor, the third since the church’s founding. He had a lifelong association with founding pastor David Wilkerson and has regularly preached at the church for many years.

== Building ==
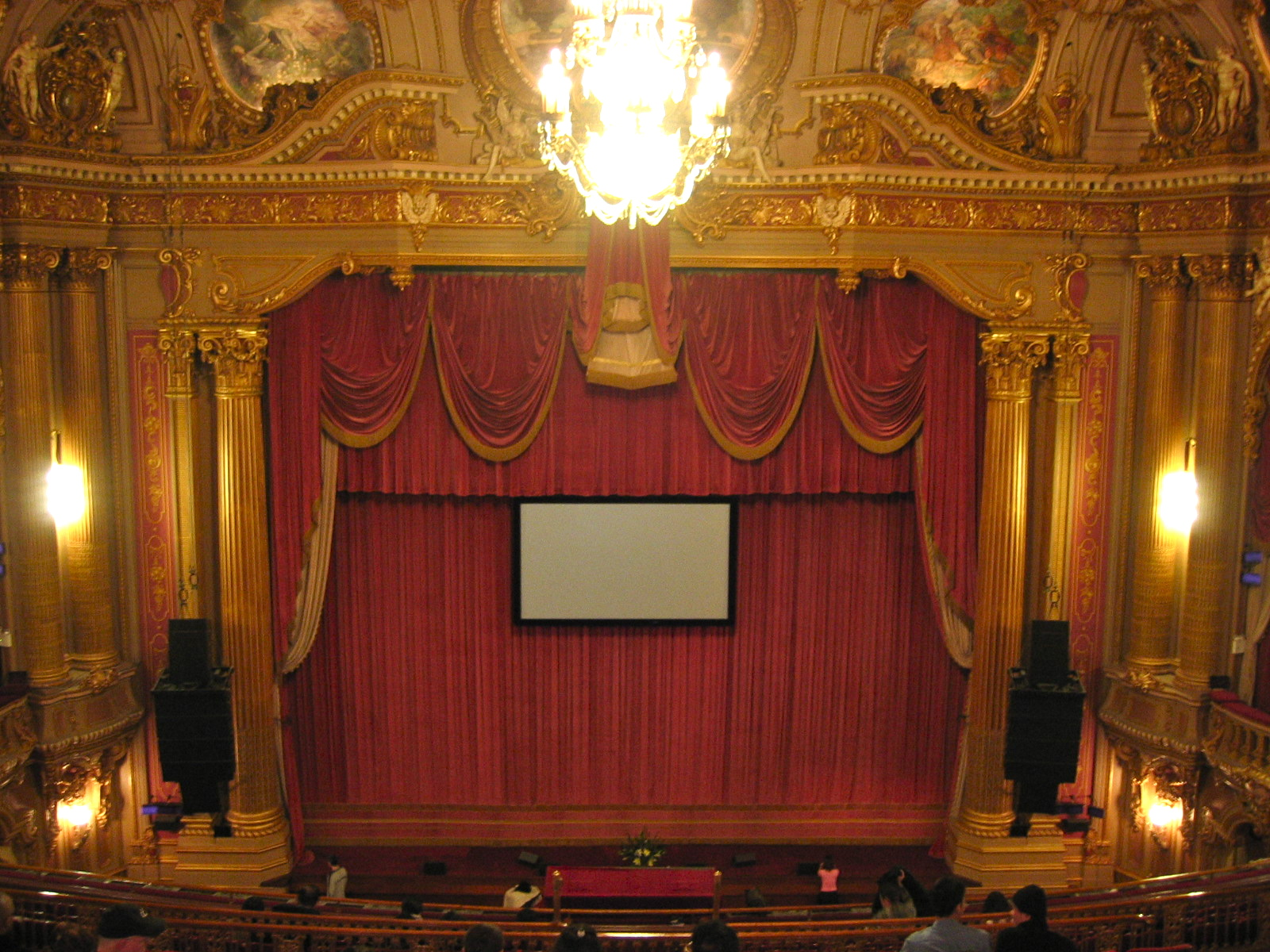
Mark Hellinger Theatre, 2006

The Mark Hellinger Theatre was originally built by Warner Bros. in 1930 as a movie palace, the Warner Hollywood Theatre, which was later converted to a Broadway venue. It has 1,603 seats. Notable Broadway musicals that have played at the theater include My Fair Lady, Jesus Christ Superstar, and the Katharine Hepburn musical Coco.
