= The Cross and the Switchblade =

1963 biographical book by David Wilkerson

- Author: David Wilkerson; John and Elizabeth Sherrill
- Language: English
- Genre: Biography, Crime, Christianity
- Publisher: Bernard Geis Associates
- Publication date: January 1, 1963
- Publication place: United States
- Media type: Print
- OCLC: 317503776
- Dewey Decimal: 258
- LC Class: BV4464.5 .W5 1963

The Cross and the Switchblade is an autobiographical book written by the Rev. David Wilkerson with John and Elizabeth Sherrill, published by Bernard Geis Associates in 1963.

== Summary ==
In 1958, Pentecostal pastor David Wilkerson of Assemblies of God read an article in Life about seven teenagers who were members of a criminal gang and felt the Holy Spirit move him with compassion and was drawn to go to New York, in order to preach to them. On his arrival, Wilkerson went to the court in which teenagers were being prosecuted. He entered the room and asked the judge for permission to tell them something, but the judge ejected him. Upon leaving, someone took a photo of Wilkerson, who then became known as the Bible preacher "who had interrupted the gang trial". Soon after this, he began a street ministry to young drug addicts and gang members, which he continued into the 1960s. He founded Teen Challenge in 1958, an evangelical Christian addiction recovery program in Brooklyn with a network of Christian social and evangelizing work centers.

== Reception ==
The book became a bestseller, with more than 15 million copies distributed in over 30 languages.

== Adaptations ==
In 1970, a film adaptation was released, starring Pat Boone as David Wilkerson and Erik Estrada (in his screen debut) as Nicky Cruz, the teen gang member whose life was transformed by Wilkerson's ministry. A comic book adaptation was also produced.

== See also ==
- Jackie Pullinger
