= Antidoron =

Type of eucharistic bread

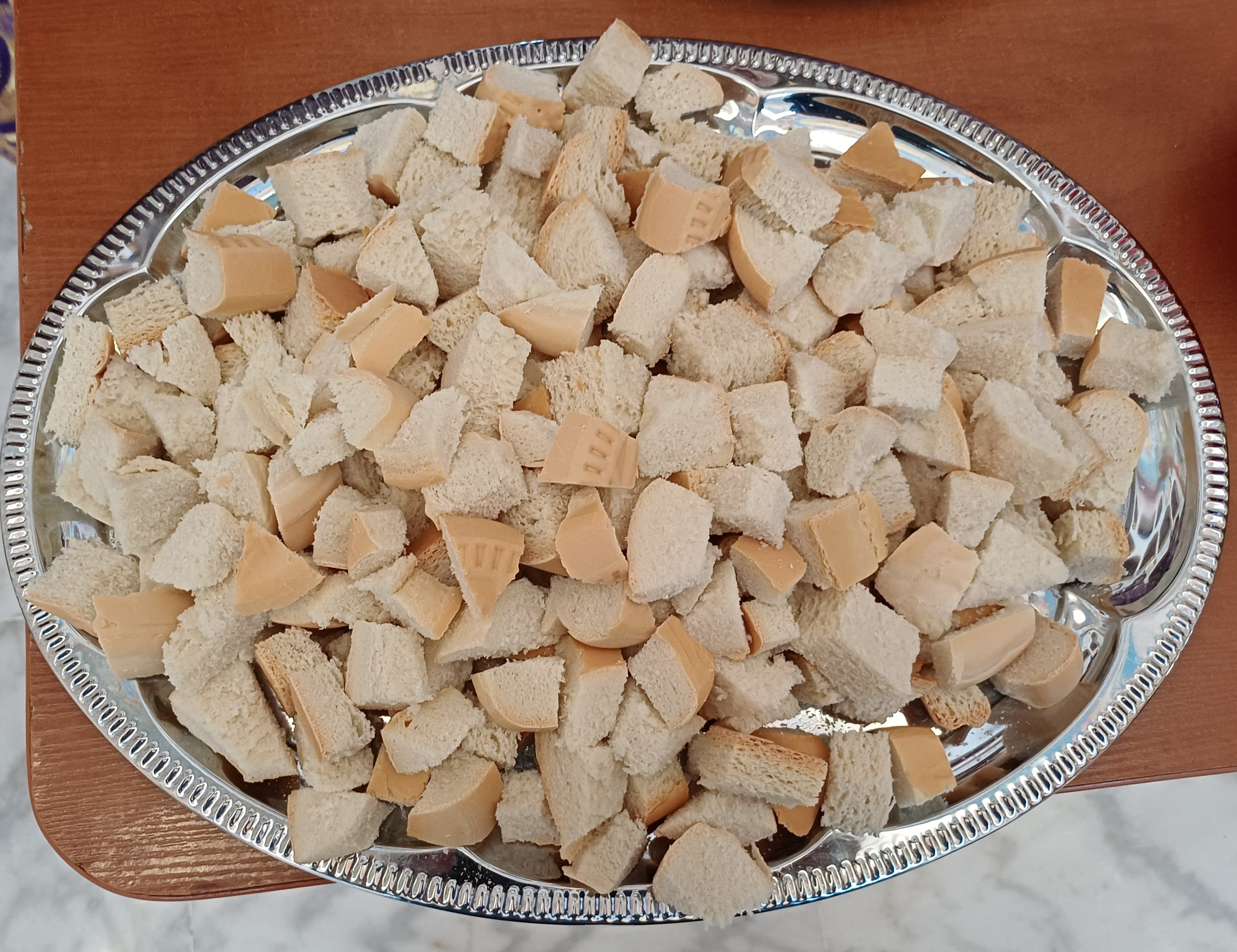
- Type: Blessed Bread
- Main ingredients: Remains of the loaves of prosphora which were not used for the consecration which is later blessed

The antidoron (Greek: Ἀντίδωρον, Antídōron) is ordinary leavened bread which is blessed but not consecrated and distributed in certain Eastern Orthodox Churches and certain Eastern Catholic Churches that use the Byzantine Rite. It comes from the remains of the loaves of bread (prosphora) from which portions are cut for consecration as the Eucharist during the Divine Liturgy. The word Ἀντίδωρον means "instead of gifts", i.e., "instead of the Eucharistic gifts".

A blessed bread akin to antidoron, pain bénit, is used in some French and Canadian Latin Catholic churches as a substitute for those unable to receive the Eucharist. In Late Medieval England, the term Holy Loaf was used.

== Practice ==
=== Eastern Orthodox Christianity ===
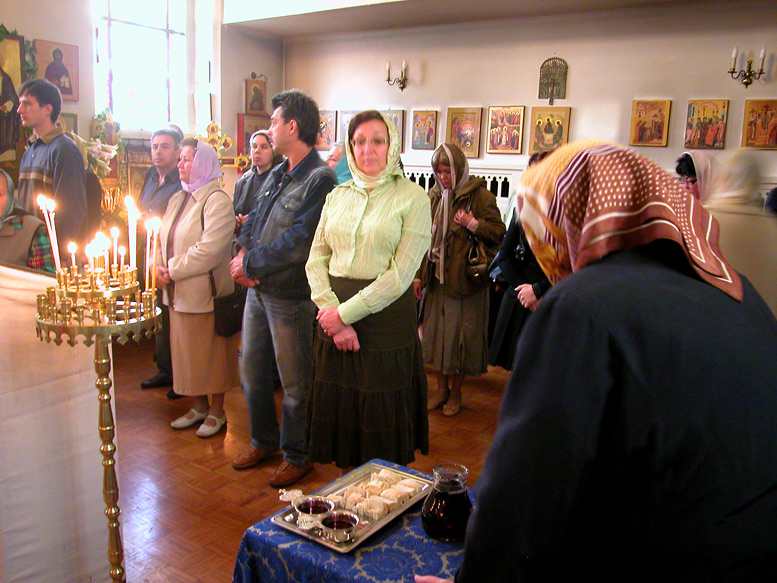
The faithful preparing to receive Holy Communion. In the foreground are wine and antidoron which the communicants will partake of after receiving the Body and Blood of Christ.

In the Orthodox Church, blessed antidoron is distributed after every Divine Liturgy. During the Prothesis (Liturgy of Preparation, at which the wine and bread are prepared on the Table of Oblation), the priest will bless each prosphoron as he takes it up to remove particles and place them on the diskos (paten). The remainder of the prosphora is cut into fragments and kept aside in a bowl or salver. In some jurisdictions it is the custom at the end of the Anaphora for the altar server to hand the bowl of antidoron to the priest who will make the Sign of the Cross with it over the chalice and diskos during the hymn, It is Truly Meet.

Since the Eucharist is essentially a meal, in the Russian Orthodox tradition some of the antidoron is placed on a tray together with ordinary wine and is consumed by the communicants immediately after they receive Holy Communion.

At the conclusion of the liturgy, the antidoron is distributed to the faithful as they come up to kiss the blessing cross. Antidoron is not considered a sacrament and is explicitly not consecrated during the Eucharist. Therefore, non-Orthodox present at the liturgy, who are not admitted to partake of the consecrated bread and wine, are often encouraged to receive the antidoron as an expression of Christian fellowship and love.

Because the antidoron is blessed, some jurisdictions and customs mandate that it be consumed only after fasting. The canonical regulations of the Eastern Orthodox Church state that the antidoron should be consumed before leaving the church, and that it should not be distributed to unbelievers or to persons undergoing penance before absolution, but variances are allowed. For instance, it is the custom in many Orthodox parishes to distribute the antidoron to visitors and catechumens as a sign of hospitality, or to bring a few pieces home to a relative who could not attend the liturgy.

On Bright Saturday, in place of (or in addition to) the normal antidoron, the Paschal Artos is cut up and distributed at the end of the liturgy.

=== Eastern Catholicism ===
In the Greek Catholic (Byzantine) churches of Austria and Hungary, the antidoron is presently given only on rare occasions during the year, chiefly on the Bright Saturday (Saturday in Easter week). While among the Greek (Roman) Catholics of Italy it is usually given only on Holy Thursday, the Feast of the Assumption, that of Saint Nicholas of Myra, and at certain week-day services in Lent; although according to some local customs it is given on other days.

== History ==
The earliest historical references to this custom are in fact found in the Western Church. It is mentioned in the 118th letter of Augustine of Hippo to Januarius (now known as the 54th letter in the new order), and in the canons of a local council in Gaul in the seventh century. Originally it was a substitute, or solatium, for such of the faithful as were not properly prepared to receive Holy Communion or were unable to get to the eucharistic sacrifice. If they could not partake of the sacrament, for instance because of not having fulfilled the obligatory fast or for being in a state of mortal sin, they had the consolation of partaking of the non-consecrated liturgical bread which had been blessed and from which the portions for the consecration had been taken.

In the Eastern Church, mention of the antidoron began to appear in about the ninth and tenth centuries. Germanus of Constantinople mentions it in his treatise "The Explanation of the Liturgy". Subsequent to him, many writers of the Eastern Church (Balsamon, Colina, Pachemeros) have written on the custom of giving the antidoron.

While the practice of blessing and distributing antidoron still continues in the Byzantine Rite churches, the practice is rare among Western Christians, and now only survives in the Latin Church as the pain bénit given in French churches and cathedrals after High Mass, as well as in certain churches of Canada, and occasionally in Italy, on certain feasts (e.g. of Saint Hubert, Saint Anthony of Padua). A similar custom also survives among the Saint Thomas Christians of the Malabar coast in India.

=== Holy loaf ===
Prior to the English Reformation, there was a tradition where households took turns to bake and present a "holy loaf" to the parish church. This was blessed and distributed at the end of mass, sometimes in sizes corresponding to the social status of the recipient. Historian Peter Marshall describes the baking of this bread as a "quasi-liturgical role for local women".

== See also ==
- Christmas wafer
- Sacramental bread
- Artoklasia
