= David Wilkerson =

American Pentecostal evangelist (1931 – 2011)

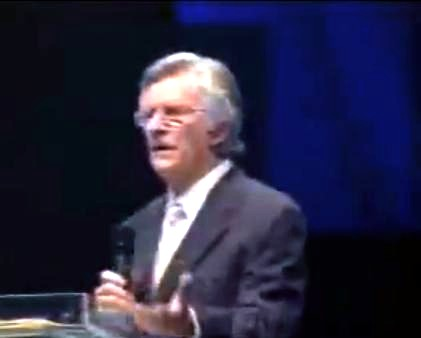
- Wilkerson in 2008

Personal life
- Born: May 19, 1931 Hammond, Indiana, U.S.
- Died: April 27, 2011 (aged 79) Cuney, Texas, U.S.
- Spouse: Gwen Wilkerson (died July 5, 2012)
- Website: worldchallenge.org globaltc.org//

Religious life
- Religion: Christian
- Denomination: Pentecostal
- Church: Times Square Church

Senior posting
- Post: Evangelist; Pastor
- Period in office: 1950 – 2011

David Ray Wilkerson (May 19, 1931 – April 27, 2011) was an American Christian evangelist, best known for his book The Cross and the Switchblade. He was the founder of the addiction recovery program Teen Challenge and the global missionary organization World Challenge, and founding pastor of the interdenominational Times Square Church in New York City.

Wilkerson emphasized such Christian beliefs as God's holiness and righteousness, God's love toward humans and especially Christian views of Jesus. Wilkerson tried to avoid categorizing Christians into distinct groups according to the denomination to which they belong.

== Early years ==
David Wilkerson was born in 1931 in Indiana. He was the second son of a family of Pentecostal Christian preachers, and he was raised in Barnesboro, Pennsylvania, in a house "full of Bibles". His paternal grandfather and his father, Kenneth, were ministers. According to Wilkerson's own testimony, he was baptized with the Holy Spirit at the age of eight.

The young Wilkerson began to preach when he was about fourteen. After high school, he entered the Central Bible College in Springfield, Missouri. The school was affiliated with the Assemblies of God. In 1952, he was ordained as a minister.

== Life and Ministry ==
=== New York gangs and Teen Challenge ===
Wilkerson married Gwendolyn Rose "Gwen" Carosso in 1953. He served as a pastor in small churches in Scottdale and Philipsburg in Pennsylvania, until he saw a photograph in Life Magazine in early 1958 of seven teenagers who were members of gangs in New York known as "Egyptian Kings" and the "Dragons" which had merged into a single gang called the "Egyptian Dragons". He felt a calling from God to minister to those gangs. He later wrote that he felt the Holy Spirit move him with compassion and was drawn to go to New York in order to preach to them. On his arrival, Wilkerson went to the court in which teenagers were being prosecuted. He entered the room and asked the judge for permission to tell them something, but the judge ejected him. Upon leaving, someone took a photo of Wilkerson, who then became known as the Bible preacher "who had interrupted the gang trial". Soon after this, he began a street ministry to young drug addicts and gang members, which he continued into the 1960s.

He founded Teen Challenge in 1958, an evangelical Christian addiction recovery program in Brooklyn with a network of Christian social and evangelizing work centers. This would expand to "Global Teen Challenge" by 1995. In 2019, GTC reported activity in 140 different nations.

=== The Cross and the Switchblade ===
Wilkerson gained national recognition after he co-authored the book The Cross and the Switchblade in 1962 with John and Elizabeth Sherrill about his street ministry. A joint autobiography, The Cross and the Switchblade sold over 15 million copies in over thirty languages, and was included in a 2006 issue of Christianity Today listing the "Top 50 Books That Have Shaped Evangelicals". In the book, Wilkerson tells of the conversion of gang member Nicky Cruz, who later became an evangelist himself and wrote the autobiographical Run Baby Run. Nicky had been the leader of the "Mau Maus" gang, and he and his friend Israel Narvaez converted to Christianity after hearing Wilkerson preach.

The 1970 film The Cross and the Switchblade, starring Pat Boone as Wilkerson and Erik Estrada as Cruz, is an adaptation of the 1962 book. It was directed by Don Murray.

=== Goodniks and World Challenge ===
In 1967, Wilkerson began Youth Crusades, an evangelistic ministry aimed at teenagers whom Wilkerson called "goodniks"—middle-class youth who were restless and bored. His goal was to prevent them from becoming heavily involved with drugs, alcohol, or violence. Through this ministry, the CURE Corps (Collegiate Urban Renewal Effort) was founded. In 1971, Wilkerson moved his ministry headquarters to Lindale, Texas. On September 22, he founded World Challenge, a non-profit organization that aims to evangelize globally. Today, World Challenge states it "shares the message of the gospel and serves orphans and widows". The organization is currently led by Wilkerson's son Gary.

=== Times Square Church ===
Having been splitting time between Texas and New York, Wilkerson oft recounted an experience that persuaded him to stay and work in New York. In 1986, while walking down 42nd street late at night, Wilkerson said

"My heart broke over what I saw. At that time, Times Square was populated mainly by prostitutes and pimps, runaways, drug addicts and hustlers, along with live peep shows and X-rated movie houses. I cried out for God to do something—anything—to help the physically destitute and spiritually dead people I saw."

Wilkerson claimed the Holy Spirit called him to return to New York City and to raise up a ministry in Times Square,

"I wept and prayed, ‘God, you’ve got to raise up a testimony in this hellish place. The answer was not what I wanted to hear: ‘Well, you know the city. You’ve been here. You do it.’”.

This led to his founding of Times Square Church, which opened its doors in October 1987 with Wilkerson as pastor. The church first occupied rented auditoriums in Times Square (Town Hall and the Nederlander Theater), before moving to the historic Mark Hellinger Theatre in 1989, from which it has operated since.

Wilkerson did not preach in the name of any specific denomination. Instead, he focused on biblical preaching with the aim of encouraging people to seek God through a personal and deeper knowledge of Jesus Christ and the experience of the Holy Spirit. He said:

I am not preaching some denominational doctrine, This church does not belong to any denomination. We are not Assemblies of God, we are not Baptist, we're not Methodist, we're not Catholic. We're just Holy Ghost people believing this book [The Bible].

Throughout his ministry, Wilkerson had contact with many other prominent Christian ministers, including Leonard Ravenhill, who was his friend, and Ray Comfort, whom Wilkerson met in 1992 after listening to a message called Hell's Best Kept Secret.

Through the 1990s, Wilkerson focused on building up his ministry and expanding its associated organizations and their goals.

Wilkerson and his wife Gwen moved to New York City at the inception of Times Square Church in 1987, and in 2006 began splitting their time between New York and Texas. They had four children, Gary, Debbie, Bonnie, and Evan, and eleven grandchildren.

== Death ==
On the afternoon of April 27, 2011, less than a month from his 80th birthday, Wilkerson died in a traffic accident. He had a head-on collision with an 18-wheeler in East Texas. It is not known what caused Wilkerson to veer to the other side of the road, but the Texas Department of Public Safety reported he was not wearing a seatbelt. He was pronounced dead at the scene; his wife Gwendolyn and the truck driver were injured.

Gwendolyn Wilkerson died a year later, on July 5, 2012, from cancer, at the age of 81.

== Bibliography ==
- End Times New Testament ISBN 978-0912376110
- Jesus Person Maturity Manual
- My Bible Speaks to Me
- Promises To Live By, ISBN 978-0830718870
- Wilkerson, David; Sherrill, John and Elizabeth Sherrill) (1962). The Cross and the Switchblade. Jove. ISBN 0-5150-9025-5.
- Twelve Angels from Hell (1965), ISBN 978-0551004238
- Born Old (1966) original title The Little People, ISBN 0-5510-1076-2
- I'm Not Mad at God (1967), ISBN 978-0871232458
- Parents on Trial (1967)
- Hey, Preach . . . You're Comin' Through! (1968) ISBN 978-0891290643
- I've Given Up On Parents (1969), ISBN 978-0340108291
- Man, Have I Got Problems (1969) ISBN 978-0515046687
- Purple Violet Squish (1969), ISBN 978-0551000483
- Rebel's Bible (1970), ISBN 978-0551007512
- Get Your Hands Off My Throat (1971), ISBN 978-8472281332
- The Untapped Generation (with Don Wilkerson) (1971), ISBN 978-1135577704
- What Every Teenager Should Know About Drugs (1971), ISBN 978-0551050679
- Jesus Person Pocket Promise Book (1972)
- The Jesus walk: Selected "why's" and "how-to's" for a closer walk with Christ (A Regal Jesus Person Maturity book) (1972), ISBN 978-0830701711
- Life on the Edge of Time (1972) ISBN 978-0800705534
- One Way To Where? (1972), ISBN 978-0830701698
- Pocket Promise Book (1972), ISBN 0-8307-0191-5
- This Is Loving? (1972), ISBN 978-0830701704
- When In Doubt, Faith It! (1972), ISBN 978-0830701681
- David Wilkerson Speaks Out (1973), ISBN 978-0871230911
- Jesus Christ Solid Rock: The Return Of Christ (with Kathryn Kuhlman, Hal Lindsey and W. A. Criswell) (1973)
- The Vision (1973), ISBN 0-515-03286-7.
- Beyond The Cross and the Switchblade (1974), ISBN 0-8912-9151-2
- Racing Toward Judgment (1976), ISBN 978-0800782764
- Wilkerson, David (1978). Sipping Saints. David Wilkerson Publications. ISBN 0-8007-8339-5.
- Suicide (1978), ISBN 978-0800786434
- Wilkerson, David (1980). Have You Felt Like Giving Up Lately?. David Wilkerson Publications. ISBN 0-8007-8481-2.
- Victory Over Sin and Self (1980) Originally titled Two of Me, ISBN 978-0800784348
- Rock Bottom (pamphlet) (1981)
- Pocket Proverbs (1983), ISBN 0-8307-0893-6
- Set the Trumpet to thy Mouth (1985), ISBN 978-0883686409
- David Wilkerson Exhorts the Church (1991) ISBN 9780829703962
- Wilkerson, David (1992). Hungry For More of Jesus. David Wilkerson Publications. ISBN 978-0800792008.
- Wilkerson, David (1996). Revival on Broadway. Wilkerson Trust Publications. ISBN 978-0966317206.
- Wilkerson, David (1998). America's Last Call, On the Brink of a Financial Holocaust. David Wilkerson Publications. ISBN 0-8836-8617-1.
- Wilkerson, David (1998). God's Plan to Protect His People in the Coming Depression. David Wilkerson Publications. ISBN 978-0883686164.
- Wilkerson, David (2000). The New Covenant Unveiled. David Wilkerson Publications. ISBN 978-0966317237.
- Wilkerson, David (2001). Hallowed Be Thy Names. David Wilkerson Publications. ISBN 0-9709326-0-X.
- Wilkerson, David (2001). Triumph Through Tragedy. David Wilkerson Publications. ISBN 978-0800793562.
- Wilkerson, David (2009). Dearly Beloved. David Wilkerson Publications. ISBN 978-0-9712187-4-1.
