= Cornerstone (Hillsong Worship album) =

Live album by Hillsong Worship
- Released: 3 July 2012
- Recorded: 30 October 2011
- Genre: Contemporary worship music
- Length: 75:48
- Label: Hillsong, Capitol, Sparrow.
- Producer: Reuben Morgan; Andrew Crawford; Co-producers: Autumn Hardman; Ben Fielding; Ryan Taubert

Hillsong Worship chronology
God Is Able (2011)	Cornerstone (2012)	Glorious Ruins (2013)

Singles from Cornerstone
- 1. "Cornerstone" Released: 22 May 2012; 2. "Hope of the World" Released: 22 May 2012

Cornerstone is the twenty-first album in the live praise and worship series of contemporary worship music by Hillsong Live. It reached No. 2 on the ARIA Albums Chart, debuted at No. 32 on the Billboard 200 chart, and became the No. 1 album on the Billboard Christian Albums chart.

Its first single was "Hope of the World", a song written by Jason Ingram, Reuben Morgan and Matthew Bronleewee, that also is available in Studio Version, in the Deluxe Edition (Digital). Two live music videos has been released on their VEVO channel: "Hope of the World" and "Cornerstone" featuring Reuben Morgan and David Ware respectively. "Cornerstone" is a reworking of the verses from Edward Mote's "My Hope Is Built on Nothing Less".

This is the last Hillsong Live album to feature Darlene Zschech as a worship leader and this is the first time that Zschech did not contribute any of her original songs.

== Recording ==
Cornerstone was recorded at the Allphones Arena in Sydney Olympic Park, the Sydney Entertainment Centre, and the Hillsong Convention Centre by Reuben Morgan, Joel Houston, Darlene Zschech and the Hillsong Live team on 30 October 2011 and in early 2012. The worship night was called "Together As One: Our Live Album Recording".

== Critical reception ==
- New Release Tuesday : I eagerly await each new Hillsong release and Cornerstone is truly stellar and is the top overall album by Hillsong LIVE. Every single song could be added to your Sunday morning worship set.
- Louder Than The Music: This album is full of great songs that will be used for times of worship.

== Extended play ==
Cornerstone is also a related live extended play by Hillsong Live, which was released in May 2012. The EP includes two songs in two different versions, live and studio.

== Track listing ==
Standard edition
No.	Title	Writer(s)	Worship leader	Length
1.	"Endless Light"	Karl Cashwell, Dean Ussher	Jad Gillies	4:18
2.	"Beneath the Waters (I Will Rise)"	Brooke Fraser, Scott Ligertwood	Annie Garratt	5:13
3.	"Cornerstone"	Eric Liljero, Reuben Morgan, Edward Mote, Jonas Myrin	David Ware	6:49
4.	"I Surrender"	Matt Crocker	Matt Crocker	5:46
5.	"Hope of the World"	Matthew Bronleewee, Jason Ingram, Morgan	Reuben Morgan	4:08
6.	"All My Hope"	Ingram, Morgan	Annie Garratt	5:30
7.	"Grace Abounds"	Ben Fielding, Ussher	Dean Ussher	5:02
8.	"Running"	Crocker, Ligertwood	Jonathon Douglass	4:04
9.	"Children of the Light"	Joel Houston	Joel Houston	4:37
10.	"Stand in Awe"	Fielding, Morgan	Ben Fielding	5:55
11.	"Love Knows No End"	Fielding, Morgan, Harrison Wood	David Ware	5:18
12.	"Greater Than All"	Autumn Hardman, Dave Hodgson	Jad Gillies	5:57
13.	"Hope of the World" (studio version; bonus track)	Bronleewee, Ingram, Morgan	Ben Fielding	3:38

Deluxe edition
No.	Title	Writer(s)	Worship leader	Length
13.	"Love So High"	Ingram, Morgan, Matt Redman, Chris Tomlin	Matt Crocker	4:56
14.	"I Desire Jesus"	Ligertwood	Darlene Zschech	6:04
15.	"Praise Him"	Crocker, Nathan Finochio	Matt Crocker	4:37

Digital deluxe edition
No.	Title	Writer(s)	Worship leader	Length
16.	"Hope of the World" (studio version)	Bronleewee, Ingram, Morgan	Ben Fielding	3:38
17.	"Cornerstone" (studio version)	Liljero, Morgan, Mote, Myrin	David Ware	3:26
18.	"Running" (studio version)	Crocker, Ligertwood	Matt Crocker	3:50
19.	"The Grace Zone is a World of Blessing" (Brian Houston message)	Brian Houston		21:37

DVD
No.	Title	Length
1.	"Know Thyself"	02:29
2.	"Running"	04:05
3.	"Endless Light"	04:19
4.	"I Surrender"	10:28
5.	"I Desire Jesus"	06:08
6.	"Grace Abounds"	07:33
7.	"Love Knows No End"	05:19
8.	"Praise Him"	04:33
9.	"Children Of The Light"	04:38
10.	"Hope Of The World"	04:48
11.	"All My Hope"	05:31
12.	"Love So High"	04:52
13.	"Stand In Awe"	06:31
14.	"Greater Than All"	06:03
15.	"Beneath The Waters (I Will Rise)"	06:29
16.	"Cornerstone"	07:38
17.	"Home"	04:34
18.	"Inside Hillsong Creative"	38:49

Note

- "Cornerstone" contains verses from "The Solid Rock" written by Edward Mote.

=== Extended play ===
#	Song	Songwriters	Worship leader	Backing vocal	Length
1	"Cornerstone" (studio version)	Edward Mote, Eric Liljero, Jonas Myrin and Reuben Morgan	Dave Ware		3:26
2	"Hope of the World" (studio version)	Reuben Morgan, Jason Ingram and Matthew Bronleewee	Ben Fielding		3:38
3	"Cornerstone" (live)	Edward Mote, Eric Liljero, Jonas Myrin and Reuben Morgan	Dave Ware	Annie Garratt	6:49
4	"Hope of the World" (live)	Reuben Morgan, Jason Ingram and Matthew Bronleewee	Reuben Morgan	Annie Garratt	4:08

== Personnel ==
- David Andrew – keyboards
- Jay Cook – frontline singer
- Paul Cox – backline technician
- Matt Crocker - worship leader, acoustic guitar, banjo
- Jenny Deacon – frontline singer
- Katie Dodson – frontline singer
- Jonathon Douglass - worship leader
- Ben Fielding - worship leader, acoustic guitar
- Annie Garratt - worship leader
- Jad Gillies - worship leader, acoustic guitar
- Elizabeth Gorringe – French horn
- Autumn Hardman – keyboards
- Nigel Hendroff – electric guitar, acoustic guitar
- Hannah Hobbs – frontline singer
- Lauren Hodges – violin
- Bobbie Houston – senior pastor
- Brian Houston – senior pastor
- Joel Houston - executive producer, worship leader, electric guitar, acoustic guitar
- Peter James – keyboards
- Timon Klein – electric guitar
- Sam Knock – frontline singer
- Simon Kobler – percussion
- Brad Kohring – frontline singer
- Hayley Law – frontline singer
- Eric Liljero – frontline singer
- Jill McCloghry – frontline singer
- Dan McMurray – drums
- Reuben Morgan - executive producer, worship leader, electric guitar, acoustic guitar, worship pastor
- Bob Mpofu – bass guitar
- Sheila Mpofu – frontline singer
- Aaron Polley – keyboards
- Janosh Rauscher (ICF Church Zurich) – frontline singer, percussion (ICF Church Zurich) ("Hope of the World")
- Jarryd Scully – electric guitar
- Celeste Shackleton – cello
- Sloane Simpson – frontline singer
- J.P. Starra – percussion
- Isaac Soon – electric guitar
- Katrina Tadman – frontline singer
- Marcus Temu – frontline singer
- Ben Tennikoff – pump organ, accordion, glockenspiel
- Dylan Thomas – electric guitar ("Beneath the Waters (I Will Rise)")
- Dean Ussher - worship leader, acoustic guitar
- Dave Ware - worship leader
- Marc Warry – trombone
- Ben Whincop – bass guitar
- Harrison Wood – drums
- Darlene Zschech - worship leader

== Singles ==
- "Hope of the World" (2012)

== Formats ==
- Standard CD (12 LIVE Songs, 1 Bonus Track)
- Standard DVD (15 Video Songs, 2 Bonus Features)
- Standard Digital Download (12 LIVE Songs, 1 Bonus Track)
- Standard Blu-ray + DVD + Digital Copy (15 Video Songs, 15 Video Songs HD (Blu-ray), 15 Digital Videos, 2 Bonus Features)
- Australian Special Limited Edition CD + DVD + Digital Copy (15 Video Songs, 15 Digital Videos, 15 LIVE Songs [Special Packing]) [Sold Out]
- Deluxe Edition CD + DVD (15 LIVE Songs, 15 Video Songs, 2 Bonus Features)
- Deluxe Digital (15 LIVE Songs, 3 Studio Songs, 1 Talk)

== Charts and certifications ==
=== Weekly charts ===
Chart (2012)	Peak position
Australian Albums (ARIA)	2
Canadian Albums (Billboard)	64
Dutch Albums (Album Top 100)	52
New Zealand Albums (RMNZ)	24
Norwegian Albums (VG-lista)	15
UK Albums (OCC)	99
UK Christian & Gospel Albums (OCC)	4
UK Independent Albums (OCC)	12
US Billboard 200	32
US Top Christian Albums (Billboard)	1

=== Year-end charts ===
Chart (2012)	Position
Australian Albums (ARIA)	85

=== Certifications ===
Region	Certification	Certified units/sales
Australia (ARIA)	Gold	35,000^{^}
^{^} Shipments figures based on certification alone.
