= Ben Hoyle =

- Born: Benjamin Mark Hoyle; June 21, 1979 (age 45); Ashton-under-Lyne, Manchester, United Kingdom
- Occupation: Pastor
- Spouse: Jenna–marie Hoyle

Benjamin Mark Hoyle (born June 1979 in Ashton-under-Lyne, Manchester, United Kingdom) is a Pentecostal Christian pastor in the Assemblies of God in New Zealand. Hoyle served as that church's national youth director from 2011 – 2016, after serving as youth pastor of Faith City Church in Whanganui, New Zealand, under Iliafi Esera, from 2004 – 2015. Since 2003, BenHoyle has been the director of the New Zealand Youth of the Nation Conference.

== Biography ==
=== Early life ===
Born in Ashton-under-Lyne, Greater Manchester in the UK, on June 21, 1979, Hoyle lived with his parents, elder brother and younger sister in Stockport until his father brought the family to Whanganui, New Zealand, for work, in 1985. During high school, Hoyle became a leader of the ISCF group until leaving school in 1997. He also went on to become a cabin leader and then camp director at Green Pastures Christian Camp. Also during this time, Hoyle made Faith City Church his home church. After returning from a trip to the United Kingdom, in 1998, he met Jenna-marie. They would get married in October 2001.

=== Anondyne years ===
In October 1998, Hoyle became the lead singer of Whanganui rock band Anondyne, stylized "ANODYNe." Anodyne brought Hoyle together with Daryl Warburton (guitar), Joshua Louwrens (drums), and Clayton Kilmister (bass guitar). Anodyne performed from 1998 – 2001, doing performances across New Zealand including Parachute Music festival and SamStock in 2000. The band played its last concert in Whanganui in May 2001.

Anodyne put out a CD EP in January 2000 entitled Subtle.

=== Ministry ===
In April 2003, Hoyle was offered a position on staff at Faith City Church as a youth worker. In 2004, he became the youth director.

Hoyle has stated he has "a passion for unity amongst the body of Christ. Whanganui has a history of church unity, which has opened up opportunities for churches to work together on many occasions." As a member of the Wanganui Christian Youth Workers since 2003, Ben presented the vision to hold a combined city youth conference and in 2004, the Youth of the Nation Conference was born. Hoyle has continued to be the conference director since the first event.

Hoyle also ministers around New Zealand including the Soul Survivor NZ event, Impact Youth Conference, camps and churches. In 2011, Hoyle was made the national youth facilitator for the Assemblies of God in New Zealand; Hoyle became an ordained pastor in 2013. At the conclusion of 2015, Hoyle finished up as the youth pastor at Faith City Church in Whanganui. Christine Waitai-Rapana was appointed to the role at the commencement of 2016.

It was announced that Hoyle would be finishing in the national youth facilitator role for the Assemblies of God in New Zealand at the end of 2016. Jamie and Rebekah Chapman from Connect Church, Timaru will be succeeding Ben as the national youth facilitators.

== Family ==
Ben and Jenna-marie Hoyle live in Whanganui, New Zealand.

Preceded by Shane Meyer	National Youth Facilitator for the Assemblies of God in New Zealand; 2011–2016	Succeeded by Jamie & Rebekah Chapman

Preceded by Daryl Warburton	Youth Pastor of Faith City Church A/G; 2004–2015	Succeeded by Christine Waitai-Rapana
