= Youth of the Nation Conference =

- Genre: Christian
- Locations: Wanganui, New Zealand
- Years active: 2004–2018
- Website: http://www.yotn.net.nz/

Youth of the Nation was an annual Christian Youth Conference held for 15 years in Wanganui, New Zealand. Unlike many other Christian conferences, YOTN was not held by one specific church or denomination. Youth of the Nation conferences and events were hosted by The Youth Of The Nation Trust in collaboration with other churches from around New Zealand. For the first 8 years the conferences were hosted by the Wanganui Christian Youth Workers collective, a group of Christian youth pastors & workers from different denominations & churches across the city of Wanganui. This collective included representatives from Anglican, Apostolic, Assemblies of God, Baptist, Open Brethren, Catholic, Incedo, Presbyterian, Christian Outreach Centre—now known as International Network of Churches—, Elim, Salvation Army, & non-denominational. From 2012 until 2018, the YOTN Trust partnered with churches, not only in Wanganui, but from across New Zealand to host events in different cities.

== Introduction ==
Youth of the Nation (YOTN) aimed to encourage and empower Christian young people to pursue Jesus Christ with a zeal that will impact their generation. As an event, the goal was to provide a 3-4 day event that was affordable for more New Zealand young people.

The vision to hold YOTN came from Wanganui A/G youth pastor, Ben Hoyle. In 2003, Ben approached the local city youth workers to hold the conference as a city. He recognised that for one church to put on such a large event was too much, and that together the city could pull its resources and achieve the goal. With many of the city youth workers on board, plans were made to hold the very first conference in July 2004.

Each year YOTN gained momentum seeing attendance grow and more young people leave excited about their faith.

"YOTN continues to build in its momentum, magnitude and excellence. It is great to see more and more young people coming and leaving radically changed. The greatest thrill for me is seeing the hunger in the younger generation for the reality of God and a deep desire to walk in God's ways. Long may it continue." - Ps Iliafi Esera (Faith City Church A/G, Wanganui)

In 2011, the event moved from the Wanganui Central Baptist Church, where it had been held for 6 years, to the School Hall at Wanganui City College. Then in 2012, YOTN IX was moved to the War Memorial Hall Convention Centre which seats 1500 people, where the conference was held until 2015.

Ben Hoyle resigned as YOTN director in 2018 and Youth of the Nation Trust & events were absorbed into the Fearless Movement of the Assemblies of God NZ under the leadership of Ps Mike Coe from Timaru. YOTN held its final conference in April 2018 at Whanganui Central Baptist Church. The theme for 2018 was 'Possible' and involved reflecting on the past 15 years. Ps Ben Hoyle spoke the final message of conference and Ps Mike Coe closed the conference by announcing the future with Fearless.

== History ==
=== Conferences ===
Starting with Youth of the Nation 2004, the conference has been held annually. The first decade of YOTN Conferences were headlined by guest speakers and guest artists.

Year	Title	Dates	Venue	Featured Speakers	Featured Artists
2004	Youth of the Nation 2004	2–4 July	Faith Community Church	Ps Graeme Brock (The Tribe, Masterton NZ); Timo Tagaloa (Athletes in Action, Auckland NZ); Ps Tim King (Advance Ministry Training College, Auckland NZ)	Wash (Auckland NZ); Rapture Ruckus (Wellington NZ); Colliding Traits (Auckland NZ)
2005	Youth of the Nation 05	8–10 July	Central Baptist Church	Ps John Cairns (Power & Light Ministries, Melbourne AUS); Ps Paul Saunders (Global Task, Auckland NZ); Justin Duckworth (Global Education Centre, Wellington NZ)	Moped (Wellington NZ); Agent'c (Wellington NZ); Assorted Sweets (Wellington NZ)
2006	Youth of the Nation III	30 June - 2 July	Central Baptist Church	Ps Don McDonell (Albany Christian Centre A/G, Auckland NZ); Adrian Bates (Creation Ministries International, Auckland NZ); Ps Daniel Paikea (Teen Challenge NZ, Palmerston North NZ)	Do Or Die (Auckland NZ); Calling Elijah (Auckland NZ); Fallen State (Wanganui NZ)
2007	Youth of the Nation IV	29 June - 1 July	Central Baptist Church	Ps Don McDonell (Albany Christian Centre A/G, Auckland NZ); Ps Neville Bartley (Central Baptist Church, Wanganui NZ); Ps Iliafi Esera (Faith City Church A/G, Wanganui NZ)	Zebulun (Auckland NZ); Arms Reach (Hamilton NZ); Calling Elijah (Auckland NZ)
2008	Youth of the Nation V	16–19 July	Central Baptist Church	Ps Ben Houston (Hillsong Northern Beaches, Sydney AUS); Dave Wells (Bible College of NZ, Auckland NZ); Ps Sam Bayly (Gospel Inc., Wellington NZ)	Outta Exile (Tauranga NZ); Dave Wiggins (Auckland NZ); Zero-T (Gisborne NZ); Tom Watts (Wanganui NZ)
2009	Youth of the Nation 6	9–11 July	Central Baptist Church	Ps Christoph Zintl (South City Christian Church, Christchurch NZ); Ps Sam Bayly (Gospel Inc., Wellington NZ); Ps Levi Marychurch (Arise Church, Wellington NZ); Ps Daniel Paikea (Teen Challenge NZ, Auckland NZ); Ps Shane Meyer (City Church, Tauranga NZ)	E.M.T. (Auckland NZ); Calling Elijah (Auckland NZ); A Kiss Goodbye (Tauranga NZ)
2010	Youth of the Nation VII	8–10 July	Central Baptist Church	Ps John Cairns (John Cairns Ministries, Melbourne AUS); Michael Jones (Former All Black, Auckland NZ); Julia Wright (Christian Broadcaster, Auckland NZ); Ps Kem Price (Kem Price Ministries, Auckland NZ); Ps Levi Marychurch (Arise Church, Wellington NZ)	The Frisk (Auckland NZ); Dave Wiggins (Auckland NZ); Jury & The Saints (Auckland NZ)
2011	Youth of the Nation 8	21–23 July	Wanganui City College	Ps David Katina (Great Life Church, Hawaii USA); Ps Al Furey (Al Furey Ministries, Sydney AUS); Ps Scott Bell (Albany City Church A/G, Auckland NZ); Ps Steve Dunne (Richmond Baptist Church, Nelson NZ); Ps Christoph Zintl (South City Christian Church, Christchurch NZ)	Tokyo Keys (Auckland NZ); Sio Vaelua (Palmerston North NZ); Asher (Auckland NZ)
2012	Youth of the Nation IX	12–14 July	War Memorial Hall	Ps James Williams (Peninsula City Church, Melbourne AUS); Ps Don McDonell (Inspire Church Albany A/G, Auckland NZ); Cindy Ruakere (NorthCity Church, Christchurch NZ); Ps Tim Cleary (C3 Church, Auckland NZ); Ps Daniel Paikea (Teen Challenge NZ, Auckland NZ)	[shift] (Auckland NZ); MADD Messenger (Auckland NZ); Theophilus (Auckland NZ)
2013	Youth of the Nation X	24–27 July	War Memorial Hall	Ps Nick Khiroya (Hillsong Church, Brisbane AUS); Ps John Cairns (John Cairns Ministries, Melbourne AUS); Ps Esther Elliott (Equippers Church Manukau, Auckland NZ); Ps Don McDonell (Inspire Church Albany A/G, Auckland NZ); Ps Graeme Brock (CCC on Pascal, Palmerston North NZ); Ps Steve Dunne (Richmond Baptist Church, Nelson NZ)	Andy Campbell (Worship Pastor, St Paul's Symonds Street, Auckland NZ); Black Boy Peaches (Auckland NZ)

From 2014, YOTN Conferences no longer headlined regular artists, putting more focus on guest speakers and introducing Tribal War games that had been tested at YOTN X with success.

Year	Title	Dates	Venue	Featured Speakers	Extra Notes
2014	Youth of the Nation Plus	17–19 July	War Memorial; Conference Centre	Dr Allan Meyer (Careforce Lifekeys, Melbourne AUS); Ps Luka Robertson (Manukau Hope Centre, Auckland NZ); Ps Daniel Paikea (Paikea Ministries, Gold Coast AUS); Ps Sam Bayly (New Life Churches Youth Director NZ)	#RunWellAotearoa
2015	Youth of the Nation Uproar	9–11 July	War Memorial; Conference Centre	Ps Ted DiBiase (WWE Hall Of Famer, Clinton, MS, USA); Ps Jadwin Gillies (Hillsong United, Sydney AUS); Ps Esther Elliott (Equippers Church, Auckland NZ); Ps Rocky Stocks (Grace Vineyard Church, Christchurch NZ)	#IamtheUproar
2016	Youth of the Nation One	28–30 April	Wanganui Racecourse	Ps Nick Khiroya (Hillsong Church, Brisbane AUS); Ps Steven Silcock (Revolution Church, Christchurch NZ); Ps Daniel Paikea (Paikea Ministries, Gold Coast AUS); Ps Gary Grut (Baptist Churches Youth Team Leader NZ); Ps Gordon Fitch (Presbyterian Churches Youth Manager NZ)	One God; One Body; One Kingdom
2017	Youth of the Nation; Ascend the Hill	27–29 April	Central Baptist Church	Ps Brenden Brown (Hillsong Church, San Francisco USA); Ps Steven Silcock (Revolution Church, Christchurch NZ); Ps Byron Marchant (Equippers Church, Auckland NZ); Ps Gary Grut (Baptist Churches Youth Team Leader NZ)	
2018	Youth of the Nation; Possible	26–28 April	Central Baptist Church	Ps Daniel Paikea (Paikea Ministries, Gold Coast AUS); Ps Steven Silcock (Revolution Church, Christchurch NZ); Ps Christoph Zintl (The Story Vineyard Church, Wellington NZ); Ps Ben Hoyle (YOTN National Director, Whanganui NZ)	F15TEEN YEARS

=== Speakers ===
Youth of the Nation Conference has had speakers from across New Zealand, along with many ministers from Wanganui itself. Here is a list of all those who have spoken, either in main sessions or electives, over the years:

The official poster for the very first Youth of the Nation held in 2004.

Youth of the Nation X was held to celebrate 10 years in 2013.

The final Youth of the Nation conference was held in 2018 and was themed 'Possible'.

Speaker's Name	Organisation/Church	Conferences
Andrew Bailey	Elim Worship Centre (Wanganui NZ)	YOTN X YOTN Ascend the Hill
Kerran Bartley	Central Baptist Church (Wanganui NZ)	YOTN 2004; YOTN 05
Neville Bartley	Scripture Union (Wellington NZ)	YOTN 2004; YOTN III; YOTN IV; YOTN V YOTN VII; YOTN IX; YOTN X YOTN Uproar; YOTN Possible
Asher Bastion	Life FM (Auckland NZ)	YOTN 6
Adrian Bates	Creation Ministries International (Auckland NZ)	YOTN III
Sam Bayly	National New Life Churches Youth Director (Wellington NZ)	YOTN III; YOTN IV; YOTN V YOTN 6 YOTN IX; YOTN Plus
Ivan Beets	Wash (Auckland NZ)	YOTN 2004
Scott Bell	Inspire Church Albany A/G (Auckland NZ)	YOTN 6 YOTN 8 YOTN X
Kirk Beyer	The Rock (Wellington NZ)	YOTN Plus
Graeme Brock	CCC on Pascal (Palmerston North NZ)	YOTN 2004; YOTN X
Brenden Brown	Hillsong Church (San Francisco USA)	YOTN Ascend the Hill
Murray Brown	YouthTrain NZ (Palmerston North NZ)	YOTN 05; YOTN IV
Morgan Burne	Citywestchurch A/G (New Plymouth NZ)	YOTN Plus
Sam Burrows	[shift] (Auckland NZ)	YOTN IX
John Cairns	John Cairns Ministries (Melbourne AUS)	YOTN 05; YOTN VII; YOTN X
Andrew Campbell	St Paul's Symonds Street (Auckland NZ)	YOTN 2004; YOTN X
Lorne Campbell	Christ Church Anglican Parish (Wanganui NZ)	YOTN V
Matthew Chamberlain	National Presbyterian Youth Director (Auckland NZ)	YOTN Uproar
Tim Cleary	C3 (Auckland NZ)	YOTN IX
Mike Coe	Connect Church (Timaru NZ)	YOTN Possible
Matt Collier	City Church A/G (Tauranga NZ)	YOTN III
Patrick Coneglan	Equippers Church (Wanganui NZ)	YOTN III
Brendan Cooper	Faith City Church (Wanganui NZ)	YOTN Possible
Kerryann Cooper	Faith City Church (Wanganui NZ)	YOTN Possible
Paul Cornish	Central Baptist Church (Wanganui NZ)	YOTN IV
Malcolm Delamare	Porirua Christian Life Centre A/G (Porirua NZ)	YOTN 6
Ted DiBiase	WWE Hall of Famer (Mississippi USA)	YOTN Uproar
Andy Dickson	Calling Elijah (Auckland NZ)	YOTN 6
Justin Duckworth	Global Education Centre (Wellington NZ)	YOTN 05
Mick Duncan	The Outsiders (Wanganui NZ)	YOTN Possible
Steve Dunne	Richmond Baptist Church (Nelson NZ)	YOTN 8 YOTN X
David Elliott	World Outreach (Singapore)	YOTN One
Esther Elliott	Equippers Church (Auckland NZ)	YOTN X YOTN Uproar
Penny Elliott	World Outreach (Singapore)	YOTN One
Marty Emmett	YWAM (Tauranga NZ)	YOTN Uproar
Iliafi Esera	Faith City Church A/G (Wanganui NZ)	YOTN III; YOTN IV; YOTN X
Dallas Eves	Ingestre Street Bible Church (Wanganui NZ)	YOTN 05
Gordon Fitch	National Presbyterian Youth Manager (Wellington NZ)	YOTN One
Al Furey	Al Furey Ministries (Sydney AUS)	YOTN 8
Rebecca Gane	Salvation Army HQ (Wellington NZ)	YOTN X
Julia Gaze	Citywestchurch A/G (New Plymouth NZ)	YOTN IV
Jadwin Gillies	Hillsong United (Sydney AUS)	YOTN Uproar
Tania Goose	Riverstones Church A/G (Upper Hutt NZ)	YOTN Plus
Gary Grut	National Baptist Youth Team Leader (Auckland NZ)	YOTN One; YOTN Ascend the Hill
Mike Hadwin	Albany City Church A/G (Auckland NZ)	YOTN 8
Sam Harvey	Soul Survivor NZ (Wellington NZ)	YOTN IV
Beki Hayward	Soul Survivor NZ (Wellington NZ)	YOTN V
Justin Holm	The Base City Church (Wanganui NZ)	YOTN III
Travers Hopkins	Equippers Church (Wanganui NZ)	YOTN VII
Ben Houston	Hillsong Northern Beaches (Sydney AUS)	YOTN V
Ben Hoyle	Faith City Church A/G (Wanganui NZ)	YOTN V YOTN 6 YOTN X YOTN Plus; YOTN Uproar; YOTN One; YOTN Possible
Nigel Irwin	Central Baptist Church (Wanganui NZ)	YOTN One
Aaron Jackson	Actor (Auckland NZ)	YOTN 05; YOTN Possible
David Jones	Citywestchurch A/G (New Plymouth NZ)	YOTN 8
Michael Jones	Former All Black (Auckland NZ)	YOTN VII
Eugene Katene	Te Puna O Wai Ora (Wanganui NZ)	YOTN IV
Kinyua Kathuri	Ingestre Street Bible Church (Wanganui NZ)	YOTN Ascend the Hill
David Katina	Koinonia Christian Center (Hawaii USA)	YOTN 8
Nick Khiroya	Hillsong Church (Brisbane AUS)	YOTN X YOTN One
Tim King	Advance Ministry Training College (Auckland NZ)	YOTN 2004
Abby Kingi	Faith City Church A/G (Wanganui NZ)	YOTN 8
Caleb Kingi	Cliff Life Church A/G (Wanganui NZ)	YOTN 8 YOTN One
Nick Kirk	Christ Church Anglican (Wanganui NZ)	YOTN 6
David Mann	Hope Project (Tauranga NZ)	YOTN Ascend the Hill
Byron Marchant	Equippers Church (Auckland NZ)	YOTN Ascend the Hill
Tawhe Mark	Christian Outreach Centre (Wanganui NZ)	YOTN 05; YOTN 6
Levi Marychurch	Arise Church (Wellington NZ)	YOTN 6 YOTN VII
Braden Matson	Harvest Christian Church A/G (Auckland NZ)	YOTN IV; YOTN V
Don McDonell	Inspire Church Albany A/G (Auckland NZ)	YOTN III; YOTN IV; YOTN IX; YOTN X
Jacob McGregor	Faith City Church A/G (Wanganui NZ)	YOTN Plus
Karina McGregor	Faith City Church A/G (Wanganui NZ)	YOTN One
Chris McKenzie	St Andrew's Presbyterian Church (Wanganui NZ)	YOTN IV; YOTN IX; YOTN X YOTN Ascend the Hill
Andrew McKerrow	Salvation Army (Wanganui NZ)	YOTN VII
Allan Meyer	Careforce Lifekeys (Melbourne AUS)	YOTN Plus
Shane Meyer	City Church A/G (Tauranga NZ)	YOTN 6
Mo Morgan	St James' Presbyterian Church (Wanganui NZ)	YOTN One
Ray Moxham	Freedom Christian Church A/G (Hamilton NZ)	YOTN Plus
Rachel O'Connor	Youth For Christ (Wellington NZ)	YOTN III
Daniel Paikea	Paikea Ministries (Gold Coast AUS)	YOTN III; YOTN V YOTN 6 YOTN 8 YOTN IX; YOTN X YOTN Plus; YOTN Uproar; YOTN One; YOTN Ascend the Hill; YOTN Possible
Whetu Pohio	Turning Point Church (Napier NZ)	YOTN IX
Joshua Pound	Central Baptist Church (Wanganui NZ)	YOTN Ascend the Hill; YOTN Possible
Kem Price	Kem Price Ministries (Auckland NZ)	YOTN VII
Rosanne Rea	Ingestre Street Bible Church (Wanganui NZ)	YOTN 8
Teina Rima	Good News Emanuel Faith Fellowship A/G (Auckland NZ)	YOTN Plus
Luka Robertson	Manukau Hope Centre (Auckland NZ)	YOTN Plus
Scott Rosene	Youth For Christ (Wanganui NZ)	YOTN 05; YOTN III; YOTN IV
Glen Rowe	Colliding Traits (Auckland NZ)	YOTN 2004
James Roy	Equippers Church (Wanganui NZ)	YOTN X YOTN One
Cindy Ruakere	Northcity Church (Christchurch NZ)	YOTN IX
Paul Saunders	Global Task (Auckland NZ)	YOTN 05
Vivian Schwartfeger	Why Ministries (Wanganui NZ)	YOTN 05; YOTN VII
Steven Silcock	Revolution Church (Christchurch NZ)	YOTN One; YOTN Ascend the Hill; YOTN Possible
Kent Somerville	SALT Church (Palmerston North NZ)	YOTN VII
Andrew Stanbrook-Mason	Faith City Church A/G (Wanganui NZ)	YOTN 2004; YOTN V
Rocky Stocks	Grace Vineyard Church (Christchurch NZ)	YOTN Uproar
Timo Tagaloa	Athletes in Action (Auckland NZ)	YOTN 2004
Iliesa Tamaniyaga	City Ministers Association (Wanganui NZ)	YOTN V
Rob Thompson	Central Baptist Church (Wanganui NZ)	YOTN V
Greg Tichbon	Youth For Christ (Wanganui NZ)	YOTN 2004
Sean du Toit	Alphacrucis (Auckland NZ)	YOTN IX
Lyndon Tongs	Christian Family A/G (Palmerston North NZ)	YOTN III
Selepa Vai	Te Awamutu A/G (Te Awamutu NZ)	YOTN Uproar
Jordan Vailima	Life City Church (Wainuiomata NZ)	YOTN Possible
Christine Waitai-Rapana	Faith City Church (Wanganui NZ)	YOTN Ascend the Hill
Daryl Warburton	Waitara High School (Waitara NZ)	YOTN Possible
Dave Wells	Bible College Of NZ (Auckland NZ)	YOTN V
Stephanie West	The Base City Church (Wanganui NZ)	YOTN 2004
Paul White	Levin A/G (Levin NZ)	YOTN VII; YOTN 8 YOTN Possible
Dave Wiggins	Comedian (Auckland NZ)	YOTN V YOTN VII
Annette Williams	St Andrew's Presbyterian Church (Wanganui NZ)	YOTN 2004; YOTN 05
James Williams	Peninsula City Church (Melbourne AUS)	YOTN IX
Simon Williams	St Andrew's Presbyterian Church (Wanganui NZ)	YOTN 2004; YOTN 05
Petia Wilson	MADD Messenger (Auckland NZ)	YOTN IX
Melody Winters	Incedo (Wanganui NZ)	YOTN VII
Julia Wright	Christian Broadcaster (Auckland NZ)	YOTN VII
Christoph Zintl	The Story Vineyard Church (Wellington NZ)	YOTN 6 YOTN 8 YOTN Possible

== Youth of the Nation: Preliminary event ==
YOTN held a special preliminary event, held in Term One of the school year. It served to bring youth groups and ministries together in cities around the nation. It also gave young people a taste of what the actual conference held later in the year would be like.

Year	Title	Date	Venue	Speaker	Notes
2006	YOTN; InFocus	11 March	Faith City Church A/G, Wanganui	Ps John Cairns (Power & Light Ministries, Melbourne AUS)	Wanganui band Fallen State performed
2007	YOTN IV; InFocus	15 February	Faith City Church A/G, Wanganui	Ps Don McDonell (Albany Christian Centre A/G, Auckland)	This was the first full meeting Ps Don ministered at following his quad-bike accident in Nov 2006
2008	YOTN V InFocus	22 February	Christ Church Anglican, Wanganui	Ps John Cairns (John Cairns Ministries, Melbourne AUS)	
2009	YOTN6; InFocus	5 March; 6 March	St Andrews Presbyterian, Wanganui; Life City Church A/G, Wainuiomata	Ps Daniel Paikea (Teen Challenge NZ, Auckland)	The first InFocus held outside of Wanganui was held in Wellington.
2010	YOTN VII; InFocus	6 March; 24 April	Salt Church A/G, Palmerston North; Life City Church A/G, Wainuiomata	Ps Scott Bell (Albany City Church A/G, Auckland); Ps Christoph Zintl (South City Christian Church, Christchurch); Ps Levi Marychurch (Arise Church, Wellington)	The first InFocus held in the Palmerston North. These were whole day events.
2011	YOTN8; InFocus	25 February; 26 February	Equippers Church, Wanganui; Hutt City Baptist Church, Lower Hutt	Ps Braden Matson (Chiesa Evangelica Bethel, Bari Italy)	
2012	YOTN IX; Tour	18 March; 20 March; 21 March; 22 March; 23 March; 24 March	Living Waters Christian Church, Auckland; City Rock Church, Napier; Faith City Church A/G, Wanganui; Hutt City New Life Church, Wellington; Richmond Baptist Church, Nelson; South City Christian Centre, Christchurch	Ps James Williams (Peninsula City Church, Melbourne AUS)	InFocus was renamed Tour and YOTN held events in multiple cities.
2013	YOTN X Tour	5 April; 6 April; 7 April; 8 April; 9 April; 10 April; 11 April; 12 April; 13 April; 14 April	Nations Church, Dunedin; Aranui Primary School, Christchurch; Richmond Baptist Church, Nelson; The Rock Church, Wellington; The Miracle Centre, Hastings; St Andrews Presbyterian, Wanganui citywestchurch A/G, New Plymouth; South Waikato Events Centre, Tokoroa; Otara Recreation Centre, South Auckland; Inspire Church Albany, Albany Auckland	Ps Daniel Paikea (Gold Coast Chapel, Gold Coast AUS)	Celebrating 10 Years in 10 Cities over 10 Days.
2014	YOTN Plus; Tour	27 March; 28 March; 29 March; 30 March; 31 March; 1 April; 2 April	Nations Church, Dunedin; City East Church, Christchurch; Faith City Church, Auckland; Inspire Church, Taupō; Equippers Church, Wanganui; The Miracle Centre, Hastings; The Rock Church, Wellington	Ps Christoph Zintl (Grace Vineyard Church, Christchurch)	'Run Well Aotearoa'
2015	YOTN Uproar; Tour	20 March; 21 March; 22 March; 24 March; 25 March; 26 March; 27 March; 28 March	Freedom Christian Church, Hamilton; Mt Zion A/G Manurewa, Auckland; Inspire Church, Taupō; Elim Worship Centre, Wanganui; Equippers Church, Masterton; Kings House Church, Napier; Hutt City Baptist Church, Wellington; Nations Church, Dunedin	Ps Esther Elliott (Equippers Church, Auckland); Ps Kirk Beyer (The Rock Church, Wellington); Ps Ben Hoyle (YOTN Director, Wanganui)	#IamtheUproar
2016	YOTN One; InFocus	11–12 March	Hutt City Church A/G, Wellington	Ps Ben Hoyle (YOTN Director, Wanganui); Ps Christoph Zintl (The Story Vineyard Church, Wellington); Ps Gordon Fitch (Presbyterian Churches Youth Manager NZ, Wellington)	Due to the change of Conference dates to April, the Tour was put on hold and replaced with this InFocus event.
2017	YOTN ATH; Tour	24 March; 31 March	Ormiston Senior College, Auckland; Hutt City Church A/G, Wellington	Ps Steven Silcock (Revolution Church, Christchurch); Ps Byron Marchant (Equippers Church, Auckland)	Steven spoke at the Auckland event, and Byron spoke in Wellington.
2018	YOTN; Auckland; Possible	14 April	Ormiston Senior College, Auckland	Ps Teina Rima (E12 Youth Ministries, Auckland)	

== Youth of the Nation: Leadership Event ==
Following the 10th Anniversary Conference in 2013, YOTN launched a leadership development event held in the later part of the year. "The Aim is to bring youth pastors, leaders and workers together from across Aotearoa to be encouraged, empowered and equipped."

Year	Title	Date	Venue	Speaker	Notes
2013	YOTN Leaders Plus	16 November	The Rock Church, Wellington	Ps Luka Robertson (Manukau Hope Centre, Auckland NZ)	
2014	YOTN Leaders Uproar	10–11 October	Faith City Church, Wanganui	Ps Iliafi Esera (Superintendent AOG NZ); Ps James Roy (Equippers Church, Wanganui); Kirk Beyer (The Rock, Wellington); Melissa Beyer (The Rock, Wellington); Ps Ben Hoyle (YOTN Director NZ)	
2015	YOTN Leaders One	2–3 October	Faith City Church, Wanganui	Ps Sam Monk (Equippers Church, Auckland); Ps Mike Coe (Connect Church, Timaru)	
2016	YOTN Ascend the Hill; Leaders Conference	30 September - 1 October	The Rock Church, Wellington	Ps Sy Rogers (Life Church, Auckland)	
2017	YOTN Fathers of the Faith; Leaders Conference	10–11 November	The Rock Church, Wellington	Ps Iliafi Esera (Faith City Church, Whanganui); Ps Kem Price (Kem Price Ministries, Auckland)	

== YOTN Championship ==
In 2008, the conference added a sports extension. The YOTN Championship is a sports tournament where different churches/youth groups attending the conference entered teams to compete for the YOTN Championship Trophy. It is a fun competitive event.

Year	Conference	Venue	Winners	Runners-up
2008	YOTN V	Wanganui City College Gymnasium	St Paul's Presbyterian Church (Wanganui)	Faith City Church A/G (Wanganui)
2009	YOTN6	Wanganui City College Gymnasium	Levin A/G (Levin)	YOTN6 Worship Team (Wanganui)
2010	YOTN VII	Wanganui City College Gymnasium	Faith City Church A/G (Wanganui)	Levin A/G (Levin)
2011	YOTN8	Wanganui City College Gymnasium	Living Waters Church (Auckland)	Levin A/G (Levin)
2012	YOTN IX	Wanganui Collegiate Gymnasium	Faith City Church A/G (Wanganui)	Levin Life Church (Levin)
2013	YOTN X	Springvale Stadium	Turning Point Church (Napier)	Good News Emmanuel Faith Fellowship (Auckland)
2014	YOTN Plus	Springvale Stadium	Faith City Church A/G (Wanganui)	Hutt City Church A/G (Lower Hutt)
2015	YOTN Uproar	Springvale Stadium	Hutt City Church A/G (Lower Hutt)	CliffLife Church (Wanganui)
2016	YOTN One	Springvale Stadium	Hutt City Church A/G (Lower Hutt)	Porirua Christian Life Centre (Porirua)
2017	YOTN Ascend the Hill	Jubilee Stadium	Faith City Church A/G (Wanganui)	Life Changers Church (Levin)
2018	YOTN Possible	Whanganui High School Gymnasium	Good News Emanuel Faith Fellowship (Auckland)	Faith City Church A/G (Wanganui)
