= Neville Johnson =

UK born New Zealand Pentecostal pastor

Neville Johnson was a UK born New Zealand Pentecostal pastor who ran the Living Word Foundation from Australia. He died on September 1, 2019.

== Early years ==
Johnson was born in Sunderland, England. He was converted in the Pentecostal church Hebron Tabernacle in Sunderland at 12 years old and felt a call to ministry at the age of 14. His family moved to New Zealand while he was still a child.

== Career ==
From 1968 until December 1970, Johnson and his wife Jo served as missionaries in New Caledonia. They then returned to New Zealand taking over the leadership of the Auckland Assembly, a church which had entered a period of significant growth. The church moved several times, eventually settling in the Auckland Town Hall and became known as the Queen Street Assembly of God. During this time the media began to show some attention to what was happening in the AoG, and Johnson did the first radio interview on commercial radio by an AoG pastor on 1ZB. He spoke on divine healing.

During this time mission work with the Queen St Assembly as a base grew and a Bible College began, the Zion Bible Training Centre. This was a period of change in the Assemblies; Frank Houston resigned as Superintendent in 1977 and soon after Jim Williams was elected in his place.

A tape library was set up (the "Living Word Foundation" later changed to "Life Living Ministries"), based out of the Queen St Assembly, whereby all New Zealanders had access to Johnson's and other international teachers sermons.

Johnson would regularly visit Perth, mainly to a small Pentecostal group "City Chapel" who met in a Methodist church in Raglan Street, North Perth. Later in his ministry, he and his wife moved to Perth and started a church in a Perth hotel (The Kings Ambassador hotel on Hay Street).

Johnson eventually moved to Queensland, with his wife and family. Johnson then ran The Academy of Light together with his wife and son. It is "an End time Training facility" whose purpose is to use internet and satellite transmissions "to train and prepare Christians and non Christians for the end times.
