= Associated Pentecostal Churches of New Zealand =

Fellowship of churches in New Zealand

The Associated Pentecostal Churches of New Zealand is a fellowship of Pentecostal bodies in New Zealand founded in 1975. Members are:

- Pentecostal Church of New Zealand (Elim Pentecostal Church),
- Assemblies of God in New Zealand,
- New Life Churches, New Zealand
