= Endless Light =

Endless Light may refer to:

- Endless Light (Anaghra Raocha) Zoroastrian calendar
- Endless Light album by O'Brother
- "Endless Light", song from Cornerstone (Hillsong Worship album)
- "Endless Light", song by Decoded Feedback
