= Nkechi Anayo-Iloputaife =

Nigerian charismatic leader, pastor and televangelist

Apostle Nkechi Francis Anayo-Iloputaife
- Title: General Overseer of Victory Christian Church (1995 - present)
- Spouse: Bishop Harford Anayo Iloputaife (died 1995)

Nkechi Francis Anayo-Iloputaife is a Nigerian charismatic leader, pastor and televangelist. In 1985, along with her husband, she co-founded Victory Christian Church. She remained one of the leaders of the church until the assassination of her husband, who was the overall head of the church. After his death in 1995, she assumed his previous role, overseeing the entire activities in the church. She is also credited to be involved in humanitarian and philanthropic activities. Modern Ghana likened her management of the church affairs to her having the "leadership spirit of a man". In 2014, Nation described her governance and coordination of the church as evidence that "what a man can do, a woman can also do, even better at times".

== Biography ==
Prior to meeting her husband, Nkechi had a catholic Christian background. She was married to Harford Anayo Iloputaife until his assassination in February 1995, a case that still remained unsolved. She had alleged that government may had some input in the event that led to his demise, due to his strong position on the leadership of Nigeria at the time. She regards her deceased husband as her mentor, describing him as "closest representation of Christ likeness in human form" in an interview with Daily Sun. Since his death, Nkechi has been the leading figure of the church, which she attested to her husband announcing her as a "co-visioner" in 1985. Being questioned by Daily Independent on how she has been able to lead men in her church, Nkechi explained that she "...relates with them as a mother and their spiritual leader". Speaking on her fashion sense, Nkechi explained that the meaning of her name is "style and elegance", while describing her trendy looks as being "simplistic and elegant". On whether she hopes to remarry, the energetic preacher told Daily Independent in a different interview that "No, marriage is not in my agenda at all, it’s over, I’m done with marriage, I’m married to Jesus. I’m just asking for more grace for all the things He has put in my hand to do and I have asked him to keep me strong so that I can finish well." She has been involved with donation of materials to educational institutions and other charitable endeavors.
