= Jim Williams (pastor) =

New Zealand pastor

S. Jim Williams

9th General Superintendent of the Assemblies of God in New Zealand
- In office October 1977 – 1985
- Preceded by: Frank Houston
- Succeeded by: Wayne Hughes

Sidney James Williams (11 September 1935 – 18 July 2015) was a pastor and leader of one of the most influential churches in the Assemblies of God in New Zealand. He was a published author and a General Superintendent of the NZ Assembly of God.

== Early ministry ==
Williams received his training at a Bible College in Tauranga. In 1972 he moved with his wife Betty to become pastor of the Hamilton Assembly of God. During his ministry there his influence extended outside his local church through a series of conferences on church growth that attracted many from other Pentecostal denominations as well. In 1975 he became a member of the executive of the NZ AoG.

== Leadership and influence ==
In 1979 Williams followed Frank Houston as General Superintendent of the NZ AoG. He proved a dynamic leader, gaining popularity as a speaker with his regular programme on the newly formed Radio Rhema. As Carew notes this "lifted the Assemblies of God’s profile considerably".

The denomination as a whole was experiencing new growth:

As people continued to migrate from the mainline denominations, secular media became more aware of Pentecostal growth. Newspaper reports noted increasing numbers of adherents, striking new buildings, high levels of financial giving, and the upbeat services and theological certainty offered by these churches. They also highlighted the youthfulness, ethnic diversity, and large numbers of unemployed amongst Pentecostal adherents.

Williams became a published author with a work based on the book of Proverbs called Wisdom - the missing link a book on handling pastoral problems.

One of the most difficult things he had to manage as General Superintendent was the fallout following the revelation of the financial and moral failure of Neville Johnson then pastor of the largest church in Australasia, the Queen Street Assembly of God.

== Departure from New Zealand ==
Williams left for Australia in March 1989, the leadership of the AoG then passing to Pastor Wayne Hughes. In Australia Williams served in what was then known as the Garden City Church in Brisbane.

In October 1993 the Executive of the NZ AoG received a letter from the Australian Assemblies stating that Williams had been guilty of adultery while pastor at the Hamilton Assembly. Williams was replaced as Pastor of the Garden City Christian Church by his deputy Senior Pastor, Pastor Geoff Holdway. Holdway differed from Williams charismatic style by focusing on a more fundamental adherence and teaching of scripture. This was based on his background in the baptist theological seminary with a much more Pentecostal emphasis on scriptural interpretation.

At this time Williams was pastoring in Australia. He lost his Australian credentials, but these were eventually returned after a time of counseling. However he remained barred from ministry in the NZ AoG due to a failure to make any efforts to put the matter right in New Zealand.

In 2000 it became apparent that the extent of his sexual impropriety was much greater than admitted to the Australian body. His credentials in New Zealand were permanently revoked for "adulterous offences and other indiscretions involving different women over an extended period of years".

Following this the Hamilton Assembly (Gateway Christian Centre) left the denomination.

Late in life Williams was no longer associated with the Assemblies of God in Australia, and was pastoring a church The House of Praise in Springwood, Brisbane, Queensland.

| Preceded by Frank Houston | General Superintendent of the Assemblies of God in New Zealand; 1977–1985 | Succeeded by Wayne Hughes |
