= Conversion Practices Prohibition Legislation Act 2022 =

Act of Parliament in New Zealand

New Zealand Parliament
- Royal assent: 18 February 2022
- Commenced: 19 February 2022

Legislative history
- Bill title: Conversion Practices Prohibition Legislation Bill
- Introduced by: Kris Faafoi
- Introduced: 30 July 2021
- Committee responsible: Justice Committee
- First reading: 5 August 2021
- Voting summary: 87 voted for; 33 voted against
- Second reading: 8 February 2022
- Voting summary: 113 voted for; 7 voted against
- Third reading: 15 February 2022
- Voting summary: 112 voted for; 8 voted against

Related legislation
- Human Rights Act 1993
- Status: Current legislation

The Conversion Practices Prohibition Legislation Act 2022 is an Act of Parliament in New Zealand that bans conversion therapy practices that seek to change or suppress a person's sexual orientation, gender identity, or gender expression. The Bill passed its third and final reading on 15 February, receiving royal assent on 18 February 2022.

== Legislative features ==
=== Definitions ===
The Conversion Practices Prohibition Legislation Bill defines conversion practice as a practice that is directed "towards a person because of their sexual orientation, gender identity, or gender expression;" and is "performed with the intention of changing or suppressing the individual's sexual orientation, gender identity, or gender expression."

Clause Five of the Bill states that conversion practice does not include:

- any action that a health practitioner takes when providing a health service if they consider based on their "reasonable" professional judgement that it is appropriate to take action and that they comply with all legal, professional, and ethical standards when taking the action;
- assisting an individual who is undergoing, or considering undergoing, a gender transition;
- assisting an individual to express their gender identity;
- providing acceptance, support, or understanding of an individual;
- facilitating an individual's coping skills, development, or identity exploration, or facilitating social support for the individual; and
- the expression of a belief or a religious principle made to an individual that is not intended to change or suppress the individual's sexual orientation, gender identity, or gender expression.

The Bill defines several examples of conversion practices; namely:

- using shame or coercion intending to give an individual an aversion to same-sex attractions or to encourage gender-conforming behaviour;
- encouraging an individual to believe that their sexual orientation, gender identity, or gender expression needs changing because it is a defect or disorder:
- carrying out a prayer-based practice, a deliverance practice, or an exorcism intending to change or suppress an individual's sexual orientation, gender identity, or gender expression.

=== Offences and legal redress ===
The Bill introduces two new offences:

- Clause 8 makes it an offence for a person, knowingly or recklessly, to perform conversion practice on a person under the age of 18 years or lacking decision-making capacity. Offenders face a term of imprisonment not exceeding three years.
- Clause 9 makes it an offence for a person, knowingly or recklessly, to perform conversion practice that causes serious harm to the individual. Offenders face a term of imprisonment not exceeding five years.

The Bill's Clause 10 states that it is not a defence to the offences outlined in Clauses 8 and 9 that the individual on whom the conversion practice was performed consented to that practice, or that the person charged believed that such consent was given. The criminal offence provisions of the law come into effect when it receives royal assent.

Clause 12 states that no prosecution for any offence under Clauses 8 or 9 can be carried out without the approval of the Attorney General.

Clause 13 allows for civil redress where a person files a complaint under the Human Rights Act 1993. Complainants can seek legal redress about conversion practices through the Human Rights Commission and the Human Rights Review Tribunal, which is expected to launch in August 2022. The civil provisions relating to these two bodies will come into force six months after receiving Royal Assent.

=== Amendments ===
The Bill amends the Human Rights Act 1993 to insert Section 63A which makes it unlawful to perform a conversion practice on any person or to arrange for a conversion practice to be performed on any person.

== History ==
=== Background ===
In August 2018, Minister of Justice Andrew Little proposed that a conversion therapy ban could be considered as part of a reform to the Human Rights Act 1993. After this plan was voted down by coalition partners New Zealand First, the governing Labour Party announced in October 2020 it would definitively ban the practise if re-elected.

=== First reading ===
On 30 July 2021, Minister of Justice and Labour Member of Parliament (MP) Kris Faafoi introduced the proposed Conversion Practices Prohibition Legislation Bill into the New Zealand Parliament.

On 5 August 2021, the Bill received its first reading in Parliament. The Labour, Green, ACT, and Māori parties supported the bill, but the National Party opposed it on the grounds that it lacked provisions protecting parents from prosecution. National had previously supported banning conversion therapy. In April 2021, party leader Judith Collins had pledged National's support for the ban after consulting the party's youth wing Young Nats and googling conversion therapy.

Supporters of the Bill including Faafoi, Green MP Chlöe Swarbrick, Associate Health Minister Dr. Ayesha Verrall, Labour MP Marja Lubeck, Green MP Elizabeth Kerekere, Labour MP Glen Bennett, and Labour MP Shanan Halbert described conversion therapy as pseudoscientific and harmful towards the LGBT community. Māori Party co-leader Rawiri Waititi claimed that conversion therapy was associated with European colonisation and ideas about gender and sexuality that were alien to Māori people. While supporting the goals of the legislation in addressing harm towards LGBTQI communities, ACT MP Nicole McKee expressed concerns that the law would also penalise parents and religious communities.

Opponents of the Bill including National's justice spokesperson Simon Bridges, Chris Penk, and Barbara Kuriger supported the intentions of the legislation but expressed concerns about penalising parents and its allegedly vague language. Bridges also claimed that several young people overseas including Keira Bell expressed regret about transitioning genders. The Bill passed its first reading on 5 August by a margin of 87 to 33 votes, and proceeded to the Justice select committee.

=== Select committee ===
After passing its first reading, the bill was referred to the Justice Select Committee. Public submissions on the bill closed on 8 September 2021 with the committee due to report back to the House by 5 September 2021.

On 14 September 2021, the select committee announced it has received 106,700 written submissions on the bill, breaking the previous record of 39,159 written submissions received on the End of Life Choice Bill. Around 38,900 submissions were unique, with the remaining 68,100 being form submissions.

On 2 February, the Justice select committee released its report on the Conversion Practices Prohibition Legislation Bill. While the bill largely remained unchanged, the committee made recommendations which clarified the bill's wording and added examples of type of actions that constituted conversion therapy into the legislation. The committee's chair Ginny Andersen also sought to allay the concerns of opponents that the bill would penalise parents for having conversations with their children about sexuality and gender. While the National Party abandoned its plans to bloc-vote on the bill and allow conscience voting, the ACT Party objected to the bill in its submission, claiming that parents could be prosecuted for not supporting puberty blockers. The Labour, Greens and Māori parties maintained their support for the legislation. The select committee also heard 837 oral submissions including 716 individuals and 121 organisations.

=== Second reading ===
On 8 February 2022, the Conversion Practices Prohibition Legislation Bill passed its second reading by a margin of 113 to seven votes. The Labour, Green, ACT and Māori parties bloc voted for the bill, alongside 26 National Party MPs who exercised their conscience votes. Seven National MPs Simon Bridges, Simeon Brown, Melissa Lee, Simon O'Connor, Shane Reti, Louise Upston and Michael Woodhouse voted against the bill, also exercising their conscience votes.

=== Third reading ===
On 15 February, the Bill passed its third and final reading by a margin of 112 to eight votes. The Labour, Green, Act and Māori parties bloc voted for the bill, alongside 25 National MPs who exercised their conscience votes. Eight National MPs, Simon Bridges, Simeon Brown, Melissa Lee, Todd McClay, Simon O'Connor, Chris Penk, Michael Woodhouse and Shane Reti, voted against the bill, also exercising their conscience votes.

While none of the Bill's opponents spoke during the final reading, several supporters gave speeches supporting the legislation. The bill's sponsor Faafoi argued that it did not criminalise religious expressions of faith and "open and respectful conversations." Fellow Labour MP Kiri Allan shared about her experience with conversion therapy as a teenager. The Green Party's rainbow spokesperson Elizabeth Kerekere stated that the bill recognised the "decades of trauma" experienced by rainbow communities as well as their "right to exist free from torture, coercion and suppression." National MP Paul Goldsmith opined that the final version of the bill addressed his concerns about the definition of conversion practices and would protect future generations of young people from some of the "terrible practices" that earlier members faced. ACT Deputy Leader Brooke Van Velden stated that the bill would ensure that people for living the lives they wanted to live and for being themselves.

=== Implementation ===
In late May 2023, The Spinoff reported that no legal action had been taken under the criminal and civil provisions of the Conversion Practices Prohibition Legislation Act. New Zealand Police detective inspector Warren Olsson confirmed that Police had not received any complaints nor launch any investigations under the provisions of the Act. Meanwhile, the Human Rights Commission confirmed that it had received 33 inquiries relating to conversion therapy but that none of them had been escalated into the civil redress pathway.

== Responses ==
=== Support ===
The Salvation Army's Territorial Governance Board for New Zealand, Fiji, Tonga and Samoa has opposed a range of conversion therapy practices including prayers on the basis that these constitute "vilification or discrimination on the grounds of sexuality and gender." In addition, the Salvation Army's submitters Ian Gainsford and Ian Hutson argued that the bill did not infringe on freedom of religion but suggested adding a clause to distinguish between pushing someone towards conversion therapy and having a respectful conversation.

In late July 2021, the Green Party of Aotearoa New Zealand, a confidence and supply partner of the incumbent Labour Party, welcomed Faafoi's Conversion Practices Prohibition Legislation Bill. The party's Rainbow Communities spokesperson Dr. Elizabeth Kerekere praised the Government for listening to the rainbow community's pleas that conversion therapy was a crime. Kerekere claimed that a majority supported banning conversion therapy, citing a 156,764-strong petition sponsored by the Greens calling for the practice to be banned.

Victoria University of Wellington law academic Dr. Eddie Clark defended the bill, arguing that exempting parents from prosecution would defeat the purpose of the bill to address the harm caused by conversion therapy to LGBT individuals. Clark also asserted that the bill did not target religious beliefs about LGBTQ people but rather "harmful" religious conversion therapy practices.

Shaneel Lal, co-founder of the Conversion Therapy Action Group, welcomed the proposed Conversion Practices Prohibition Legislation bill but expressed concern that it would neither help survivors or allow offenders to be persecuted. Lal disagreed with the National Party's assertion that the bill would criminalise parents for advising their children against taking puberty blockers; arguing instead that the bill banned parents from forcibly stopping their children from taking puberty blockers with the intention of suppressing their chosen gender identity or expression. Lal disagreed with the bill giving the Attorney-General the sole discretion to prosecute cases of conversion therapy, claiming that it could be use by anti-LGBT forces to deny the rights of LGBT peoples. On 15 February, Lal welcomed the bill's passage into law but criticised the bill for not adequately addressing financial redress for victims and not including individuals under the age of 18 in Section 8.

Several supporters of the conversion therapy ban legislation including VUW Rainbow Law Students Society submitters Clair and Natalie have called for clarity around the law's words suppress, change and intention in order to eliminate loopholes allowing "abusers" to escape. The Young Nats have called for clarity around the term "suppression" in order to address concerns about parents being prosecuted for conversion therapy. The National Collective of Independent Women's Refuges submitters Natalie Thorburn and Cleo Arathoon have argued intention should not be included at all in order to prevent "abusers" from escaping prosecution. Lal has also advocated amending Section 8 of the bill to enable all complainants (not just those over the age of 17) to not have to prove serious harm. They also initiated a petition calling for stronger legislative measures against conversion therapy.

Following the passage of the legislation into law, Chief Human Rights Commissioner Paul Hunt stated that the bill sent "an unequivocal message that conversion practices, which have destructive and sometimes fatal consequences, have no place in this country". He also confirmed that the Human Rights Commission would establish a conversion practices response services team over the next six months. The Human Rights Commission will also provide education about conversion practices and help survivors access the support they need.

=== Opposition ===
The conservative Christian advocacy group Family First New Zealand claimed that a ban on conversion therapy would criminalise parents wanting to protect their child from the "physical, emotional, and psychological harm" caused by gender dysphoria. Family First also objected to a five-year prison term for parents for affirming gender identities that correspond to their children's biological sexes. The group also claimed that the Government "wanted to criminalise the discussion and practice of alternatives to hormones, surgery and confusion."

The left-wing blogger Martyn Bradbury criticised the proposed Conversion Practices Prohibition Legislation bill's five-year prison term as form of "government overreach" which distracted from the Government's failure to address what he regarded as their failed mental health, poverty and housing policies.

Dr. Stuart Lange of the New Zealand Christian Network criticised the proposed bill, claiming that it denied people the freedom to seek and receive what support they desired, discriminated against people unsure about changing their sex or identity away from their biological sex, and compromised religious freedom. He proposed that the legislation include a clause protecting discussions, advice, guidance or prayer regarding sexuality and gender by parents, family members, friends, counsellors, religious leaders, or health professionals when such advice was "respectful and non-coercive." He also expressed concerns that the bill did not distinguish between "harmful practices" and open ended counselling.

The Pentecostal denomination Arise Church supported the Bill's intents at banning harmful practices but expressed concern that it criminalised parents, counselors and pastors seeking to help children and young people dealing with sexuality or gender issues if the intention even with the consent of the individual.

Tony Bracefield, a submitter representing Sunshine Christian Preschool and Redeemer Grace Presbyterian Church, expressed concerned that the proposed law's consent clause would clash with the freedoms to ask for advice and to freely give advice, which he argued was protected by the New Zealand Bill of Rights Act 1990.

=== National Party internal debate ===
The center-right National Party's parliamentary caucus opposition to the Bill was criticised by Young Nats President Stephanie-Anne Ross. The Young Nats have supported a ban on conversion therapy and stated that differences should be resolved at the select committee level. In late August 2021, National MP Chris Bishop was stripped of his Shadow Leader of the House role by party leader Judith Collins officially so that he could focus on his COVID-19 response spokesperson role. However, The New Zealand Herald and Stuff journalists Thomas Coughlan and Henry Cooke claimed that this demotion was the result of Bishop's disagreement with the Party's stance on banning conversion therapy and for advocating a conscience vote on the bill. On 30 August, Collins denied losing her temper at Bishop and fellow National MP Erica Stanford for publicly suggesting that they disagreed with the Party's stance on the legislation.

On 3 February, new National Party leader Christopher Luxon confirmed that National MPs would be allowed a conscience vote on the Conversion Practices Prohibition Legislation Bill. Luxon also expressed his support for the legislation and the LGBTQI+ community in New Zealand. He also stated that "there will be those with different views for different reasons across Parliament. These sorts of issues are traditionally treated as conscience issues, and we determined as a caucus that this was the appropriate course in this instance."
