= Wayne Hughes (pastor) =

New Zealand evangelical leader

R Wayne Hughes

10th General Superintendent of the Assemblies of God in New Zealand
- In office 1985 – February 2003
- Preceded by: Jim Williams
- Succeeded by: Ken Harrison

Wayne Hughes is a New Zealand former Pentecostal minister. Until early 2005, he was the senior pastor of the Takapuna Assembly of God in Auckland. A photographer by training, Hughes became pastor of the Takapuna Assembly of God in 1975. Under his leadership spanning three decades, it grew from 25 members to about 1600 adherents as of 2005. About a third of these are formal members.

As well as pastoring the Takapuna Assembly of God, Hughes also served as General Superintendent of the Assemblies of God in New Zealand from 1985 to 2003, when he resigned to give undivided attention to building his local church, which has set a goal of ten thousand members, and to care for his wife, Glenice, who has long suffered from Parkinson's disease.

In March 2005, Hughes entered the media spotlight with accusations that he had sexually abused a teenager in the 1980s. In April 2005, he opted to retire early, citing health reasons plus a desire to protect the church from negative media publicity, and in May he surrendered his credentials as a minister and withdrew from all ministry in the church. In public statements, he has denied the charges, but on legal advice has refrained from giving specifics.

As a preacher, Hughes had a strong fundamentalist message and an emphasis on evangelism. Hughes strongly opposes pre-marital sex, abortion, pornography, and gambling, factors that he saw as contributing to the breakdown of 'Christian morality'. He did not publicly endorse any particular political party, although he frequently did speak out against what he saw as the 'godless values' of leading politicians. His focus was more on Christian living than on politics, and his sermons focused largely on building Christian character.

Hughes had a close relationship with the Brownsville Assembly of God in Pensacola, Florida, and the Yoido Full Gospel Church in Seoul, Korea. Dr Michael Brown and Rev. Steven Hill, both instrumental in the Brownsville Revival, and Dr David Yonggi Cho, of Yoido, hosted major conferences in New Zealand under Wayne Hughes's auspices.

Hughes has three sons, two daughters, and a granddaughter. His younger daughter, Angela is also an ordained minister, and served as the Youth Pastor of her father's church until late 2006.

Hughes was succeeded in the position of General Superintendent of the Assemblies of God in NZ by Ken Harrison.

Preceded by Jim Williams	General Superintendent of the Assemblies of God in New Zealand; 1985–2003	Succeeded by Ken Harrison
