= My Hope Is Built on Nothing Less =

1834 Christian hymn by Edward Mote

- Hymn
- Edward Mote
- Text: Edward Mote
- Meter: 8.8.8.8 with refrain
- Melody: "Solid Rock" by William B. Bradbury
- Composed: 1834
- Published: 1837

"My Hope Is Built on Nothing Less" is a Christian hymn written by Edward Mote, a pastor at Rehoboth Baptist Church in Horsham, West Sussex. Mote wrote around 100 hymns, this one, which he wrote in 1834, being the best known of his.

The hymn "My Hope Is Built on Nothing Less" was published anonymously in several hymn collections before first being attributed to Edward Mote in a collection of approximately 100 of his hymns published in 1837 under the title Hymns of Praise, A New Selection of Gospel Hymns, Combining All the Excellencies of our Spiritual Poets, with Many Originals. Mote's original title was "The Immutable Basis for a Sinner's Hope" in this collection.

The refrain of "My Hope Is Built on Nothing Less" refers to the Parable of the Wise and the Foolish Builders and builds around the metaphor of Christ as a rock with a firm basis in scripture.

On Christ the Solid Rock I stand
All other ground is sinking sand

"My Hope Is Built on Nothing Less" is part of the gospel hymns genre. The first stanza declare's God's grace; stanzas 2 and 3 concern the application of that grace in times of trouble. In the final stanza, Mote brings his hymn full circle with the ultimate realization of God's grace.

The lyrics vary somewhat among various hymnals, but customarily the phraseology adheres to Mote's original.

The hymn became very popular and has been subject of many interpretations and covers.

== Alternative tunes ==
"My Hope Is Built on Nothing Less" has served as basis of other hymns such as "Solid Rock" that use the same refrain. The tune "Solid Rock" to which Mote's words are most commonly set was composed by William B. Bradbury in 1863.

Many times, both "My Hope Is Built on Nothing Less" and "Solid Rock" hymns are sung together as a medley. "Solid Rock" has also been sung as a medley with "In Christ Alone" written by Keith Getty and Stuart Townend.

Hillsong Music released in 2012 a worship song as the title track to Cornerstone, which uses the lyrics of "My Hope Is Built on Nothing Less" but with a different refrain and a different but similar melody.

=== "Melita" ===
An alternative tune sometimes used for "My Hope Is Built on Nothing Less" is "Melita", composed by John B. Dykes. The advantage of "Melita" for "My Hope Is Built on Nothing Less" is that "Melita" automatically emphasizes the word rock (which is central to the lyrics) by dedicating one and one-half beats to that word (where in "Solid Rock" it has merely an eighth note). A disadvantage of "Melita" is that the tune is inextricably identified with the hymn "Eternal Father, Strong to Save" (commonly recognized in the United States as the "Navy Hymn").
