= Victory Christian Church =

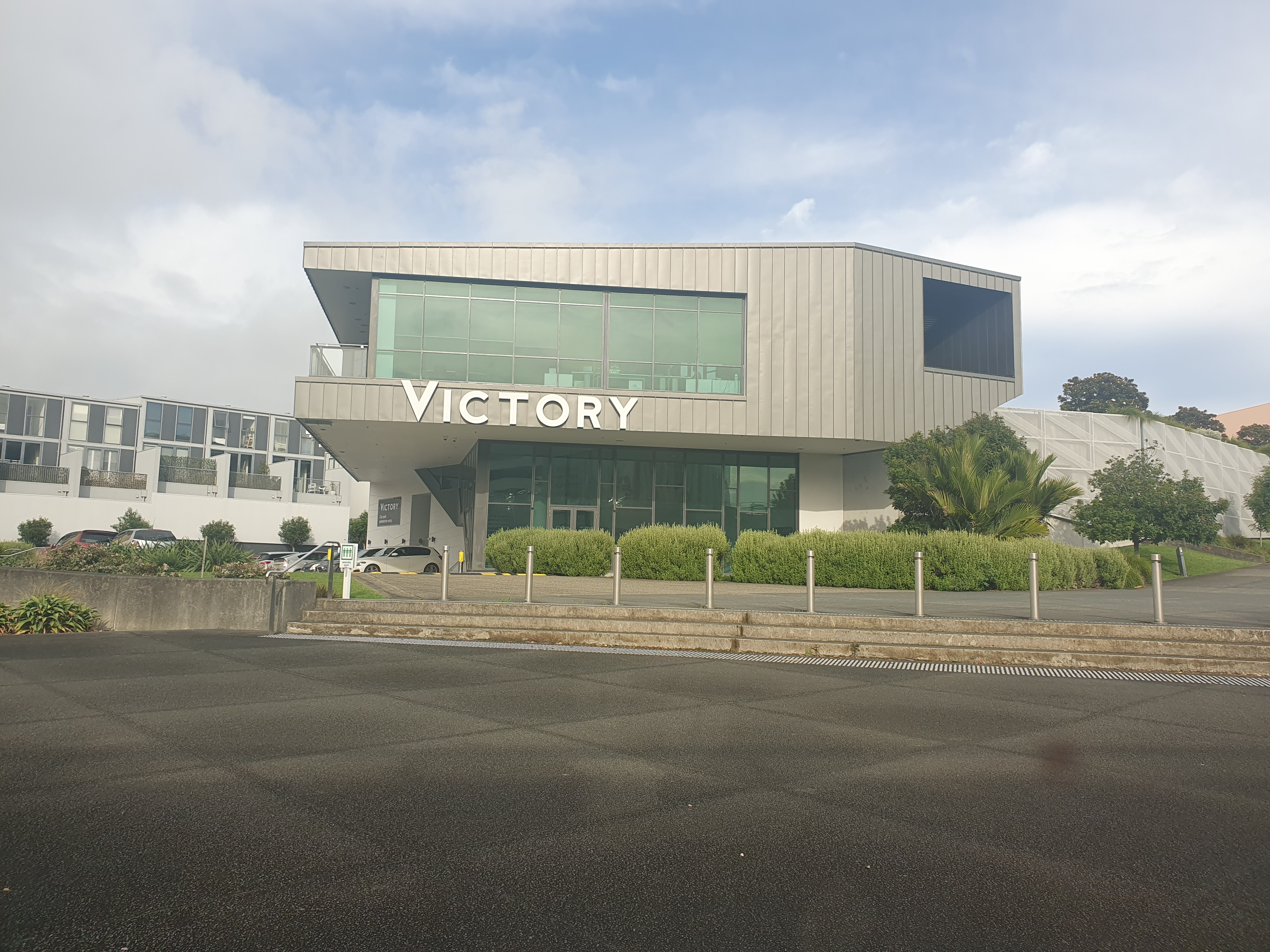
- The Victory Convention Centre, home of the Victory Christian Church
- Victory Christian Church
- 36°50′45″S 174°45′07″E
- Location: 98 Beaumont Street, Freemans Bay, Auckland
- Country: New Zealand
- Denomination: non-denominational neo-charismatic
- Website: www.victory.org.nz

History
- Founded: 1965

Victory Christian Church is a non-denominational neo-charismatic church in Auckland, New Zealand. First established as the Queen Street Assembly of God in 1965, the church moved from its premises on Queen Street, constructing the Victory Convention Centre in Freemans Bay.

== Origins ==
The church was founded in 1965 as Queen Street Assembly of God by Bob and Noelle Midgley.

== The 1970s ==
When the Midgleys left for further work overseas in December 1970, Neville Johnson became the new senior pastor. The work continued to experience growth seeing “amazing acts of healing and greatly increased attendances”

Growth occurred in all areas. Missionary work flourished under the leadership of John Watson, with outposts in Asia, Africa and South America. At one stage over 60% of the church income was spent on missions. The church was known for vibrant music, producing some recordings of live worship. Youth work flourished. An effective Bible School the Zion Bible Training Centre was established.

People were attracted from all over Australasia to Johnson's teaching. He was a proponent of the “Covering” or “Submission” theology and totally opposed to divorce and remarriage. Other teaching themes included victorious living and a strong emphasis on applications of the Old Testament.

== The 1980s ==
In 1982, pastor Johnson publicly opposed plans for a proposed monolithic statue of Jesus in the Waitematā Harbour.

Difficult times followed the resignation of Johnson from the church on 27 April 1983. The reasons given in a prepared public statement were 'misuse of office, and immoral, improper and deceitful conduct'. Such was the ambiguity and lack of clarity of the situation that many continued to give to Neville for months to come believing he had done nothing wrong. In the light of potential impact on the denomination as a whole, Jim Williams (the General Superintendent of the AoG at the time) wrote to every AoG pastor in the country.

Attendances fell from 2,500 to around 1,000. Income also fell. Mission work was scaled back (with many workers finding other supporters) and the Zion Bible Training Centre had to close. This from Clarke's history or the AoG in New Zealand:

Later still, when Ian Bilby, the charismatic leader of the Elim church, moved from Blenheim to Auckland and opened up a new work in Ponsonby, close to the Auckland Assembly, many of its former members joined his church.

The new senior pastor of the Auckland assembly was Kem Price, and under his leadership, large numbers of people left the church en masse, as he did not have the spiritual mandate or mantle to lead this flock - made evident by their exodus.

== New name ==
A financial rescue package saw the leadership of the church change and the church changed its name to the Victory Christian Centre. Following on from Kem Price, Rick Seaward, an American missionary from Singapore led the church from June 1988. After his return to Singapore in 1994 the leadership was taken up by was Max Legg. Subsequently, following a greater involvement with the Toronto Vineyard, he led the church out of the denomination in 2003. The church's new venue at 98 Beaumont Street, the Victory Convention Centre, has since become used as a venue for events and conventions unrelated to the church.

== Bibliography ==
- Philip D. Carew Māori, Biculturalism and the Assemblies of God in New Zealand, 1970 - 2008 Thesis
- Ian G. Clark Pentecost at the Ends of the Earth: The History of the Assemblies of God in New Zealand (1927-2003)
- Jonathan Harper, The Church that’s Taking Over Auckland Metro no. 29 (1983): 122-135
