= Brian Houston =

Australian pastor and evangelist

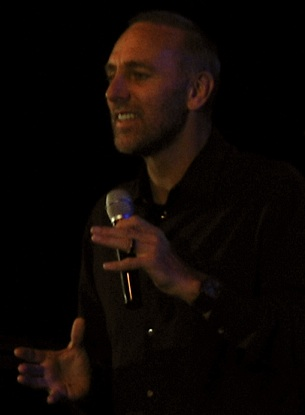
- Born: 17 February 1954 (age 72); Auckland, New Zealand
- Occupation: Pastor
- Spouse: Bobbie Houston
- Children: 3
- Father: Frank Houston
- Website: brianchouston.com

Brian Charles Houston (/ˈhjuːstən/ HEW-stən; born 17 February 1954) is a New Zealand-Australian former pastor and evangelist. He was the founder and senior pastor at Hillsong Church, based in Sydney with locations around the world. He was the national president of Australian Christian Churches, the Australian branch of the Assemblies of God, from 1997 to 2009.

In January 2022, Houston stepped aside from his roles within the church, after being criminally charged in Australia for allegedly concealing sexual abuse of a child by his father, of which he became aware in the 1990s. In March 2022, he stepped down as the global senior pastor of the church, after he was found to have breached the moral code of the church in his behaviour towards two women. In August 2023, he was found not guilty of concealing a serious indictable offence.

== Life and career ==
=== Early life ===
Brian Charles Houston was born in Auckland, New Zealand, on 17 February 1954. His parents, Frank and Hazel, were then Salvation Army officers. When Houston was three his parents joined the Assemblies of God in New Zealand and began pastoring a church in Lower Hutt, near Wellington, where Houston and his brother and three sisters spent their childhood. After completing school he went to a Bible college for three years. Shortly after completing college he met his future wife, Bobbie, on Papamoa Beach in New Zealand during a Christian convention. They were married in 1977.

=== Ministry ===
After moving to Sydney, New South Wales, Australia, in 1978, Houston served at the Sydney Christian Life Centre in Darlinghurst, where he became the assistant pastor to his father, Frank. In 1980 he started a church on the Central Coast and worked at a church in Liverpool in 1981. In 1983, Houston hired the Baulkham Hills Public School hall in Sydney's north-western suburbs to start a new church, the Hills Christian Life Centre. The first service was held on Sunday, 14 August 1983.

In May 1997, Houston was elected the president of the Assemblies of God in Australia (now called Australian Christian Churches) after the retirement of Andrew Evans. In February 2000, Houston helped to create the Australian Christian Churches network of Pentecostal churches. This alliance represented about 200,000 regular attenders in affiliate churches and Houston was its inaugural president. He is also a member of the Australian Pentecostal Ministers Fellowship (APMF).

Houston founded Hillsong Music Australia (HMA), the music ministry of Hillsong Church. Over a number of years, this music ministry has been successful with chart-topping albums from Hillsong United (born out of the youth ministry), and Hillsong Worship, which is the "worship expression" of Hillsong Church and incorporates their entire worship team. Annually, Hillsong records a live album, and songs from this recording are sung by church congregations all over the world. Hillsong songs include "Mighty to Save" and "Shout to the Lord"; with the latter featured on a 2008 special episode of American Idol called "Idol Gives Back".

In September 2018, Hillsong left the Australian Christian Churches to become an autonomous denomination, identifying itself more as a global and charismatic church. According to both Hillsong and ACC, the parting was amicable.

On 5 August 2021, New South Wales Police issued a warrant for Houston's arrest, alleging that he concealed child sexual abuse by his father, Frank. Houston was in the United States at the time of being charged and resigned from the church's board as a result of his arrest.

In March 2022, Houston resigned his position as senior global pastor after an internal investigation into his conduct with two women connected to the church. It was reported that in 2013 and 2019 he had engaged in inappropriate behaviour with both women.

In December 2023, Houston announced plans for starting a new community and church in 2024.

=== Views on homosexuality ===
Houston has made public comments on homosexuality and same-sex marriage:

"I do believe God's word is clear that marriage is between a man and a woman ... Hillsong Church welcomes ALL people but does not affirm all lifestyles. Put clearly, we do not affirm a gay lifestyle and because of this we do not knowingly have actively gay people in positions of leadership, either paid or unpaid."

— Do I Love Gay People?, Brian Houston, August 2015.

Houston has said, "I think my father was homosexual, a closet homosexual."

== Sexual abuse by Frank Houston ==
On 10 May 1999, Houston's father, Frank Houston, stepped down from the role of senior pastor at Sydney Christian Life Centre and Houston was appointed to the position. Brian Houston said that Frank "appeared rushed" to hand his church to him. This was before the revelations of Frank's child sexual abuse became known. Fifteen years later, in 2014, Houston spoke at hearings held by the Royal Commission into Institutional Responses to Child Sexual Abuse, stating that he received an allegation in October 1999 that his father sexually abused an Australian boy. Houston's statement and the evidence submitted to the commission revealed that, in November 1999, his father confessed to child sexual abuse. Houston reportedly forced his father into retirement and did not go to the police. The royal commission censured Houston for his failure to report the sexual abuse allegations against his father and for his failure to avoid a clear conflict of interest investigating his own father while serving as national president of the Assemblies of God in Australia.

On 5 August 2021, NSW Police issued a warrant for Houston to attend the Downing Centre Local Court in Sydney on 5 October, alleging that he concealed child sexual abuse by his father. Houston was in the United States at the time of being charged and resigned from the church's board as a result of his arrest. He was charged with concealing a serious indictable offence. Houston stood trial at Downing Centre Local Court and pleaded not guilty. In August 2023, he was found not guilty. The magistrate determined Houston had a "reasonable excuse" for not reporting his father as Houston believed the victim did not want the allegations reported to the police, however, the victim testified at trial that he did not make this request.

== Family and personal life ==
Houston and his wife Bobbie reside in the suburb of Glenhaven, Sydney, Australia. They have three children, Joel, Ben, and Laura. All are married and involved in the leadership of Hillsong Church.

Houston has been friends with Australian prime minister Scott Morrison, who described Houston as a mentor during his maiden address to parliament in 2008. Morrison has, however, distanced himself from Houston following the circumstances of Houston's resignation from Hillsong Church.

== Writings ==
Details of books written by Houston:

| Title | Year | ISBN | Notes |
|---|---|---|---|
| Get a Life | 1996 | ISBN 978-0957733619 | No longer in print |
| You Can Change the Future | 1999 | ISBN 978-0957733626 | No longer in print |
| You Need More Money | 1999 | ISBN 978-0957733602 | No longer in print |
| How to Build Great Relationships | 2002 | ISBN 978-0957733671 | |
| How to Live a Blessed Life | 2002 | ISBN 978-0957733633 | |
| How to Flourish in Life | 2003 | ISBN 978-0957733688 | |
| How to Make Wise Decisions | 2004 | ISBN 978-0957733602 | |
| How to Live in Health & Wholeness | 2005 | ISBN 978-0975206003 | |
| Selah | 2006 | ISBN 978-0975206027 | |
| For This Cause | 2006 | ISBN 978-0957733657 | |
| Selah 2 | 2007 | ISBN 978-0975206034 | |
| For This I Was Born | 2008 | ISBN 978-0849919138 | |
| Live Love Lead | 2015 | ISBN 978-1455533428 | |
| There Is More | 2018 | ISBN 978-0735290617 | |

Assemblies of God titles
| Preceded by Andrew Evans | National President of Australian Christian Churches; 1997–2009 | Succeeded by Wayne Alcorn |
Religious titles
| Preceded by Frank Houston | Senior Pastor, Hillsong Church; 1999–present Served alongside: Bobbie Houston | Incumbent |
