= Arise Church =

New Zealand Pentecostal church

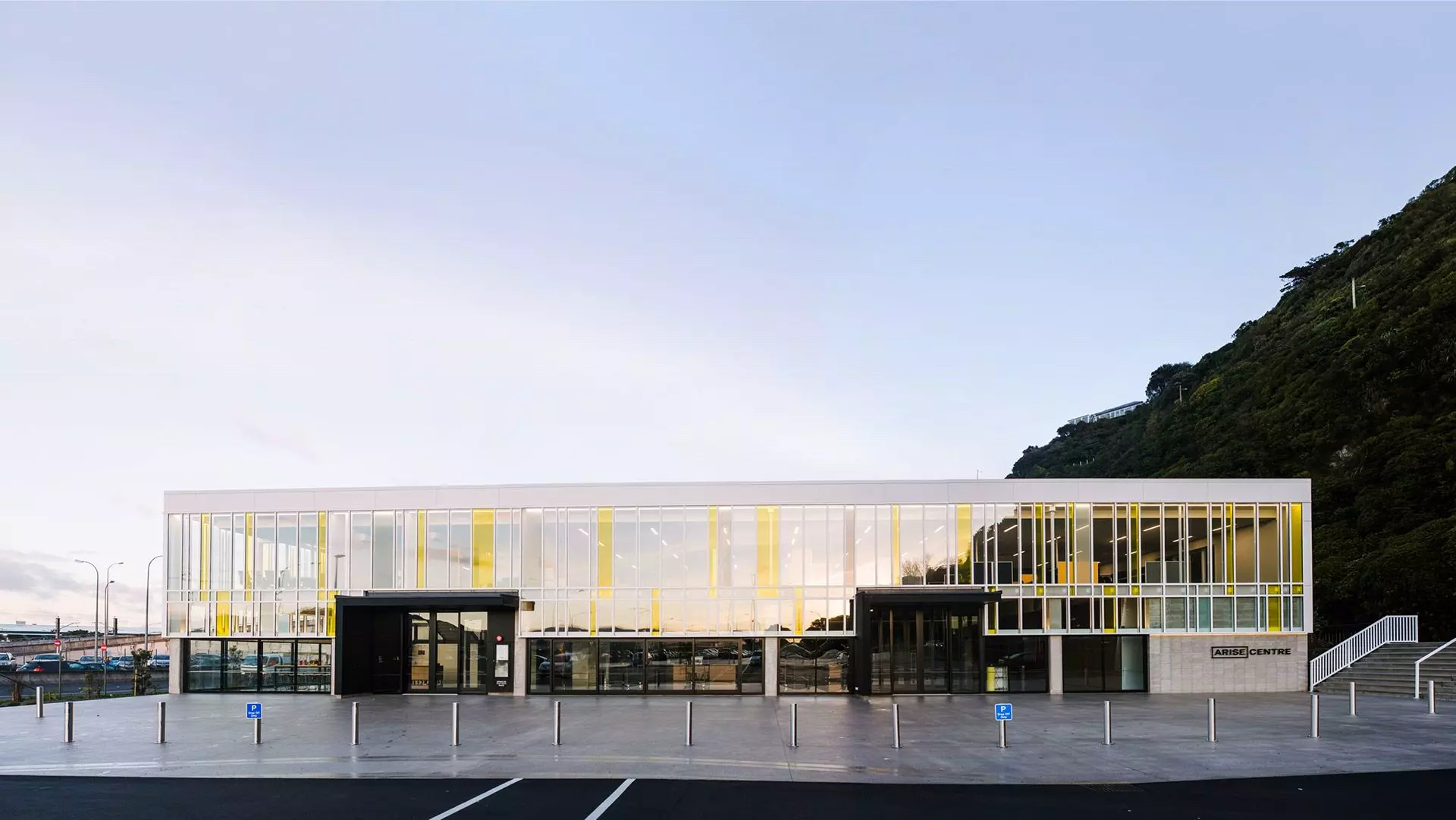
- Arise Centre in the Hutt Valley
- Country: New Zealand
- Website: arisechurch.com

History
- Founded: 2002; 24 years ago
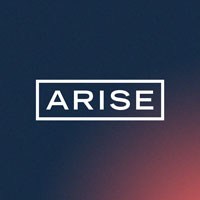
Arise Church
- Theology: Pentecostal
- Headquarters: Hutt Valley, New Zealand
- Founder: John & Gillian Cameron
- Places of worship: 10
- Aid organization: Arise Care
- Arise Church (New Zealand)

Arise Church is a New Zealand Pentecostal multi-campus church, with ten locations throughout the country.

== History ==
=== Origins and Expansion ===
Originally named City Church Wellington, it was founded in 2002 with seven people in a small dance and drama studio in the capital, Wellington. John and Gillian Cameron were the lead pastors of Arise Church. Arise Church has since expanded to include campuses in ten physical locations across New Zealand including Wellington, Hamilton, Whangārei, Kapiti, Palmerston North, Christchurch, Selwyn, Dunedin, Masterton, Porirua, with services based in the Wellington campus also being streamed online.

=== Leadership Changes ===
After the resignations of Senior Pastors John and Gillian Cameron in 2022, the Arise Board appointed Ben and Amy Kendrew as Interim Lead Pastors. The Kendrews were previously Christchurch Campus pastors and had been with Arise for 20 years.

On 1 August 2023, Arise Church announced Ben and Amy Kendrew as their new Senior Leaders. On 10 September 2023, Ben and Amy were officially commissioned in a Sunday service.

== Buildings ==
=== Arise Centre, Hutt Valley ===
In 2015, the Church entered the permitting process for construction for the Petone building, which includes both worship and office space. The Arise Centre is a multi-purpose auditorium and function venue built by Arise Church with a 1,200-seat purpose-built auditorium, 500 square metre foyer and café, 400 square metres of auxiliary rooms and 1,200 square metres of office space on level 2.

The Arise Centre officially opened in 2017. In 2018, Arise received a Wellington Architecture Award from the New Zealand Institute of Architects.

=== Arise Centre, Whangarei ===
Construction on the Whangarei Arise Centre began in 2019. The building sits on SH1, housing a 450-seat auditorium.

The opening was initially delayed by COVID-19 in 2020 but was officially completed and opened in 2022.

== Conferences ==
Arise Conference began as a camp in Wellington in 2004 and turned into a conference as the size of the church grew. Arise Church established two annual conferences, Passionate Women's Conference and Arise Conference.

=== Arise Conference ===
Arise Conference gathers the whole of Arise Church together once a year. Previous Arise Conference speakers include Craig Groeschel, Rich Wilkerson Jr., Chris Hodges (Church of the Highlands), and Samuel Rodriguez.

In 2013, it was announced that from 2014, Arise Conference would take over the Get Smart Youth Conference from LIFE Church Auckland. From 2014, Arise Conference ran as three conferences simultaneously, with the Kids Conference and Get Smart Youth Conference running alongside the Arise Conference. In 2017, Arise Conference was held in two venues. In 2019, Arise Conference held a conference in a second city, Christchurch.

=== Passionate Women's Conference ===
Passionate Women's Conference has close to 2,000 delegates and boasts world-renowned speakers like Lisa Bevere, DawnCheré Wilkerson, Maria Durso, and many more.

=== Cancellations ===
Due to the COVID-19 pandemic, the decision was made to cancel Arise Conference 2020 and revert to a single conference location in Wellington for 2021. The continued, unpredictable nature of COVID-19 drove the cancellation of the 2022 Arise Conference and Passionate conferences. In 2023 it was also cancelled, but now due to ongoing news surrounding the church. The church released a statement announcing the cancellation and the desire to focus on strengthening itself before continuing with future conferences.

== Arise Worship ==
ARISE Worship is the praise and worship expression of ARISE Church. ARISE Worship has released 4 albums since 2013. In 2013, the single "I'm in Love with Jesus" reached number 29 in the New Zealand Top 40. Their most recent album; Immerse, was released in 2021. It placed 40th on the New Zealand Top 40 albums list and reached 11th on the NZ album top 20. It stayed on the NZ albums charts for 3 weeks.

In 2016, Arise Worship was nominated for best album cover at the Vodafone New Zealand Music Awards.

Arise Worship Discography
Title	Album details	Album cover	New Zealand Top 40 positions			
Title	Album details	Album cover	Int. Peak	Int. Weeks	NZ Peak	NZ Weeks
God Alone	Released: 28 August 2014; Label: ARISE PRODUCTIONS LIMITED	Image: 100 pixels	16	2	7	4
Road to You	Released: 29 July 2016; Label: ARISE Publishing Ltd	Image: 100 pixels	2	2	2	3
Symphony	Released: 29 June 2018; Label: ARISE Publishing Ltd	Image: 100 pixels	-	-	-	-
IMMERSE (Live)	Released: 23 July 2021; Label: ARISE Publishing Ltd	Image: 100 pixels	40	1	11	3

== 2022 Media Attention ==
=== Internship Allegations ===
In mid April 2022, several ex-members alleged that Arise Church used unpaid volunteer labour; that interns were made to pay for their internships; and students were encouraged to donate to the church. In response to these allegations, Pastors John and Brent Cameron temporarily resigned from their pastoral duties and Arise's governing board pending an internal review.

In mid-May 2022, independent journalist David Farrier and Radio New Zealand reported that former members had alleged that Brent Cameron bullied interns, and even was naked in front of one. This behaviour had allegedly occurred during Arise church's annual tour of other New Zealand churches. It was alleged that this member received a confidential payout to ensure non-disclosure of Brent Cameron's behaviour. Another former staff member claimed Pastor John Cameron was more concerned with financial donations than the well-being of church members. In response to the allegations, two independent reviews (Pathfinding and BDO) were commissioned by the church.

In late May 2022, Arise Church's board confirmed that Pastors John and Gillian, along with Brent, had formally resigned from church leadership in the wake of the exploitation and bullying allegations.

=== Pathfinding Report ===
In mid-July 2022, Radio New Zealand reported that the Employment Relations Authority (ERA) had imposed a temporary non-publication order on an external review of Arise Church conducted by independent consultancy firm, Pathfinding. Both former members and Arise Church's leadership board expressed frustration with the delay in the report's release. Several former church members who spoke to Arise Church made allegations about bullying, unpaid labour, and homophobia. ERA indicated it would review its temporary non-publication order later in the month.

On 16 August 2022, David Farrier and Radio New Zealand obtained a leaked copy of Pathfinding's independent review of Arise Church. 545 current and former members of Arise (based on self reported status) submitted their experiences in Arise to the internal review. Pathfinding's report included allegations about sexual misconduct, racism, homophobia, body shaming, sexism, pastors forcing political views on members, distrust of medical treatments, bullying, ageism, exploitation of interns, people being forced to work despite injuries, and financial mismanagement. Pathfinding made 92 recommendations including issuing a genuine apology for hurt caused to current and former members, reporting illegal activities to the authorities, paying for former members to receive counselling, engaging a restorative justice facilitator, disavowing conversion therapy, promoting Māori church leadership, an independent review of the church finances, and replacing the entire leadership board. Pathfinding review member Reverend Frank Ritchie attributed the church's problems to centralised power, honour culture, its business practices, performance culture, and so-called "toxic positivity."

According to Stuff and TVNZ, some former members of Arise had attempted to prevent the report's 92 recommendations from being released publicly, leading to the ERA temporary non-publication order on the document in July 2022. The non-publication order meant that Arise was also unable to release the report. However, the order was subsequently rescinded following the report's leakage by David Farrier and Radio New Zealand, a teleconference held on 17 August between John and Gillian Cameron and ERA, and pressure from TVNZ. Arise released the report publicly, after this non-publication order was dropped. In a public statement, Arise Church claimed that the report was not an "investigative process" but rather a tool to gather information in order to influence changes to church policies and practices.

On 21 August 2022, church board members Kylie Fletcher and Ben Kendrew apologised to members who had experienced hurt, promising change.

In September 2022, Arise put together a Review Advisory Committee to process the Pathfinding Report (and other reports commissioned by the church), to collate findings and make further recommendations. This committee was made up of congregation, staff, and board representatives.

=== MBIE Investigation ===
On 18 August 2022, the Department of Internal Affairs's Charities Services division commenced an investigation of Arise Church in response to the issues raised by the Pathfinding report.

In January 2023, the Ministry of Business, Innovation and Employment (MBIE) meted Arise Church's leadership board with an infringement notice for not complying with a request to supply information on specific employee records. This information is related to wages, time, holiday, and leave records for migrant employees. By 7 March, the Arise board was banned from recruiting migrant workers until 16 July as a result of MBIE's investigation. This infringement notice was subsequently revoked 2 weeks later.

=== OUSA Ban ===
In mid-February 2023, the Otago University Students' Association (OUSA) excluded Arise Church from the university's Orientation Week Tent City following the 2022 allegations against the church.

=== Campus Changes ===
Before COVID-19, Arise's Wellington City campus was holding services every weekend in the city’s largest indoor venues including the Michael Fowler Centre, TSB Bank Arena, and the St. James Theatre.

In May 2019, it was announced Arise would be launching its ninth campus in Auckland in 2021, where they began initial services as of February 2021. In mid-October 2022, Arise Board and Leadership announced the resignation of Auckland campus pastors Ben and Anna Carroll, and the closure of the Auckland campus. The Carrolls rebranded the church as "Passion - AKL" and launched in 2023.

In November 2022, Arise merged the Wellington City and Hutt Valley campuses to form one Wellington campus.

== Activities ==
=== Arise Care ===
The church responded to the 2011 Christchurch earthquake by delivering shipments of shelf-stable food and emergency supplies, digging silt, fixing damage, and helping the elderly and vulnerable.

Arise received two awards for their help during the crisis:

- Award from Christchurch Mayor Bob Parker in recognition of acts of kindness, service, and heroism during and following the Christchurch earthquakes.
- Award from Hon Gerry Brownlee, MP and Minister for Christchurch Earthquake Recovery, in recognition of service to the local community in the aftermath of the earthquake.

In 2020, Arise leased an old warehouse and converted it into a storehouse for its Arise Care operations. The storehouse is used to run events such as Big Hearts packing days, cooking ready-made frozen meals, and vulnerable women events.

=== Evangelism in schools ===
Arise Church has been accused of various attempts to engage in preaching in public schools, which some argue contravenes legislation stating teaching in New Zealand schools must be secular during school hours. A former member of the Arise Church raised concerns about some of the methods they use, particularly in targeting youth, as well as their ideology.

== Views ==
=== Beliefs and theology ===
AriseChurch professes adherence to a Christian theology mostly resembling Pentecostalism.

=== Conversion therapy bill ===
In August 2021, Arise supported a proposed ban on conversion therapy in New Zealand but with amendments, alleging that it criminalised parents, counsellors and pastors seeking to help children and young people dealing with sexuality or gender issues.

In September 2021, Radio New Zealand released an article accusing Arise and other churches of misinterpreting the Bill and causing confusion.

== Reception ==
In 2012, Paul Morris, Professor of Religious Studies at Victoria University, Arise is part of a "religious revival" in New Zealand's youth culture. In 2014, Radio New Zealand's youth channel, The Wireless, compared Arise to Australia's Hillsong Church, and other papers have described Arise as having, "a big youth following".
