= Bobbie Houston =

New Zealand-born pastor

- Born: 16 January 1957 (age 69); New Zealand
- Occupation: Pastor
- Spouse: Brian Houston
- Children: 3
- Website: bobbiehouston.com

Roberta Lee Houston (born 16 January 1957), better known as Bobbie Houston, is a New Zealand-born Australian Pentecostal pastor in the Australian Christian Churches. Houston and her husband, Brian were the Senior Pastors of the Hillsong Church in Baulkham Hills, Sydney, Australia prior to the latter's departure in 2022.

== Personal life ==
Bobbie and her husband, Brian Houston moved to Australia in February 1978, serving at Sydney Christian Life Centre, Darlinghurst, under Brian Houston's father, Frank Houston. In the early 1980s, Brian and Bobbie Houston started a church on the Central Coast, and a church in Liverpool. In 1983, they moved to Sydney's north-western suburbs and hired the Baulkham Hills Public School hall to start a new church, Hills Christian Life Centre. The first service was held on Sunday 14 August 1983 and is today Hillsong Church. Hillsong Church is located in major cities around the world.

The Colour Your World Women's Conference is hosted annually by Houston and the Hillsong team in Sydney, London, the US, Cape Town and Kiev.

== Ministry ==
Houston ran the weekly women's ministry of Hillsong. In 1997 she also started the annual Colour Your World Women's Conference.

The Colour Sisterhood is a foundation set up by Hillsong Church through Hillsong Women, the women's ministry of the church.

Houston was made redundant on 8 April, which concluded her employment at Hillsong Church following her husband's resignation, according to husband Brian Houston’s Instagram post.

== Bibliography ==
Bobbie Houston has written several books. Below are details about her bibliography.

Title	Year	ISBN	Notes
Heaven is in This House	2001	ISBN 095773364X	
"I'll Have What She's Having	2008	ISBN 0849919770	
The Sisterhood	2016	ISBN 1455592498	
Stay The Path	2017	ISBN 1455592528	
