= Pentecostal Church of New Zealand =

- Classification: Finished Work Pentecostal
- Origin: 1924

The Pentecostal Church of New Zealand (PCNZ) was a Finished Work Pentecostal denomination established in 1924 that was the first attempt at organizing the Pentecostal movement in New Zealand. After a series of splits, the church disbanded in 1952.

The roots of Pentecostalism in New Zealand are in late 19th-century revivalism, which emphasized personal experience and divine healing. However, Classical Pentecostalism emerged only in the 1920s, largely as the result of British evangelist Smith Wigglesworth's healing campaigns in the country, first in 1922 and then in 1923–1924. The Pentecostal Church of New Zealand was formed with the help of American evangelist A. C. Valdez in 1924 to preserve and organize the results of the Wigglesworth campaigns.

By 1926, conflict within the church, particularly over governance, began a process of fragmentation. Some congregations left the PCNZ and affiliated with the Assemblies of God. In 1932, the arrival of the British-based Apostolic Church in New Zealand led to a loss of disaffected PCNZ members. The Pentecostal Church also had to compete with other Pentecostal groups, such as A. H. Dallimore's Revival Fire churches and the New Zealand counterpart to the Australian-based Christian Revival Crusade.

The Pentecostal Church split again in 1946 after three American pastors introduced baptism in the name of "Lord Jesus Christ" (rather than of the Father, Son and Holy Spirit). This was understood in a trinitarian sense and was not the same as the Unitarian baptism in Jesus' name. These American pastors led a breakaway group that became associated with the Latter Rain Movement and today is known as the New Life Churches. What remained of the Pentecostal Church in New Zealand disbanded in 1952 and affiliated with the Elim Pentecostal Church based in the United Kingdom. The Elim Church of New Zealand claims over 40 congregations. Remnants of the Pentecostal movement can be found all over New Zealand, churches like Harmony Church in Christchurch, holds pentecostal roots and values.
