= Iliafi Esera =

New Zealand clergy

Iliafi Esera ONZM
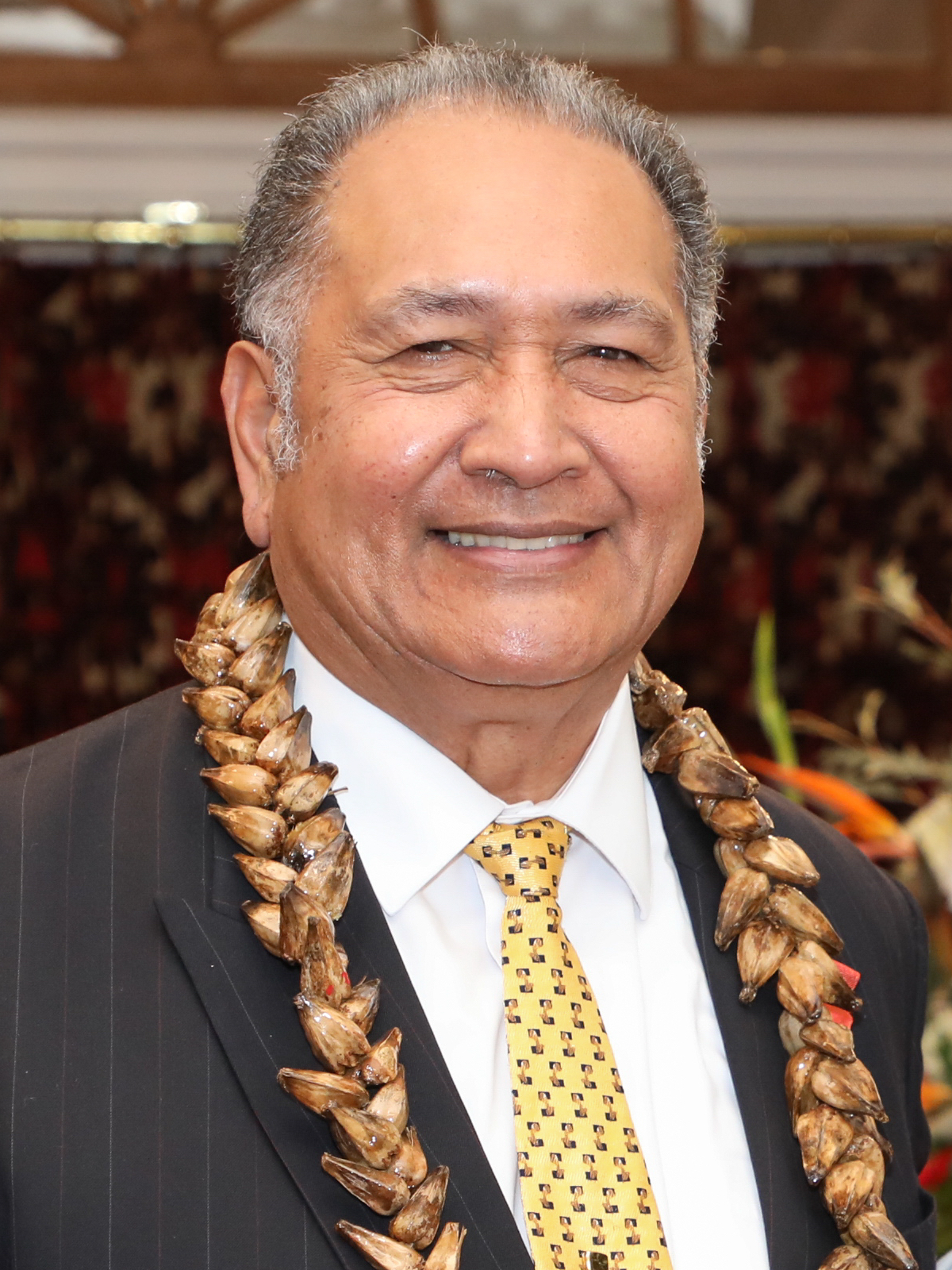
- Esera in 2022

12th General Superintendent of the Assemblies of God in New Zealand
- In office November 2011 – September 2023
- Preceded by: Ken Harrison
- Succeeded by: Terry Bradley

Assistant Superintendent of the Assemblies of God in New Zealand
- In office October 2003 – November 2011
- Preceded by: Kem Price
- Succeeded by: Donald McDonell

Personal details
- Born: Lalomanu, Western Samoa
- Spouse: Falefia-o-alii (Fia) Esera
- Relations: Judah; Jesse; Molly-Rose; Carmel; Luke; Akira; Ruby; Joel; Olivia; Eva; Josephine; Joseph
- Children: Jason; Arohaina; Olympia; Susana; Faith; Tasha; Anneke; Grace

Iliafi Talotusitusi Esera ONZM is a Christian minister of the Assemblies of God movement.

Pastor Iliafi is an internationally renowned speaker amongst Christian organizations. Reverend Esera is of Samoan birth and currently resides in New Zealand, but regularly speaks in America, Asia and Oceania. He was a member of the Assembly of God in New Zealand Executive Presbytery from 2002-2023 and held the position of General Superintendent of the Assemblies of God in New Zealand from 2011-2023. He also held the position of Assistant Superintendent of the AGNZ from 2003 until his election to General Superintendent in November 2011. Iliafi is the senior pastor of Faith City Church in Wanganui, New Zealand.

Reverend Esera is of Samoan birth and married to Falefia-o-alii (called Fia), they have eight children and 11 grandchildren.

Iliafi ministers at conferences all over the world which have included Promise Keepers NZ & Youth of the Nation in Whanganui.

In the 2021 Queen's Birthday Honours, Esera was appointed an Officer of the New Zealand Order of Merit, for services to the Samoan community and Christian ministry.

Preceded by Ken Harrison	General Superintendent of the Assemblies of God in New Zealand; 2011–2023	Succeeded by Terry Bradley
Preceded by Kem Price	Assistant Superintendent of the Assemblies of God in New Zealand; 2003–2011	Succeeded by Donald McDonell
Preceded by Rick Sutcliffe	Senior Pastor of Faith City Church A/G; 1992–present	Incumbent
