= Edward Mote =

British hymnwriter (1797–1874)

Edward Mote 1797–1874

Edward Mote (21 January 1797 - 13 November 1874) was a pastor and hymn writer. Born in London on 21 January 1797, his parents managed a pub and often left Edward to his own devices playing in the street. Speaking of these childhood years he once said, "So ignorant was I that I did not know that there was a God." He was finally exposed to the Christian gospel and was baptised the age of 18. He was trained as a cabinet maker and worked in London for 37 years. Only in his 50s did he enter the ministry and was pastor at Rehoboth Baptist Church in Horsham, West Sussex for 26 years. He was well liked by the congregation in Horsham and they offered him the church building as a gift. Mote replied "I do not want the chapel, I only want the pulpit; and when I cease to preach Christ, then turn me out of that." He died on 13 November 1874 and is buried in the church yard at Rehoboth Church.

== Hymns ==
Perhaps his best known hymn is "My Hope Is Built on Nothing Less", which refers to the Parable of the Wise and the Foolish Builders, with its refrain 'On Christ the solid Rock I stand, All other ground is sinking sand'.

A collection of approximately 100 of his hymns was published under the title Hymns of Praise, A New Selection of Gospel Hymns, Combining All the Excellencies of our Spiritual Poets, with Many Originals.
