= Frank Houston =

Pastor and evangelist

8th General Superintendent of the Assemblies of God in New Zealand
- In office December 1965 – June 1977
- Preceded by: R R Read
- Succeeded by: Jim Williams

Senior Pastor, Sydney Christian Life Centre
- In office June 1977 – 10 May 1999
- Preceded by: new title
- Succeeded by: Brian and Bobbie Houston

Personal details
- Born: 22 April 1922 Whanganui, New Zealand
- Died: 8 November 2004 (aged 82) Sydney, New South Wales, Australia
- Spouse(s): Hazel Scott (m. 19??; died 2004)
- Children: 5, including Brian Houston

William Francis "Frank" Houston (22 April 1922 – 8 November 2004) was a Pentecostal Christian pastor in the Assemblies of God in New Zealand and Australia. Frank Houston founded Sydney Christian Life Centre, which would eventually come under the leadership of his son Pastor Brian Houston before merging into Hillsong Church. In the last years of his life, Frank Houston’s conduct of child sexual abuse was exposed.

== Biography ==
Houston was born in Whanganui, New Zealand, on 22 April 1922. He commenced ministry training as a Salvation Army officer shortly after turning 18. He married Hazel and they had five children, including Brian. The couple transferred their allegiance to the Baptist church, and later to the Assemblies of God in New Zealand. Houston initially attended the Ellerslie Assembly in 1960, but later transferred to the Lower Hutt Assemblies of God, and served as the superintendent of the Assemblies of God in New Zealand from 1965 to 1971.

In 1977, Houston moved to Sydney, Australia, and founded the Sydney Christian Life Centre in "Sherbrooke Hall" in Double Bay, which was not affiliated with any denomination in its first decade, but then became an Assemblies of God church. With further growth it moved to Darlinghurst, and then warehouse premises in the inner Sydney suburb of Waterloo, which housed a 600-seat auditorium, a Bible and Creative Arts College, and many other ministry arms. Houston was known by those close to him in the church as "the Bishop", not as an official title but as a humorous reference to mainstream churches. He was also involved in over twenty Christian Life Centres being opened throughout New South Wales and overseas. Houston served as pastor at his church for more than two decades, and in senior positions within the Assemblies of God in Australia.

In 1999, after consultation amongst senior pastoral staff of the church, and the staff of Hills Christian Life Centre, a daughter church pastored by his son Brian, the churches were merged to become the Hillsong Church.

== Sexual crimes against children ==
During Houston's tenure as lead of Assemblies of God in New Zealand from 1965 to 1977, he abused many young boys in New Zealand and Australia. He routinely sexually abused one victim in Sydney from the ages of 7 to 12. In 1999, the boy's mother reported the abuse to the church. At the time, Houston's son, Brian, was the National President of the Assemblies of God in Australia organisation. Upon hearing the report of the sexual abuse, Brian Houston immediately dismissed his father, forcing him to quietly resign from the Sydney Christian Life Centre with a pension. By November 2000, internal church investigations had discovered several additional cases of child abuse. Although Brian Houston and the Assemblies of God executive council were legally obligated to report the crimes, they did not do so. Frank Houston made a payment of A$10,000 to his victim.

In August 2007, further allegations emerged that Houston had sexually abused a trainee pastor during counselling sessions in the early 1980s.

On 8 October 2014 Brian Houston admitted to a Sydney hearing of the Royal Commission into Institutional Responses to Child Sexual Abuse that his father was guilty of other cases of sexual abuse against children. Brian Houston further expressed regret at not having reported his father to the police when he learned of the abuse in 1999, but noted that other senior members of the church had also known and also did nothing. They claim that of the reasons why they chose not to go to the police was because one of the victims requested they not report it, though the victim states that he did not make this request. In 2015, the Royal Commission censured Brian Houston for his failure to report the sexual abuse allegations against his father and for his failure to avoid a clear conflict of interest when he investigated his own father while serving as National President of the Assemblies of God in Australia.

In November 2018, 60 Minutes aired a segment revisiting the sexual abuse scandal, because newly revealed documentation allegedly reveals that Brian Houston was deeply involved in a cover-up and that Houston's abusive behaviour was worse than initially thought. Brian Houston allegedly used his position within the Assemblies of God in Australia organisation to conceal his father's serial child sexual abuse. The matter was referred to the New South Wales Police Force, which confirmed that Brian Houston was under criminal investigation for failing to report a serious crime. Following the 60 Minutes story, Hillsong released a statement in response to the allegations.

On 5 August 2021, NSW Police issued a warrant for Brian Houston to attend the Downing Centre Local Court in Sydney on 5 October, alleging that he concealed child sexual abuse by his late father, Frank. Brian Houston was in the United States at the time he was charged.

On 5 October 2021, Brian Houston's lawyer said her client intended to plead not guilty. The prosecution also stated, "Whereas in 1970 Frank Houston committed a serious indictable offence, namely indecent assault of a male, Brian Houston between 15 September 1999 and 9 November 2004 at Baulkham Hills and elsewhere in the state of NSW, believing that Frank Houston committed that offence and knowing that he had information that might be of material assistance in securing the prosecution of Frank Houston for that offence, without reasonable excuse, failed to bring that information to the attention of NSW Police". Brian Houston stood trial at Downing Centre Local Court and pleaded not guilty. In August 2023, he was found not guilty. The magistrate determined that Brian Houston had a "reasonable excuse" for not reporting his father as he believed the victim did not want the allegations reported to the police, however, the victim testified at trial that he did not make this request.

== Death ==
Houston died in Sydney on 8 November 2004, aged 82 years. Mourners at his funeral included politicians Louise Markus (a member of Hillsong Church), Alan Cadman, and Andrew Scipione. Houston's wife, Hazel, had died six months earlier.

Assemblies of God titles
Preceded by R Read	General Superintendent of the Assemblies of God in New Zealand; 1967–1977	Succeeded by Jim Williams
New title	Senior Pastor, Sydney Christian Life Centre; 1977–1999	Succeeded by Brian Houston and Bobbie Houston
