= Rich Wilkerson Jr. =

American pastor and model (born 1984)

- Born: Richard Preston Wilkerson Jr. March 28, 1984 (age 41)
- Occupation: Pastor
- Spouse: DawnCheré Wilkerson (m. 2006)
- Children: 4

Richard Preston Wilkerson Jr. (born March 28, 1984) and his wife DawnCheré are the pastors of Vous Church in Miami, Florida.

Wilkerson is the son of Robyn and Rich Wilkerson Sr, who lead Trinity Church, a megachurch in Miami affiliated with the Assemblies of God; Wilkerson Sr. is a cousin of David Wilkerson, author of The Cross and the Switchblade.

Vous Church was spun out of Trinity Church in 2015. It started as a young adult and youth ministry program within Trinity called The Rendezvous, later shortened to The Vous. Vous incorporates elements of contemporary popular culture, as other ministries aimed at young people have done in the past.

In 2014, Wilkerson officiated the marriage of Kim Kardashian and Kanye West; Kanye had first attended a Vous service after being invited by Chris Julian, who co-owns LeBron James's Miami boutique, where Kanye shopped. Julian was a member of Trinity. The press coverage of the wedding led to Wilkerson and DawnCheré becoming household names. The Oxygen television network created a reality show called "Rich In Faith" centered on the couple that ran for ten episodes in 2015 and 2016.

In 2015, Wilkerson released a book called Sandcastle Kings with artwork by Kanye West, in 2018, he released a book called Friend of Sinners: Why Jesus Cares More About Relationship Than Perfection., and in 2022, he released his third book called Single and Secure.
