= New Life Churches, New Zealand =

New Life Churches
- New Life Churches International
- Country: New Zealand
- Denomination: Pentecostal
- Website: www.newlifechurches.nz

History
- Founded: 1978

New Life Churches, formerly known as New Life Churches International, is a Pentecostal Christian church movement in New Zealand.

== History ==
Early influences date from the 1940s when a series of meetings conducted by overseas 'Bethel Temple' missionaries resulted in the planting of congregations in New Zealand and Australia. Some of its early leaders, among them Peter Morrow, attended a Bible college in Sydney in 1951. Further evangelistic campaigns and training occurred after 1957 and throughout the 1960s. In 1960, meetings began in Timaru that led to the establishment of Timaru New Life Centre. Also, many evangelistic campaigns took place throughout New Zealand. The first missionaries were sent overseas in this period. Peter Morrow began work in Christchurch in 1962 as the pastor of the church there, which was then known as the Christchurch Revival Fellowship. By 1964, thirteen "indigenous" churches had been established in the South Island. A number of congregations were planted in the North Island over the same period. Bible schools were established in Tauranga, Auckland and Christchurch. In 1975, Auckland pastor Shaun Kearney (an associate of the then ICNZ) was influential in setting up the Associated Pentecostal Churches of New Zealand, a pan-Pentecostal fellowship of church groups. In 1978 the Christchurch Revival Fellowship renamed itself the New Life Centre Christchurch, later becoming City New Life Church and now known as Majestic Church. This church functioned as the administrative offices of the New Life Centers of New Zealand for many years in the late 1980s and 1990s but is now an independent fellowship having left the New Life Churches movement. In 1987, twenty associate pastors of ICNZ left the renamed New Life Churches group, in reluctance to embrace the new governmental structure chosen at the 1987 ICNZ conference. These pastors eventually formed a new association named South Pacific Fellowship, and endeavored to maintain the less structured fellowship they had known prior to 1987. The name 'New Life Churches' was adopted during the 1988 ICNZ Conference and a structure of national governance, including elected apostles and regional leaders, was agreed upon. The first apostles chosen by the 1987 conference were Rob Wheeler, a New Zealand Evangelist and Peter Morrow, an Australian evangelist. Both these men had been leading figures in the former ICNZ, and pioneers in spreading the Latter Rain Revival in New Zealand. Many member churches became involved heavily in social conservative political activism against the ratification of the United Nations Convention on the Elimination of All Forms of Discrimination Against Women in 1984, the establishment of Lyndhurst Hospital (a free-standing abortion clinic) in Christchurch, and passage of the Homosexual Law Reform Act in 1986. They had also earlier been involved in the establishment of the Coalition of Concerned Citizens in 1974 and the Save Our Homes Campaign in 1977. The New Life Churches are now an international movement with affiliates in Australia, Asia and the Pacific. In keeping with Pentecostal Congregationalist philosophy, individual churches in the NLCNZ are autonomous and not governed by the central organization.

== Bibliography ==
- Brett Knowles: New Life: The New Life Churches of New Zealand: 1942-1979, 3rd edition: Lexington, Kentucky: Emeth Press: 2015:ISBN 978-1-60947-093-7
- For New Zealand Pentecostalism as a whole: Brett Knowles: Transforming Pentecostalism: The Changing Face of New Zealand Pentecostalism, 1920-2010: Lexington, Kentucky: Emeth Press: 2014:ISBN 978-1-60947-076-0
- David Collins: The Latter Rain Revival - The New Zealand Story. 2021 Little King Books. ISBN 978-0-473-57338-6

== See also ==
- Christian politics in New Zealand
