= Assemblies of God in New Zealand =

Pentecostal denomination in New Zealand

- Abbreviation: AGNZ
- Type: Christian denominaiton
- Classification: Protestant
- Orientation: Pentecostal
- National leader: Terry Bradley
- Associations: World Assemblies of God Fellowship
- Region: New Zealand
- Origin: March 1927
- Separated from: Pentecostal Church of New Zealand
- Official website: agnz.org

The Assemblies of God in New Zealand is a Pentecostal denomination in New Zealand and a member of the World Assemblies of God Fellowship. In early 2026, the denomination reports having 222 congregations and 30,000 members.

In 2016, the largest congregation was the Harbourside Church A/G in Takapuna, founded in the 1950s, with a weekly attendance of 1,500 people.

== History ==
The Pentecostal movement in New Zealand started by the crusades of evangelist Smith Wigglesworth in 1922 and 1923, which led to the establishment of the Pentecostal Church of New Zealand (PCNZ). As the result of an internal dispute, 13 congregations and some pastors withdrew from the PCNZ and in March 1927 sent a cablegram to the General Council of the Assemblies of God of the United States asking for affiliation.

The 1930s were hard years for the Assemblies of God in New Zealand because of internal doctrinal disputes, the proselitism of the Apostolic Church, fragile relations with the PCNZ and economic distress generated by the 1929 Depression. However, frequent visits of preachers such as Aimee McPherson and A. C. Valdez helped to sustain the movement. During the 1960s, the Assemblies of God in New Zealand experienced regrowth and came to be the largest Pentecostal denomination in the country. In 1975, the AGNZ was one of the founders of the Associated Pentecostal Churches of New Zealand, which counts more than 700 congregations.

In 1986 the denomination decided to create a new teaching faculty, and a Bible College was opened the following year; it later partnered with the Southern Cross College in Sydney and changed its name to the Alphacrucis College.

The 60th General Council, meeting at City West Church A/G in New Plymouth in 2011, saw the election of its first non-European General Superintendent in Samoan-born minister Iliafi Esera. This was also the first time the General Superintendency was held by a minister in a small New Zealand city (Wanganui). The 60th General Council also elected its first woman to the Executive Presbytery, Pastor Mina Acraman of Miracle Centre A/G, Hastings.

== Leadership ==
From 1927 until 1944 the Assemblies of God is New Zealand leadership body was called the General Council (or the General Council Executive). From then until 1997 it was called the Executive Council. It was then renamed the Executive Presbytery. Originally the leader of this body was simply referred to as Chairman. In 1962 the title of the Leader of the Council was changed to General Superintendent.

The following individuals have served as the Leader of the Assemblies of God in New Zealand:

| Ordinal | Officeholder | Term start | Term end | Time in office | Notes |
|---|---|---|---|---|---|
| 1 | W. Chatterton | March 1927 | September 1927 | 184 days | |
| 2 | H. H. Bruce | September 1927 | 1931 | 3–4 years | |
| 3 | E. T. Mellor | 1931 | 1941 | 9–10 years | |
| 4 | A. W. Thompson | 1941 | 1953 | 11–12 years | |
| 5 | T. W. Whiting | 1951 | 1959 | 7–8 years | |
| 6 | G. C. Jennings | 1959 | 1960 | 0–1 years | |
| 7 | R. R. Read | 1960 | 1967 | 6–7 years | |
| 8 | Frank Houston | December 1965 | June 1977 | 11 years, 182 days | |
| 9 | Jim Williams | 8 October 1977 | 1985 | 7–8 years | |
| 10 | Wayne Hughes | 1985 | February 2003 | 17–18 years | |
| 11 | Ken Harrison | October 2003 | November 2011 | 8 years, 31 days | |
| 12 | Iliafi Esera ONZM | November 2011 | September 2023 | 11 years, 304 days | |
| 13 | Terry Bradley | September 2023 | incumbent | 2 years, 363 days | |

== See also ==
Samoan Assemblies of God in New Zealand
