= Schweizerische Pfingstmission =

Pentecostal Christian denomination

The Swiss Pentecostal Mission (German: Schweizerische Pfingstmission, abbreviated SPM) is the largest Pentecostal Christian denomination in Switzerland. Officially known in English as the Pentecostal Assemblies of Switzerland, it is the Swiss branch of the Assemblies of God, the largest Pentecostal denomination in the world. In 2013, the denomination had 10,000 adherents in 66 churches across Switzerland, and operated a conference center in Emmetten.

== History ==
Pentecostalism was brought to Switzerland in 1907 by two women missionaries from Norway, A. Telle and D. Gregersen. They came into contact with a small group, the Zion Fellowship of Zurich, which became the first Pentecostal congregation in the country. Its first pastor, former Anglican clergyman C.E.D. de Labilliere, became a pioneer of the movement. In 1909, he started publishing the periodical Die Verheissung des Vaters, which would become the official publication of the SPM. During this period, prominent Pentecostal leaders visited Switzerland, including Thomas Ball Barratt, Alexander Boddy, Jonathan Paul, and Geritt Polman, the Pentecostal pastor from Amsterdam who had been a member of the Salvation Army. In 1920, Smith Wigglesworth held meetings in Switzerland in which "remarkable healings" were reported.

The Berlin Declaration, issued by German evangelicals in 1909, caused hardship for the Swiss Pentecostals as it contributed to a rift between them and the Swiss Evangelical Alliance. Nevertheless, Pentecostalism continued to spread. In 1921, the Swiss Pentecostal Mission Society (Schweizerische Pfingstmissionsgesellschaft) was organized to provide training and support for mission work. Their first missionary was sent to the British colony of Basutoland, now Lesotho. In 1935, the churches in partnership with the mission society decided to establish a formal denomination, the Swiss Pentecostal Mission.

The leader of the SPM, Leonhard Steiner, in 1947 initiated the Pentecostal World Conference in Zürich. Another Pentecostal denomination, Freie Christengemeinden der Schweiz (FCGS), went bankrupt in 1993, and many of its congregations joined the SPM.
