= Mae Eleanor Frey =

American pentecostal minister and writer

- Born: Mae Eleanor Edick; August 5, 1865; Deposit, New York, US
- Died: December 4, 1954 (aged 89); Stamford, Connecticut, US
- Occupations: Minister, Evangelist
- Known for: First woman ordained in the American Baptist Churches USA denomination
- Spouse(s): Peter Isaiah (P. I.) Frey, 1887–1928
- Children: 2

Mae Eleanor Edick Frey (August 5, 1865 – December 4, 1954) was an American Pentecostal minister, leader, and writer. She was a social newspaper reporter when she was assigned to cover religious revival meetings; at one of these meetings, she met her future husband, evangelist P. I. Frey (they were married in 1887), and was converted to Christianity. She became an evangelist, working alongside her husband, and in 1905, became the first woman to be ordained in the Northern Baptist Convention (now the American Baptist Churches USA). Frey served as pastor and assistant pastor of congregations in New York, Pennsylvania, and New Jersey. She became a military chaplain and nurse late in World War I, doing volunteer hospital work with the Red Cross while maintaining her regular preaching duties. Despite success as a minister and evangelist, Frey's spiritual and vocational dissatisfaction brought her to a meeting at a Pentecostal church, where she was introduced to Pentecostalism, including the doctrine of the baptism with the Holy Spirit and the practice of speaking in tongues, which "changed the trajectory of her life and ministry". She and her husband joined the Assemblies of God (AG) denomination and in 1920, traveled the country as evangelists. Frey was never ordained by the AG church due to their prohibition of women ministers, but she was hired as temporary pastor in a few churches and held an evangelist certificate with the denomination until her death in 1954.

Frey attracted large crowds wherever she spoke, which included Canada, Europe, and the Middle East. She wrote two novels, The Minister (1939) and Altars of Brick (1943), using narrative fiction to present the ethical and theological issues of her time, and to attack modernism. In 1995, Pentecostal historian Edith Blumhofer compiled Frey's letters to AG leaders, written from 1924 to 1950; Blumhofer called them "revealing glimpses into various facets of American Pentecostalism" and historian Joy E. A. Qualls called Frey's letters "a revealing look at the life of an early pioneer of Pentecostal ministry in the United States". Frey "helped establish a place for women in leadership within Pentecostal and Baptist circles" and "faced the challenges of a woman in ministry with tenacity". She retired in September 1950 and died in Stamford, Connecticut, on December 4, 1954.

== Early life ==
Mae Eleanor Edick was born on August 5, 1865, to Erastus Edick, a brick layer, and Catherine S. Edick, a suffragist and writer, in Deposit, New York. She was one of eight children; four of her siblings died at an early age. According to Frey's biographer Deborah L. Fulthorp, Mae Edick "overcame obstacles early on with tenacity and unbridled fortitude". The family moved to Pennsylvania before Edick was two years old; she was sickly for most of her childhood. The family had financial difficulties due to her father's drinking. He admitted later in life that he felt guilty for not caring for his family; he was "non-religious", but his daughter helped him convert to Christianity at the end of his life. Edick's mother Catherine, who was active in the suffragist movement in New York and a member of the temperance society, was not a regular church-goer, but "firmly believed in predestination". Catherine Edick, who was also an aspiring playwright, pushed her daughter into the theater starting at the age of five, in a role she wrote for her. Her mother's influence resulted in Edick studying acting as a teenager, and made Edick "fearless and gifted her with an ability to tell an attention-grabbing story", which influenced her life and ministry and informed her work for the rest of her life.

In 1882, Edick decided, against her mother's wishes, to become a reporter, and quickly became a "rising star" at the newspaper where she worked as a social reporter. She was assigned to cover religious revival meetings, writing accounts of humorous and miraculous occurrences. At one of the meetings she covered, she heard evangelist Peter Isaiah ("P. I.") Frey speak about his Christian faith and deliverance from alcohol. She later said that she felt attracted to him and "fell in love with him 'at first sight'". The next evening, she "experienced an encounter with God" and was converted to the Christian faith. She tried to leave the meeting without making a firm decision to become a Christian, but said that she was compelled by the voice of God to stay; as Fulthorp put it, she "ran to the altar in obedience and never turned back". Soon after her conversion, she accepted, against her mother's wishes, Frey's marriage proposal, viewing her marriage as a way to live out the Christian faith she lacked at home with her irreligious parents. Assemblies of God scholar Gerald W. King reported that her friends and family were "disappointed" about her conversion because "she gave up high society and focused her attention on evangelism". She attended a Bible college for two years and a Baptist seminary for three years.

== Career ==
Shortly after her conversion and marriage, Mae Frey quit her job as a reporter. According to Fulthorp, Frey's editor called her a fool, but she told him, "God will not let me continue". She also left her mainline church and worked in the City Mission, where she played the organ and "helped to lead souls to the altar". Mae and P. I. Frey, contrary to the conventions of the day, functioned outside traditional gender roles. They believed that God called them both into ministry. At first, they ministered during "cottage meetings" and despite their lack of experience, received requests to hold revivals; he preached about his conversion and she "worked the altars".

The Freys attracted large crowds wherever they went; in one of their early tent revivals, over 2000 people were converted to Christianity. Mae Frey later wrote about one of the revivals, the effects of which were felt for decades: "People in all the walks of life were saved. Society women, clubmen, rich and poor knelt together at the same altar and gave themselves to Jesus. Hundreds of children were saved, and crowds poured into the Sunday Schools". Mae Frey initially doubted the validity of female preachers because she had never seen a woman preach, but she was asked to give sermons at their meetings. The minister who organized a meeting in Pennsylvania in 1901 insisted, despite Frey's reluctance and nervousness that she preach because the dean and students at a local Baptist school were coming solely to hear a woman preach. Fulthorp reported that about 50 students were converted to Christianity. Mae Frey continued to preach at revivals until her death at the age of 89. Both P. I. and Mae Frey were ordained in the Baptist church. She resisted ordination at first, but in 1905, at the age of 40, she became the first woman to be ordained in the Northern Baptist Convention (now the American Baptist Churches USA).

Frey served as pastor and assistant pastor of congregations in New York and Pennsylvania, and was the pastor, with P. I. Frey, of Echo Lake Baptist Church in West Milford, New Jersey, from 1918 to 1920, receiving either equal or higher pay than male preachers, despite the conventions at the time and her growing dissatisfaction with her preaching and spiritual life. Frey also became a military chaplain and nurse late in World War I, doing volunteer hospital work with the Red Cross while maintaining her regular preaching duties. She became seriously ill with tuberculosis at the time of her ordination, continuing to preach despite severe symptoms and not being able to find treatment. Close to death due to a hemorrhage, a friend sent for George Davis, a Christian and Missionary Alliance pastor, who prayed for her and anointed her with oil. She experienced instantaneous healing; she later reported that she was "completely and miraculously healed" and required no more medications for 18 years.

Frey's spiritual and vocational dissatisfaction brought her to a meeting at a Pentecostal church to listen to W. I. Evans, a guest preacher from Newark, during a period of Pentecostal revival that occurred during the 1920s and resulted in "the cross-pollination" of the Baptist and Pentecostal denominations. It was her first exposure to the doctrine of the baptism with the Holy Spirit, including the practice of speaking in tongues. According to Frey, she resisted the experience as much as she had fought her ordination, but during a convention in Newark where she was invited to speak, "she had a personal revelation" that "turned her heart toward Pentecostalism". Fulthorp said that the experience "changed the trajectory of her life and ministry". Frey's husband had a similar experience shortly afterwards, and after a year and a half, she resigned from her pastorate at Echo Lake Baptist Church. Frey joined the Assemblies of God (AG) Church and by the fall of 1920, she and P. I. Frey traveled across the U.S. and Canada as evangelists. According to King, she did most of the preaching and "was particularly adept at communicating to fellow Baptists". Mae Frey sought ordination in the AG church, 14 years before it changed its bylaws and constitution to allow the ordination of women in 1935, and held evangelist credentials with the AG from 1921 until her death in 1954.

In 1924, Frey made her first trip overseas, traveling to Greece, Spain, Great Britain, Italy, France, Turkey, Egypt, and Palestine. When she returned to the U.S., as reported in many newspaper accounts, she gave lectures to large crowds about her travels. Frey briefly was the editor of a monthly periodical called The Gospel Highway. King reported that in 1924, Frey was "'kidnapped' by the Ku Klux Klan and 'forced' to preach a sermon to their members". The Klan requested that she join the organization as a speaker, but she refused, recognizing that despite its claims, it was not a Christian organization. After Frey's husband's death in 1928, she was able to travel more; for the next nine years, she preached all over the U.S. and Canada, mostly at mainline and Pentecostal churches, and even once at the Mormon Tabernacle in Salt Lake City, Utah.

In 1937, Frey was granted a temporary pastorate in Watertown, New York, before returning to full-time evangelism, which gave her time to write her first novel, The Minister, in 1939. Fulthorp called it "innovative" and "an extension of her ministry"; using narrative fiction and her own experiences as a female minister to teach Pentecostal doctrines, Frey intertwined her theology and beliefs into the book's plot and characters. In 1943, while pastoring Bethel Full Gospel Church in Rochester, New York, she published her second novel, Altars of Brick, with the established Christian publishing house Eerdmans. Like The Minister, Altars of Brick used narrative fiction to present the ethical and theological issues of her time, and to attack modernism.

== Legacy ==
"God almighty is no fool—I say it with all reverence—would He fill a woman with the Holy Ghost—endow her with ability—give her a vision of souls and then tell her to shut her mouth?" - Mae Eleanor Frey, 1928

Mae Eleanor Frey, according to Fulthorp, "helped establish a place for women in leadership within Pentecostal and Baptist circles". Much like her contemporary Aimee Semple McPherson, founder of the Foursquare Church, she also "faced the challenges of a woman in ministry with tenacity". Frey made significant contributions and had a mark on American religion at a time when it was difficult to be a female minister, all while balancing career and ministry, health challenges, and family obligations. She wrote that she detested denominationalism and was torn between Pentecostal teachings about the baptism with the Holy Spirit and the freedom she experienced when she conducted revivals for other denominations and as a Baptist minister.

In 1995, Pentecostal historian Edith Blumhofer compiled Frey's letters to AG leaders, written between 1924 and 1950; Blumhofer called them "revealing glimpses into various facets of American Pentecostalism" and historian Joy E. A. Qualls called Frey's letters "a revealing look at the life of an early pioneer of Pentecostal ministry in the United States". Her letters describe her experiences with male pastors, her frustration with church policy, her encounters with the Ku Klux Klan and local ministers, and her dependence on advice from leaders of the AG movement, who publicly endorsed her work during a time when the denomination's constitution and bylaws prohibited women from becoming pastors. Despite the AG's support of Frey's ministry, however, Qualls stated that the denomination's leadership demonstrated "an astonishing disregard for the challenging dynamic" of placing Frey in an area they knew would resist her ministry and which would openly challenge the church's official policy regarding women in ministry.

Frey's letters demonstrated her loyalty to the denomination, despite never being formally ordained by them, but also expressed her frustrations with the gender bias of her fellow ministers and revealed "wide disparities between doctrine and practice" for Pentecostal women in vocational ministry. In one of her letters, written to AG General Secretary J. R. Evans in 1928, she expressed the humiliation and exasperation she and other woman seeking ordination in the AG church experienced. Her letters also shaped the dialogue about the challenges women in religious leadership faced for decades and "inspired generations of men and women to put aside gender biases and diligently to do the divine work of God’s calling".

== Personal life ==
Frey was married in 1887. She and her husband P. I. Frey had two children, Stuart Wells Frey, who was born in 1889, and Catherine Elizabeth Frey, named after Mae Frey's mother, who they "unofficially" adopted 21 years later. Frey's intense ministry schedule and travel resulted in what Fulthorp called "family challenges". Frey, due to her husband's ill health, was often the sole wage-earner of her family and spent most of the year on the road, away from her family. Her daughter attended boarding school when she was a teenager due to her father's health and her mother's need to work and travel to support the family. Frey had two grandchildren; her granddaughter died at five months old in 1928 of kidney disease and pneumonia.

In 1924, the family had to settle in Glendale, California, due to P. I. Frey's failing health. Mae Frey looked for a pastorate in California, but was unable to find one, most likely because of the AG's prohibition of women in ministry. At the age of 63, Frey spent six months in Canada, where she preached twice a day, returning home to California in October 1928 to spend the holidays with her husband. P. I. Frey died, at the age of 68, on November 25, 1928. Qualls stated that his death prevented "a dramatic showdown on the role of women in pastoral ministry" and allowed Frey to continue in the "less controversial work of evangelism".

Frey continued to minister and preach well into her 80s, even after her retirement in September 1950, contributing to a retired minister's fund that she was eligible to use. She preached for the last time at a revival in Huntington, New York, at the age of 89. She died in Stamford, Connecticut, on December 4, 1954.

== Writings ==
- The Minister (1937). Springfield, Missouri: Gospel Publishing House.
- Altars of Brick (1943). Grand Rapids, Michigan: Eerdsmans Publishing House. ISBN 1417984295.
- "Selected Letters of Mae Eleanor Frey" (1995). Blumhofer, Edith L. (ed.). Pneuma: The Journal of the Society for Pentecostal Studies. 17 (1): 67–87.

== Works cited ==
- Frey, Mae Eleanor (1995). Blumhofer, Edith L. (ed.). "Selected Letters of Mae Eleanore Frey". Pneuma: The Journal of the Society for Pentecostal Studies. 17 (1): 67–87. doi:10.1163/157007495X00093.
- Fulthorp, Deborah L. (2020). "Mae Eleanor Frey: Early 20th-century Pentecostal Matriarch ". In Claiming Notability for Women Activists in Religion, Colleen D. Hartung, ed. Chicago: Atla Open Press, pp. 1–16. ISBN 978-1-949800-10-4. Retrieved May 22, 2021.
- King, Gerald W. (2009). "Mae Eleanor Frey, Pentecostal Evangelist and Novelist". Assemblies of God Heritage. 29: 57–62. Retrieved May 22, 2021.
- Qualls, Joy E. A. (2018). God Forgive Us for Being Women: Rhetoric, Theology, and the Pentecostal Tradition. Eugene, Oregon: Pickwick Publications. ISBN 1532602030.
