= Berlin Declaration =

Berlin Declaration may refer to one of the following declarations:

- Berlin Declaration on Education for Sustainable Development (2021)
- The Berlin Declaration on the Uniqueness of Christ and Jewish Evangelism in Europe Today, a theological declaration issued by the World Evangelical Alliance in 2008
- Berlin Declaration (2007) – signed on the 50th anniversary of the Treaty of Rome
- Berlin Declaration on Open Access to Knowledge in the Sciences and Humanities (2003)
- Berlin Declaration (1945) – "Declaration regarding the defeat of Germany and the assumption of supreme authority with respect to Germany by the Governments of the United States of America, the Union of Soviet Socialist Republics, the United Kingdom and the Provisional Government of the French Republic" ("de:Berliner Erklärung (Alliierte)")
- Berlin Declaration (1909) is a theological declaration condemning the Pentecostal movement
