= Mülheim Association of Free Churches and Evangelical Communities =

Mülheim Association of Free Churches and Evangelical Communities (in German: Mülheimer Verband Freikirchlich-Evangelischer Gemeinden, formerly Christlicher Gemeinschaftsverband Mülheim adRuhr/CGV) is a German Pentecostal fellowship.

== History ==
The German Pentecostal movement arose out of revival meetings held yearly by the Gnadauer Verband in the Ruhr area around the turn of the twentieth century. Many of the evangelical leaders visited and experienced Pentecostal charismata at the Thomas Barratt mission in Oslo from 1906-1907.

During the revival held in Mülheim in 1907 reportedly 3,000 conversions occurred over a six-week period, under the guidance of Emil Humburg. Sixty Lutheran leaders reacted to the Pentecostal manifestation and issued a condemnation, the Berlin Declaration in 1909.

The Pentecostal leaders Emil Humburg, Jonathan Paul, Eugen Edel, Octavious Voget continued to hold Pentecostal conferences, with an attendance of 1,700 in 1909 and 2,500 in 1910, drawing people from Germany, Switzerland, Netherlands, Hungary, Scandinavia, and Russia.

Soon disagreement made many leave the Mühlheimer Association to organize the Freie Pfingstgemeinden in 1911. In 1914 the Pentecostals led by Jonathan Paul were incorporated as the Christlicher Gemeinschaftsverband GmbH Mülheim/Ruhr, as a fellowship of members within the Lutheran, Reformed state churches as well as within the Free Churches. During the Nazi regime and the Second World War the Mühlheimer Association suffered pressure and lost many members. The movement experienced membership decline between 1960-1990.

== Organization ==
The Mülheimer Association is organized into local communities, with equality among members, presided by an ordained or lay leader acting as primus inter pares. Today there are 45 communities and 3,700 members, with some of them holding dual membership within State and Free churches.

Since 1981 the Mülheimer Association is a full member of the Association of Evangelical Free Churches (VEF) and since 2002 it is a member of the Association of Evangelical Free Church-Communities of Pentecostal Churches Forum (FFP Ret). Since 2007 the Mülheimer Association is a full member of the Christian Churches Council in Germany.

== Beliefs and praxis ==
The Mülheimer Association does not believe in tongues as initial evidence. It allows infant and adult baptism. It has a critical scholarship reading of the Bible, rejecting verbal, plenary inspiration doctrine.
