= Running the aisles =

Expression of worship

Running the aisles is an ecstatic expression of worship that occurs occasionally in some contexts of worship in the Pentecostal and Holiness movements in Christianity. As the expression suggests, when a person runs the aisles in a worship setting, they leaves their seat and run down the aisles between seating sections or run around the interior perimeter of the meeting house.

A biblical basis for the act known as running the aisles is difficult to establish. Nevertheless, in the Pentecostal worship tradition, spontaneous expressions inspired by the moving of the Spirit are highly valued, and in many congregations the spontaneous running of aisles has traditionally been an acceptable expression of joy. Typically those Pentecostals who run the church aisles do not do so unless they feel that they are overwhelmed by the presence of the Holy Spirit at a point in the service when the congregation in general is sensing His moving.

It may be reasonable to classify running as a form of dancing. Running occurs at times in modern Jewish folk dancing.

Opponents of this expression of worship argue that it violates Paul's instructions on orderly worship found in 1 Corinthians 14:26-40, as well as contradicting the idea that one of the "fruits" of the Holy Spirit is self-control (Galatians 5:23). At its basic level, however, opponents of such a belief hold a different view of the work of the Holy Spirit.
