= Edith L. Blumhofer =

American historian of religion

- Born: Edith Lydia Waldvogel; April 24, 1950; Brooklyn, New York, U.S.
- Died: March 5, 2020 (aged 69)
- Spouse: Edwin Blumhofer (m. 1975)

Academic background
- Education: Hunter College (BA, MA); Harvard University (PhD)
- Thesis: The "Overcoming" Life: A Study in the Reformed Evangelical Contribution to Pentecostalism (1977)
- Doctoral advisor: George Huntston Williams

Academic work
- Discipline: History of Christianity
- Sub-discipline: Evangelicalism; Pentacostalism; Hymnody; Christian revival
- Institutions: Wheaton College (Illinois)

Edith Lydia Waldvogel Blumhofer (April 24, 1950 – March 5, 2020) was an American historian of religion who focused on the history of American Pentecostalism.

Blumhofer earned both a Bachelor of Arts in history and Master of Arts in American history at Hunter College before going on to receive a doctorate in American religious history at Harvard University. Her scholarship focused on hymnody and American revivalism. She was a prolific researcher and writer throughout her working years as a professor. In addition to studies of church music she wrote biographies of Aimee Semple McPherson and Fanny J. Crosby. However, her seminal work was Restoring the faith: The Assemblies of God, Pentecostalism and American Culture which described the transition of Pentecostalism from a millenarian sect to a global movement of megachurches driven by sophisticated communications technology.

Blumhofer was regarded as a bridge-builder between evangelicalism and Pentecostalism through her institutional leadership. In 1987 as president of the Society for Pentecostal Studies, Blumhofer helped further inspire and propel the neglected study of this branch of evangelicalism, into the mainstream. In 1987, she was project leader and then director of the newly created Wheaton Institute for the Study of American Evangelicals. In the 1990s she was Associate Director of the Pew-funded Public Religion Project, which analyzes religious change and its impact on societies around the world.

== Perspective and values ==
Blumhofer rejected the compensation narrative that suggested Pentecostalism attracted the poor and dispossessed as a sop for despair, and she was equally critical of hagiographic representations of early Pentecostal leaders, many of whom faced scandals and censures as they embraced controversial practices, such as faith healing and deliverance as well as fringe theologies. She taught her students to write transparently about the flaws of Christian leaders rather than entering into the debates and politics of spiritual failure. In her writing she gave thorough accounts of failed millenarian movements and described how world events generally eclipsed the expect return of Christ. Blumhofer also documented the Assemblies of God debates from 1918 that made glossolalia (speaking in tongues) the normative evidence for the Baptism in the Holy Spirit, the defining experience of Pentecostalism.

With Grant Wacker and Joe Creech, Blumhofer contested the centrality of the Azusa Street Mission Revival to the rise and spread of global pentecostalisms. In an article marking the centennial of the Revival, Blumhofer asserted, "Azusa Street has a place in the story of how contemporary Christianity came to be, but its story is but one piece in the narrative of exploding charismatic Christianity, not its prototype." This view proved controversial; Wacker opined that purported "black origins" of the movement were "presentist-driven" and not proven. In 2014, historian Gaston Espinosa argued that Wacker, Blumhofer, and Creech had in fact written white origins for the movement and that, in doing so, they denied William J. Seymour, widely considered the Black father of American Pentecostalism, his rightful place as progenitor of the movement.

== Publications ==
Select works:

- Aimee Semple McPherson : everybody's sister, 1993. ISBN 978-0-8028-0155-5.
- Restoring the faith : the Assemblies of God, pentecostalism, and American culture, 1993. ISBN 978-0-252-06281-0.
- Pentecostal currents in American Protestantism, 1999. ISBN 978-0-252-06756-3.
- Her heart can see : the life and hymns of Fanny J. Crosby, 2005. ISBN 978-0-8028-4253-4.
- "PASSAGES: Remembering the Life and Legacy of Edith L. Blumhofer (1950-1920)," Fides et Historia 52, no. 2 (Summer/Fall) 2020:92-95
