= Berlin Declaration (1909) =

The Berlin declaration (German: Berliner Erklärung) was a theological statement by 56 leading Evangelic theologians in Germany. The declaration condemns the German Pentecostal movement which had started two years earlier in Kassel. It stated that the Pentecostal movement was “not from above, but from below”. The declaration specifically mentions Jonathan Paul as the movement's leader, but it is not clear that Jonathan Paul saw himself as such. The declaration was formally revoked by the Gnadauer Gemeinschaftsverbandes in a statement of January 2009. This move is seen a major step toward reconciliation between Pentecostals and non-Pentecostal churches in Germany.
