= Jonathan Paul =

Jonathan Anton Alexander Paul (1853–1931) was a German Pentecostal minister, writer, theologian, and Bible scholar and translator.

Paul graduated from the Studium der Theologie in the University of Greifswald and pastored in Pomerania. He was member of the Gnadauer Verband, an evangelical movement within the Evangelical Church in Germany and supported youth activities, social ministry among workers, and pietistic conversion.

In 1906, Jonathan Paul visited Thomas Ball Barratt in Oslo and became Pentecostal. The German evangelical leadership condemned Pentecostalism in the Berlin Declaration in 1909 and as a consequence Paul helped to organize the Mülheim Association of Free Churches and Evangelical Communities, the first Pentecostal body in Germany in 1914, a fellowship gathering Pentecostals within the state and free churches.

He was a very active writer, editor of many periodicals, and compiler of the hymnal Pfingstjubel. Paul and five other Pentecostals published in 1914 the Das Neue Testament in der Sprache der Gegenwart, a then-contemporary German language version of the New Testament.

Jonathan Paul and the German Pentecostalism held doctrines different from their American counterparts. Paul did not believe in tongues as initial evidence, nor in the doctrine of two or three stages of salvation – rebirth, sanctification, baptism in the Holy Spirit. Regarding the Bible Paul, an accomplished Bible-scholar, rejected the fundamentalist views such as the idea verbal inspiration.
