= Pentecostal Churches of the Apostolic Faith =

Oneness Pentecostal denomination

Pentecostal Churches of the Apostolic Faith International
- Classification: Protestant
- Orientation: Oneness Pentecostal
- Polity: Episcopal
- Presiding Bishop: Lambert W. Gates
- Headquarters: 723 S. 45th Street Louisville, Kentucky
- Origin: 1957; Detroit
- Separated from: Pentecostal Assemblies of the World
- Absorbed: Apostolic Church Assemblies of Africa (1959)
- Separations: Emmanuel Pentecostal Churches of the Apostolic Faith (1964); Apostolic Assemblies of Christ (1970); The True Churches of the Apostolic Faith (1974)
- Congregations: 851 (2025)
- Members: 30,000+ (2025)
- Seminaries: Bell Apostolic Bible College
- Publications: The Voice
- Official website: pcafintl.org

Pentecostal Churches of the Apostolic Faith International, Inc., (PCAFI), founded as Pentecostal Churches of the Apostolic Faith Association (PCAF), is a Oneness Pentecostal Christian denomination headquartered in Louisville, Kentucky, United States. It was founded in 1957 by former members of the Pentecostal Assemblies of the World (PAW) after disputes between Bishop Samuel Hancock and PAW leadership.

== History ==
=== Background ===
Samuel Nathan Hancock was born November 9, 1883, in Columbia, Kentucky. His family moved to Indianapolis when he was 5. In 1914 he joined Garfield Thomas Haywood's congregation Christ Temple Apostolic Faith Assembly, and in 1915 was rebaptized there under Jesus's name. In 1921, he moved to Detroit and started serving as pastor for the Greater Bethlehem Temple Church there. In 1927, he was appointed as a bishop in the Pentecostal Assemblies of the World. In 1931, Haywood died, and it was agreed that no presiding bishop would be appointed for a year after out of respect. Also in 1931, the majority-black PAW voted to merge with the majority-white Apostolic Church of Jesus Christ to form the Pentecostal Assemblies of Jesus Christ, although a small contingent of ministers led by Bishop Samuel Grimes maintained the PAW Charter. In 1938, Hancock rejoined PAW, as had most black PAJC members after it hosted its General Convention in segregated Tulsa, Oklahoma the year prior.

=== Rifts in PAW ===
During his time in PAW, Hancock came into conflict in matters of Christology and leadership. In 1940, he was accused of teaching that Jesus was only the son of God and not God, though he was exonerated in 1943. He also published the short book The Great Godhead, which stated that Jesus was not God, only the subordinate son of God, in pre-existence. These teachings lead to the convening of a special meeting of the PAW Executive Board in 1955, in which Hancock and the rest of the board signed an affirmation of Oneness Christology.

In addition to his Christological disagreements, Hancock also believed that he, not Grimes, should have succeeded Haywood as Presiding Bishop of PAW. He argued one-year delay in hiring a new bishop after Haywood's death gave time for a camp to organize against him. At the 1952 General Assembly in Baltimore, Grimes won a runoff vote to become Presiding Bishop over Hancock. The leadership dispute is considered to be the primary cause of Hancock leaving the church.

=== Formation of PCAF ===
On November 20, 1957, Bishops Samuel Hancock, Herdie Leaston, and Willie Lee, and Elder David Collins left PAW to form the Pentecostal Churches of the Apostolic Faith; Hancock had repeatedly threatened to leave prior. Hancock continued to preach his atypical Christology, but PCAF did not require adherence to it. Today, PCAF professes standard Oneness Christology.

In late 1959, leaders of Apostolic Church Assemblies of Africa (ACAA), a Liberian, predominantly Bassa Oneness Pentecostal denomination established in 1947, and the predominantly Kru Liberian PAW wrote to PCAF requesting that they send a delegation to their annual convocation in December, seeking the leadership and resources of a foreign ministry. PCAF accepted their offer, and just a week later, Presiding Bishop Hancock and Vice Presiding Bishop Lee attended the convocation at the Burning Bush Tabernacle on 25th Lynch Street Monrovia, Liberia. During the convocation, Hancock agreed to accept ACAA into PCAF and ACAA adopted the PCAF name. On December 5, Hancock appointed Abraham T. Simmons as Presiding Bishop for the new church.

=== Schisms ===
Samuel Hancock died on August 18, 1963, and was succeeded as Presiding Bishop by Willie Lee. Lee agreed with Hancock's Christological views which, though tolerated over Hancock's lifetime, caused great controversy under Lee. In 1964, the majority of congregations split off, recognizing previous Assistant Presiding Bishop Elzie Young as Presiding Bishop. The PCAF name was used by both the Lee and Young led denominations for four years, until the Lee group adopted the name Pentecostal Churches of the Apostolic Faith, Inc., International Assemblies; Young's group kept the charter and became the modern PCAFI. The Lee group at some point adopted the name Emmanuel Pentecostal Churches of the Apostolic Faith; he died on June 19, 1969, and was succeeded by James Stewart of Danville, Illinois, as Presiding Bishop. A separate group of churches that left after Hancock's death organized as the Apostolic Assemblies of Christ in 1970, headed by former PCAF bishop George Marshall Boone.

In May 1974, PCAF founding member David Collins formed the True Churches of the Apostolic Faith to preserve what he saw as Hancock's teachings. Collins espoused an unusual adoptionist Christology, in which all of humankind, including Jesus, pre-existed as the "seed" (either metaphorical or literal) of Adam, with Jesus only becoming Son of God inside Mary, and at no point being God himself.

=== Later history ===
Elzie Young held the post of Presiding Bishop until his death on December 27, 1989. He instituted a system payments by local churches to the national body based on a percentage of church income; over his tenure, PCAF went from having $5 in its treasury to over $1,000,000.

In January 1975, PCAF established the Midwest Apostolic Bible College in Maywood, Illinois. After four years, it was moved to Chicago, and later it was renamed to D.R. Bell Apostolic Bible College.

== Presiding bishops ==
1. Samuel Nathan Hancock, 1957–1963
2. Wililam Matthew Lee, 1963–1964
3. Elzie William Young, 1964–1989
4. Dennis Rayford Bell, 1990–2000
5. Alfred Singleton, 2000–2008
6. J.E. Moore, 2008–2016
7. Lambert Wade Gates Sr., 2016–present
