= List of Pentecostal denominations =

List of Pentecostal denominations. Many of these denominations are members of the Pentecostal World Fellowship. In North America, there is also an interdenominational organization called The Pentecostal/Charismatic Churches of North America (PCCNA). There is also a separate Nontrinitarian group of Pentecostal churches commonly called Oneness Pentecostal churches, but because of their differing views on the Trinity, they are generally categorized separately from Trinitarian Pentecostal and Full Gospel churches. Many of the membership numbers below are reported by the denominations themselves, and as such they should be considered approximate. Also, the list itself should not be considered comprehensive because there are many small denominations which are below 100,000 in membership, and individual churches which chose not to affiliate with other denominations.

== List of Trinitarian Pentecostal denominations ==
- Assemblies of God – 85,393,883
- Apostolic Church – 15 million
- Open Bible Churches - .15 million
- Foursquare Church - 8.8 million
- Church of God (Cleveland, Tennessee) - 7 million
- Church of God in Christ - 6.5 million
- Church of Pentecost – 3.9 million
- Christian Congregation of Brazil – 2.8 million
- The Pentecostal Mission – 2.5 million
- International Pentecostal Holiness Church – 2 million
- Universal Church of the Kingdom of God – 2 million
- Church of God of Prophecy – 1.5 million
- Apostolic Faith Mission of South Africa – 1.4 million
- Jesus Is Lord Church Worldwide – 1 million
- Indian Pentecostal Church of God – 0.9 million
- God is Love Pentecostal Church – 0.8 million
- Pentecostal Church of God – .6 million
- The Fellowship Network – .4 million
- Manna Full Gospel Churches – .3 million
- International Fellowship of Christian Assemblies – .2 million
- The Redeemed Evangelical Mission - 40,000
- Elim Fellowship
- Elim Pentecostal Church
- Unified Pentecostal Local Church International Inc.

== List of Oneness Pentecostal churches ==
- United Pentecostal Church International* 5.8m
- Apostolic World Christian Fellowship*
- Jesus Miracle Crusade*
- Pentecostal Assemblies of the World*
- Pentecostal Churches of Christ*
- Assemblies of the Lord Jesus Christ*
- Pentecostal Assemblies of Jesus Christ
- Apostolic Church of Jesus Christ
- Church of Our Lord Jesus Christ*
- Evangelical Christians-Sabbatarians baptized by the Holy Spirit (Ukraina)
- Independent*
- World Pentecostal Fellowship*

== Sources ==
- Burgess, Stanley M.; Maas, Eduard M. van der, eds. (2002). The New International Dictionary of Pentecostal and Charismatic Movements (Rev. and exp. ed.). Grand Rapids, Mi: Zondervan. ISBN 978-0-310-22481-5.
