= David K. Bernard Library =

- 38.80806478928238°N 90.82993731349255°W,
- Location: 155 Urshan Way, Wentzville, Missouri
- Type: Academic library

Collection
- Items collected: Theological, biblical, and religious resources
- Size: 40,000

Access and use
- Access requirements: Students and staff

Other information
- Director: Gary Erickson
- Parent organization: Urshan University and Urshan Graduate School of Theology
- Affiliation: United Pentecostal Church International
- Website: dkbl.library.site

The David K. Bernard Library is an academic library that supports the faculty, staff, and students of Urshan Graduate School of Theology and Urshan University. It is named after the General Superintendent of the UPCI and first president of Urshan, Dr. David K. Bernard.

Collection development began with the acquisition of the personal library of Ernest E. Jolley, a United Pentecostal Church International minister. Rev Jolley's library was donated to Gateway College of Evangelism and consisted of almost ten thousand volumes. This donation was cataloged and shelved in one of the large classrooms. A major shift in the library took place in 2001 when the Urshan Graduate School of Theology began operation. Intentional acquisition of material relevant to the curriculum and research of the school's professional staff became a top priority. Over 5,000 square feet (460 m^{2}) of floor space was remodeled and designed for library use. The library now consists of approximately 40,000 holdings with 30,000 titles. Future development will broaden to other formats but printed manuscript is the preferred medium for present development.

Major renovations and expansion are scheduled as the collection grows to 60,000 holdings. The library was reviewed by the Association of Theological Schools (ATS) in 2008 for accreditation.

The David K. Bernard Library maintains membership in the American Theological Library Association (ATLA), and the St. Louis Regional Library Network (SLRLN). It also has access to online digital resources through EBSCOhost and MOREnet.
