= Bernie L. Wade =

American minister, entrepreneur, and author

Bernie L. Wade, born on June 29, 1963, in Lakewood, Ohio, is an American minister, entrepreneur, and author. He has served in a variety of roles, including senior pastor and chief operations officer of the Christian Brotherhood (a 28,000 family parachurch ministry with multiple divisions). He also served as president of CWN (Christian World Network), and vice-president of Spread the Spirit of Love.

He is currently the Presiding Bishop of the International Circle of Faith (ICOF), a group of non-denominational, Oneness Pentecostal ministers, churches, and parachurch ministries. They were first organized in Cleveland and are currently headquartered in Washington, D.C.

The International Circle of Faith traces its beginning to the Azusa Street movement or revival (circa 1906) through the Pentecostal Assemblies of Jesus Christ. Other aspects of his ministry include the ICOF Colleges and Seminaries – a network of Christian bible colleges, Christian Leadership Roundtable – a group of Christian leaders, and Children of Azusa Street – a network for persons who trace their church history to the Azusa Street movement.

== Family history ==
Wade has Sir William Wade (Waad), a member of Queen Elizabeth I's Privy Council, for his paternal ancestor (See also: Armagil Waad) and Scottish immigrants of the Clan Macpherson for his maternal ancestors. The Wades are an ancient Yorkshire family.

The Wade family served in various capacities to both King Henry VIII and Queen Elizabeth I The most famous Wade was Armagil Wade who historians call the "English Columbus". The Wades came to America before the American Revolution and settled in Virginia. They were shareholders in the Virginia Colony. Bernie Wade is a descendant of the Wade family of Virginia whose family offered such valiant sons of the American Revolution as Captain Edmond Wade who fell with his commander, General Montgomery, at the siege of Quebec.

== Education ==
Wade's educational accomplishments include PhDs from Evangelical Theological Seminary in Dallas, Texas, ICOF Colleges and Universities – Washington, D.C., and Global Evangelical Christian College in Montgomery, Alabama. Wade serves as chancellor of the network of colleges and seminaries known as ICOF Colleges and Seminaries. Wade holds doctorates in theology, divinity, Christian education, non-profit management and pastoral counseling. He also serves as advisor to other Christian education institutions and organizations including serving as international advisor to Global Evangelical Accrediting Association. He serves as adjunct faculty and board member to Global Evangelical Christian College.

== Politics ==
In recent years, Bernie L. Wade has been a guest at the White House (March 2004) under the presidency of George W. Bush. "In late March, at a less publicized gathering, the National Security Council's Near East and North African Affairs director, Elliott Abrams, and other Bush administration officials met for two hours with members of The Apostolic Congress, a politically powerful group of Christian fundamentalists, to reassure them that the administration's support for Israel was unwavering." The Apostolic Congress is made up of the heads of oneness pentecostal (sometimes called Apostolic) organizations and their key leaders. Dr. Bernie L. Wade is considered one of these as the Presiding Bishop of the International Circle of Faith. Although the ICOF Statement of Faith makes no claim to be oneness. Also in the meeting were representatives of Bishop Norman Wagner (PAW), Reverend Kenneth Haney (UPCI) and others who led Apostolic organizations. Apostolic Coalition is a pro-Israel conservative messianic political action committee.

== Endorsement ==
Wade's endorsement, or the endorsement of the ICOF, has been sought by other national candidates in the US and abroad, including Hillary Clinton and Mike Huckabee for the 2008 Presidential primaries. The official policy of ICOF, who Wade represents, has been not to take political sides or to offer endorsements.

Also there is a concerted effort to encourage Republican Sarah Palin to seek the presidential nomination.

== Early ministry ==
In 1982, Wade began fulfilling his call to the ministry as a youth minister for Apostolic Faith Church of God headquartered in Cleveland, Ohio. Wade first served at the Columbia Station location, then in St. Paul Minnesota and Cleveland Ohio. Apostolic Faith Church of God was founded in 1932 by Bishop Ray O. Cornell (founding bishop of the PAJC).

== Bishop ==
International Circle of Faith (ICOF) is a 21st-century movement. This global, multiracial, multi-cultural, nondenominational fellowship has some 40,000 ministers. They also have a network of over 100 bible colleges, universities and seminaries under International Circle of Faith Colleges and Seminaries. Today ICOF has a presence in over 100 countries and key leadership in over 50 countries.

== Books ==
- Baptism According to Matthew 28:19
- Is Christmas Christian?
- Does God Have a Name?
- Frankenstein Church
- I was the Ugly Duckling

== Apostle ==
Wade is part of a growing group of leaders recognized by groups such as the ICA (International Coalition of Apostles) as emergent, Pentecostals and charismatics called Apostles. “An apostle is a Christian leader gifted, taught, and commissioned by God with the authority to establish the foundational government of the church within an assigned sphere of ministry by hearing what the Spirit is saying to the churches and by setting things in order accordingly for the extension of the kingdom of God."

He was formerly the senior pastor of Barberton Rescue Mission's The Chapel on Taylor Road, and senior pastor of Church in the Warehouse ( Cleveland, Ohio ). He also served as secretary and past president of Victory Foundation, vice-president of marketing for CBN (Christian Brotherhood Newsletter), COO of the Barberton Rescue Mission, CEO of Christian World Network (CWN).
