= Howard A. Goss =

North American Pentecostal pastor

Howard Archibald Goss (1883–1964) was a North American Oneness Pentecostal pastor and evangelist. He became the first superintendent of the United Pentecostal Church International, after it was formed from the merger of two Oneness Pentecostal organizations. Previously, he had been an original member of the Assemblies of God, until he left it after it strongly affirmed the Trinitarian position.

== Early life and Conversion ==
Goss was born in Steelville, Missouri in 1883. In 1898 his father moved his family to Galena, Kansas. Goss converted to Christianity in high school in 1902, when Evangelist Charles Parham arrived in Galena and began preaching the new Apostolic Faith, known now was the Pentecostal message. Goss claims to owe his conversion to listening to people speak in tongues. After his conversion, he dedicated his life to serving God.

Upon graduating high school, Goss went to Houston to attend Parham's Bible School. When the term ended, Goss received his first leadership position for the revival in Angleton, which was deemed as a success. Although at this time he was able to understand tongues, he was unable to speak it himself. While in Houston working at Brunner Tabernacle when Lucy Farrow, an African-American preacher, who had just returned from the Azusa Street revival, prayed for him and he spoke in tongues again. From that time forward he was "able to speak in tongues at any time I yielded to the Spirit of God."

== Career ==
By 1907, Goss and the majority of the Apostolic Faith Movement broke with Parham. Shortly after, Goss and his first wife Millicent preached revivals around Texas and eventually Arkansas. It was in Arkansas that Goss did his prime ministry, this state became the center of the movement populated by the remnants of the Apostolic Faith group. Arkansas was also the place they began to refer to themselves as "Pentecostals" instead of "Apostolic Faith Group" in order to disaffiliate with controversial scandals associated with Parham. In the fall of 1909 Goss and his wife settled in Malvern Arkansas which became his focal point during this time and they experiences great success in their revivals. After the death of Millicent, Goss resided in Malvern where he hosted a camp meeting. Soon after Goss accepted the message of William Durham regarding the finished work, a controversial topic at the Malvern camp. Goss traveled and did many tent revivals including an inter-state camp meeting in Eureka Springs, Arkansas, where he met his second wife Ethel Wright. The newlyweds entered itinerant evangelistic work and would go on to have six children.

The attempted measures for cooperation between ministers and churches that had developed after the collapse of Parham's Apostolic Faith movement in 1907 were deemed insufficient. Goss and the remnants of the Apostolic Faith group brokered a "gentleman's agreement" with this group to become the Churches of God in Christ. December 20, 1913 issue of Word and Witness contained a call for an exploratory meeting for a new organization to be held in April 1914 in Hot Springs, Arkansas. The call listed five purposes for the new organization. This meeting was the birthplace of the Assemblies of God, which would go on to become the largest Pentecostal organization in the world.

R.E. McAlister gave his message held at the camp meeting, stating that the apostles baptized their converts once in the name of Jesus, this became known as "The New Issue." It was from this message that the Oneness Movement was launched. The heated debate over the New Issue raged within the Assemblies of God; however, opponents of the message quickly brought it to a head and an eventual parting of the ways. Goss fully embraced the Oneness position at a time when the leadership of the new organization was determined to deal decisively on the New Issue. Over the strong objections of the Oneness adherents, the council accepted the Statement of Fundamental Truths, which strongly affirmed the Trinitarian position and rejected the Oneness view. As a result, the Oneness proponents were forced out of the fellowship. Goss being one of the people kicked out, got involved with the Pentecostal Assemblies of Canada (PAOC). Goss resigned his Toronto congregation in 1937. Goss became involved with what may have been his most challenging organizational work, the merger of the Pentecostal Church Incorporated (PCI) and the Pentecostal Assemblies of Jesus Christ (PA of JC). September 25, 1945, the two organizations officially became one. Howard Goss was the nearly unanimous choice for general superintendent.
