= Indiana Bible College =

Bible college in Indiana, USA

Coordinates: 39°43′0″N 86°7′58″W

- Type: Private college, Bible college
- Established: 1981; 45 years ago
- Founder: Rev. Dennis Croucher
- Religious affiliation: Oneness Pentecostal, United Pentecostal Church International
- President: Joshua B. Carson
- Dean: Jennifer L. Mast
- Executive Vice President: Justin Reinking
- Location: Indianapolis, Indiana, US
- Colors: Red and black
- Website: indianabible.college

Indiana Bible College (IBC) is a oneness Christian Bible college located in Indianapolis, Indiana, United States. It is endorsed by the United Pentecostal Church International (UPCI).

== Overview ==
Founded in 1981 by Rev. Dennis Croucher of Seymour, Indiana, United States, it relocated to Indianapolis in 1988 under Pastor Paul Mooney and Calvary Tabernacle of Indianapolis, Indiana.

The campus is at the former University Heights Hospital at 1502 East Sumner Avenue site, 1 km from University Heights.

== Academics ==
Indiana Bible College (IBC) focuses on preparing students for careers in professional ministry. The college offers Associate of Arts and Bachelor of Arts programs in Biblical Studies, Christian Leadership, Missiology, and Worship Studies with academic minors in the same. Concentrations include studies in education, church marketing, counseling, and preaching. IBC provides leadership across the United Pentecostal Church International in every area of church ministry. It offers on-site courses, night classes, a large External Studies program, and Spanish course offerings at the main campus.

Indiana Bible College is not an accredited institution, nor is it pursuing accreditation. However, IBC credits routinely transfer to multiple graduate schools (e.g., Urshan Graduate School of Theology, the accredited seminary of the UPCI, accepts degrees from IBC because their accrediting agency considers IBC equivalent to an accredited institution).

== Campus life ==
Students are able to participate in different organizations. The library has around 20,000 volumes, a book room, and students can access scholarly and practical periodicals.

== Leadership ==
As of August 2025, the leadership of Indiana Bible College is as follows:

- President: Joshua B. Carson
- Executive Vice President: Justin Reinking
- Campus Pastor / Dean of Students: Jarred Turner
- Executive Pastor: Juan Lopez

=== Deans ===
- Dean of Academics: Jennifer Mast
- Dean of Biblical Studies: Andrew Herbst
- Dean of Christian Leadership: Chris Henderson
- Dean of Missiology: Bobby Killmon
- Dean of Worship Studies: Timothy Hall
