= Urshan =

Urshan may refer to:

== People ==
- Andrew David Urshan (1884-1967), a Persian-born Assyrian evangelist and author.
- Shamiram Urshan (1938–2011), also known as Shamiram Ourshan, an Assyrian singer.

== Other ==
- Urshan University, Christian College in Florissant, Missouri.
- Urshan Graduate School of Theology, a college.
