= First Pentecostal Church of North Little Rock =

Oneness Pentecostal church

First Pentecostal Church of Jesus Christ, Inc.
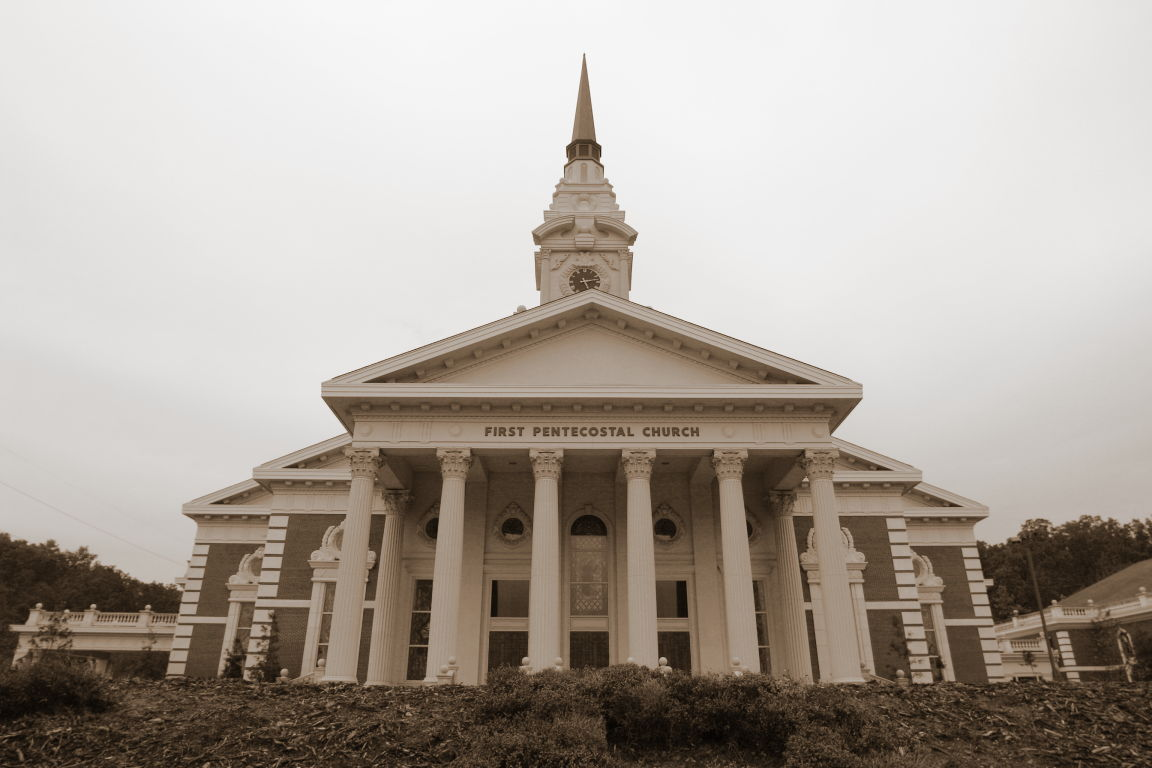
- The church pictured in 2004.
- First Pentecostal Church of Jesus Christ, Inc.
- 34.7815°N 92.2523°W
- Address: 1401 Calvary Rd, North Little Rock, AR
- Country: United States
- Denomination: Independent
- Tradition: Oneness Pentecostal
- Website: www.fpcnlr.com

Architecture
- Functional status: Active
- Architect: Michael R. Hahn
- Style: Beaux Arts
- Years built: 2000—2003
- Groundbreaking: 14 February 1999
- Completed: November 2003
- Construction cost: $13 million

Specifications
- Capacity: 2,875

Clergy
- Bishop: Joel Holmes
- Pastor: Nathan Holmes

First Pentecostal Church of North Little Rock (FPCNLR) is an independent Oneness Pentecostal megachurch located in North Little Rock, Arkansas. The church building seats 2,875, and the assembled congregation can reach up to 4,500 during large events.

== History ==
FPCNLR began in the late 1930s, initially meeting in a storefront on East Washington Street with a small group of 20 Pentecostal believers. Under the leadership of A.O. Holmes, who became pastor in 1946, the congregation grew, moving to a two-story house at Second and Buckeye, where they later built a church in 1949. After a fire destroyed the building in 1970, the church built a new building in Park Hill, where they stayed for 22 years. In 1998, the congregation purchased ten acres on Interstate 40, where they eventually constructed and moved into a new sanctuary on November 22, 1992. In the late 1990s, the church drew up plans for a major building expansion. Building began in 2000, and the new facility was completed in November 2003. Its first service was on Easter Sunday, April 11, 2004, and they have remained in that location until today. The church is pastored by Nathan Holmes, with his father (the son of A.O. Holmes), Joel Holmes, serving as bishop.

== Beliefs ==
As a Oneness Pentecostal church, FPCNLR adheres to Oneness Pentecostal doctrines, particularly emphasizing the necessity of repentance, water baptism in the name of Jesus, and receiving the Holy Spirit with the evidence of speaking in tongues. The church also emphasizes holiness, both in personal lifestyle and worship practices, maintaining traditional Oneness Pentecostal values. The church is not affiliated with any particular Oneness Pentecostal organization, remaining independent.

== Campus and facilities ==
FPCNLR is situated on a 175-acre campus at the junction of I-30 and I-40. The $13 million main sanctuary, completed in 2004, features a seating capacity of 2,875 people, with seating for larger events being expanded to 4,500. The campus also contains a chapel with 280 seats and the $7 million former sanctuary that now houses church offices and the church's school.

=== Architecture ===
The building was designed by architect Michael R. Hahn and built by Matson Construction, while the stained glass was done by IHS Studios. The building is in the Beaux Arts style. Distinct features of the building include a 193 ft. steeple, a 69,000 sq. ft. sanctuary made of marble (including 2,000-year-old stone from Jerusalem), a 3,364 sq. ft. rotunda, a 75 ft. high dome with 2,400 sq. ft. of stained glass, an additional 4,500 sq. ft. of stained glass throughout the facility, and a 25 ft. statue of the angel Gabriel lofted in the main sancutuary.

== Events ==
=== I AM Easter production ===
I AM is FPCNLR's biennial Easter production, performed in various forms since 2014. The show features a cast of 500 adults and children, a 50-person choir, live animals, and special effects. The script is based on the English Standard Version of the gospel of John, with music recorded by Prague Philharmonic Orchestra serving as part of the show's soundtrack, alongside live music. In 2024, the production was attended by roughly 20,000 people across all showings. In 2026, there were 13 performances, including one in Spanish.

=== Arkansas International Camp Meeting ===
Arkansas International Camp Meeting (ARICM) is a yearly camp meeting hosted by FPCNLR since 1948. Previous meetings have been attended by upwards of 4,500 people. In 2018, the conference hosted a live recording to commemorate the 70th ARICM.

=== All Nations Sunday ===
Since 2021, the church has held an annual All Nations Sunday to recognize the "different nationalities, cultures, and ethnicities" in the church. The event is open to the public and features free ethnic food and a concert. Participants often wear clothing corresponding to the nation they represent. In 2022, the event was attended by 1,500 people.

=== Funeral of Patrick Henry Hays ===
In 2023, the memorial service of former mayor and Arkansas House of Representatives member Pat Hays was held at FPCNLR. The service was attended by over 1,000 friends and family, and speakers included North Little Rock Mayor Terry Hartwick and former president Bill Clinton.

== See also ==
- Oneness Pentecostalism
