= PAJC =

PAJC may refer to:

- Chignik Airport, ICAO code PAJC
- Pentecostal Assemblies of Jesus Christ
