= Alamo Christian Foundation =

American religious cult

Founder
- Tony Alamo; Susan Alamo

Religions
- Self-created cult

Languages
- English

Website
- AlamoMinistries.com

The Alamo Christian Foundation was an American cult which was founded in 1969 by Tony Alamo and his wife, Susan Alamo.

The group was staunchly anti-Catholic. Susan Alamo died in April 1982. After years of legal troubles during which he engaged in abusive behavior against his followers, Tony Alamo was convicted of 10 child rape offenses in 2009. He received a maximum sentence of 175 years and was imprisoned until his death in May 2017.

== Founders ==
Tony Alamo (September 20, 1934 – May 2, 2017) was born Bernie Lazar Hoffman to a Jewish family in Joplin, Missouri. At the age of nine years old he was abandoned at the Father Flanagan Boys Town, where he claimed that he was abused on account of his Jewish ancestry. He grew up there and he went to local schools, but later, he migrated to the West Coast, where he adopted Christianity as his faith.

By the 1960s, he had settled in Hollywood, where he performed as a pop singer under the names Mark Hoffman and Marcus Abad. He was a petty criminal who was convicted of statutory rape, burglary, and theft before he was 21 years old. He also claimed to be a music promoter and owned the Little Mark, Alamo, and Talamo Records record labels.

Susan Alamo (April 25, 1925 – April 8, 1982) was born Edith Opal Horn in Alma, Arkansas. Twice married and with a daughter, she moved to Hollywood and attempted to become an actress. She had Jewish roots, but she was reared as a Christian Nazarene, never needing to convert from Judaism to Christianity; she became an itinerant evangelist, modeling her ministry after the ministry of her idol Aimee Semple McPherson before she met Hoffman.

After the couple divorced their respective spouses, Hoffman and Horn got married during a ceremony performed in Las Vegas in 1966. They legally changed their names to Tony Alamo and Susan Alamo.

== History ==
=== Early years ===
Tony and Susan Alamo founded the Alamo Christian Foundation in 1969 in Hollywood, California. The church became the subject of controversy, especially as its members were active in trying to recruit new members in Hollywood.

It was frequently criticized for its manner of evangelization, which frequently involved requiring young members of the congregation to walk around Hollywood, inviting people to convert to Christianity. They would take them to the church in Agua Dulce – roughly an hour away – for evening services, consisting of a meeting and a meal. Many of these individuals chose to stay on to become Bible students and lay ministers.

In 1976, the church relocated to Dyer, Arkansas, where Susan Alamo had been raised. There, in the small town which is located in the western part of the state, the church grew to several hundred members. It established printing facilities, a school, and a tabernacle. It also claimed to operate a drug rehabilitation facility, but in fact it was a facility for the purpose of Christian conversion.

Members of the church developed several businesses in the Alma, Arkansas area. As the church expanded, it established other churches in Nashville, Chicago, Brooklyn, and Miami Beach.

Alamo started a business, which heavily relied on unpaid child labor, of decorating denim jackets and airbrushing them with bright, colorful designs. Many Hollywood celebrities were seen wearing them, including Michael Jackson. He wore a modified leather Alamo jacket on the cover of his album Bad.

The church's projects included Nashville's largest country and western clothing store.

The church published religious tracts, and it also distributed tapes of sermons by the Alamos. With the help of some church members, they also produced records and tapes, and they launched a national television ministry in the 1970s. The ministry mostly aired on low-rated, non-network, high-power television stations in major markets. Susan led the preaching aspect of the ministry, with Tony mostly staying in the background in a production role, making only occasional appearances, usually to perform an inspirational song on camera. As the decade progressed, the criticism of their ministry grew. In response, the ministry produced "Susan Alamo Speaks Out", an interview-based program made up of claimed converts who had been transformed by the Alamos' ministry.

=== Death of Susan Alamo ===
Susan Alamo died of breast cancer on April 8, 1982, after first being diagnosed with the disease in 1975. She died 17 days short of her 57th birthday, at the Oral Roberts City of Faith Hospital in Tulsa, Oklahoma. In the reported belief that she would rise from the dead, her embalmed body was kept on display for six months. It was then entombed in a heart-shaped marble mausoleum on church property.

In 1991, the federal government confiscated the property. Its agents learned that Susan's remains had been removed. Her estranged daughter, Christhiaon Coie, filed a lawsuit against Tony Alamo because he had stolen the body. Her stepfather (by an earlier marriage of her mother) obtained a court order which required Tony Alamo to return the body.

=== Tax problems and criminal proceedings ===
In 1982, the same year that Susan Alamo died, Alamo discontinued the foundation in their name.

He replaced it with the newly incorporated Music Square Church (MSC). MSC had been granted 501c tax-exempt status in 1981. After the federal government had started investigation of the entity, the IRS retroactively revoked that tax-exempt status on April 5, 1996.

The IRS Commissioner found that "MSC was so closely operated and controlled by and for the benefit of Tony Alamo that it enjoyed no substantive independent existence; that MSC was formed and operated by Tony Alamo for the principal purpose of willfully attempting to defeat or evade federal income tax; and that MSC was inseparable from Tony Alamo, and failed to operate for exclusively charitable purposes." MSC sued and lost in the United States Court of Federal Claims. It lost on appeal to the United States Court of Appeals in 1999.

Alamo was arrested several times throughout his life, beginning with a charge for illegally possessing a weapon in 1966, for which he served prison time before he married Susan Alamo. He encountered increasing problems after Susan's death. Women said that he had sexually abused both them and minor children. In 2009, Alamo was convicted of 10 counts of transporting minors as young as 9 across state lines for sex. Alamo received the maximum sentence for his crimes, 175 years in prison.

In June 2013, the federal government filed forfeiture and collection actions in federal court on 27 properties which were owned by members of Tony Alamo Christian Ministries, in an attempt to collect $2.5 million in restitution that Alamo was ordered to pay to his victims. The U.S. Attorney's Office argued that the owners were "owners in name only" because the properties were still under Alamo's control.

=== Death of Tony Alamo ===
Alamo died on May 2, 2017, while he was in custody at the Federal Medical Center, Butner in Butner, North Carolina. He was 82 years old. Tony Alamo Ministries posted a notice of his death on its website's homepage, but it did not post a notice of succession nor did it state its future plans. The site, along with this notice, was still live, but it was inactive, as of 2026. The operators of the website had added two posts about Israel and a post with a file entitled There is no Palestine or "19200.pdf".

== Beliefs and practices ==
The group was Pentecostal in nature. It was frequently referred to as a sect of the Jesus movement. It was also extremely anti-Catholic, with Tony Alamo blaming Catholicism for communism, Nazism, World War I, World War II, the Jonestown massacre, drugs, prostitution, and pornography. Additionally, it only accepted the King James Version of the Bible. Susan Alamo frequently attacked organized religion on her programs.

Its members adhered to a moral code which required proper dress and standards of behavior, and condemned and forbade the use of drugs, homosexuality, adultery, birth control, and abortion. Individuals who sought to join the church agreed to turn all of their money and property over to the church. In return, their own needs would be met and their children would receive a basic education through high school.

== In popular culture ==
In 2016, playwright Ernest Kearney produced his one-man show My Alamo War for the Hollywood Fringe Festival in Los Angeles, California. The show recounted his four-year struggle against the Alamo church in Hollywood. He succeeded in getting the high-end jackets which were designed by Alamo and manufactured by unpaid cult members removed from a majority of the clothing stores which were located on Hollywood Boulevard. He and his supporters also gained the attention of the local media by informing it about the abuses of the cult. The show won the Fringe's Encore Producer Award.

In 2019, Sundance TV broadcast a four-part miniseries, Ministry of Evil: The Twisted Cult of Tony Alamo, based on the lives of Tony and Susan Alamo. It described their founding and running of the Tony and Susan Alamo Christian Foundation – it also called the foundation a "cult". It also described how the couple became rich by exploiting their followers who truly believed in them. Following his conviction, the program charged Tony Alamo with being a child abuser, a polygamist and a pedophile.

The documentary series includes archival footage, including Alamo's videotaped deposition, and interviews with former members of the cult and the FBI agent who brought Alamo down. The series of four 40-minute episodes was also broadcast on BBC Four and in April 2024, it was broadcast on the iPlayer.

In 2025, Freeform produced a series titled How I Escaped my Cult: Ten Stories of Survival, in which former members talk about their time in the Alamo Christian Foundation.

== See also ==
- Anti-Catholicism#United States
  - Anti-Catholicism in the United States
- Catholic–Protestant relations
- Christian fundamentalism
- Christianity and homosexuality
- Christianity and Judaism
- Christianity and other religions
- Christianity and violence
- Christian–Jewish reconciliation
- Christian Zionism
- History of Christian thought on persecution and tolerance
- Homosexuality and religion
- List of Christian denominations
- List of new religious movements
- List of organizations designated by the Southern Poverty Law Center as anti-LGBT hate groups#Alamo Christian Foundation
- List of Pentecostal and Full Gospel Churches
- List of Pentecostal churches
- List of Pentecostal denominations
- New religious movement
- Polygamy in Christianity
- Polygamy in North America
- Religious abuse
- Religious violence
- Chaim Rumkowski
