= Apostolic School of Theology =

Online biblical school

Coordinates: 38.4515°N 121.3349°W

Apostolic School of Theology (AST) was a private online Apostolic Bible college based in Elk Grove, California. In It provided undergraduate and graduate programs to members of the Apostolic Pentecostal denomination. It is now closed.
