= Frank Ewart =

Australian clergy (1876–1947)

Francis John Ewart (Australia 1876 – August 13, 1947) was a Pentecostal preacher, author and one of the founders of Oneness Pentecostalism and the UPCI.

== Biography ==
Ewart was born in Australia in 1876 and worked as a Baptist bush missionary until he immigrated to Weyburn, Saskatchewan, Canada, in 1903, where he pastored a Baptist church and married Violet May. With declining health, Ewart was furloughed in 1908, during which he attended a Pentecostal camp meeting in Portland, Oregon, where he converted to Pentecostalism, resulting in his dismissal from the Baptist church he was pastoring. In 1911, Ewart moved to Los Angeles and became assistant pastor and later pastor of William Durham’s Seventh Street Mission after Durham's death. In 1913, Ewart attended the World Wide Apostolic Faith Camp Meeting, where Ewart heard R.E. McAlister give the initial sermon on Jesus' Name doctrine. During and after the meeting, Ewart, McAlister, and later Glenn Cook met and refined the new Jesus' Name doctrine. By 1914, Ewart and Cook started preaching Jesus' Name doctrine and re-baptized each other in the name of Jesus. As well as preaching, Ewart created Meat in Due Season, a periodical that advocated for the Jesus' Name doctrine and had a global reach persuading many Pentecostals including G.T Haywood, Frank Small, Elmer K. Fisher, E.N. Bell, and L.C. Hall. Nearing the end of his life, Ewart wrote The Phenomenon of Pentecost, a narrative history of the Pentecostal movement that is still recommended reading by the UPCI. On August 13, 1947, Ewart died of cancer.
