= Apostolic Assemblies of Christ =

The Apostolic Assemblies of Christ, Inc.
- Classification: Protestant
- Orientation: Oneness Pentecostal
- Polity: Episcopal
- Region: United States of America
- Headquarters: Detroit, MI, USA
- Founder: George Marshall Boone
- Origin: 1970, Detroit; Detroit, MI
- Branched from: Pentecostal Churches of the Apostolic Faith
- Congregations: est. 259
- Members: est. 50,000
- Official website: http://www.apostolicassembliesofchrist.com

The Apostolic Assemblies of Christ (AAofC), is a Christian denomination in the Oneness Pentecostal tradition. Founded on March 20, 1970, by Presiding Bishop G.M. Boone, the organization's headquarters is located in Detroit, Michigan.
