= Irvin Baxter Jr. =

American pastor (1945–2020)

- Born: Irvin Lee Baxter Jr. July 8, 1945; Richmond, Indiana, U.S.
- Died: November 3, 2020 (aged 75); Plano, Texas, U.S.
- Occupations: Televangelist; author; speaker; biblical scholar
- Years active: 1964–2020
- Children: 3
- Website: endtime.com

Irvin Lee Baxter Jr. (July 8, 1945 – November 3, 2020) was an American Oneness Pentecostal minister, televangelist, author, and biblical scholar. He hosted the internationally syndicated biblical prophecy television program, End of The Age, and was also the founder and president of Endtime Ministries, a Christian organization devoted to presenting his views on Christian eschatology. Before he founded Endtime Ministries, Baxter served as pastor of the Oak Park Church (UPCI).

He died of complications from COVID-19 in Plano, Texas, during the COVID-19 pandemic in Texas.

== Life and ministerial career ==
According to his website, Baxter became intensely interested in Bible prophecy at the age of 19, when a visiting evangelist taught that the four beasts of chapter four in the book of Revelation represented the four gospels, Matthew, Mark, Luke, and John. He believed this was incorrect, and in the next thirty days read the book of Revelation nineteen times. His studies led him to devote considerable time to study Pentecostal and evangelical eschatology.

In 1986, Baxter authored A Message for the President, in which he identified Russia, the United Kingdom, United States and other modern countries as being referenced in the Bible. He also said that the Berlin Wall would be torn down, (Germany) would be reunited and that these events would be the catalyst which would inaugurate a permanent New World Order. In 1991, his organization began to publish Endtime Magazine. Baxter published the book Mideast Treaty in 1994 about his predictions for the prophesied final seven years preceding the Battle of Armageddon. In 1995, Baxter published a series of lessons aimed at lay readers titled Understanding the Endtime.

Baxter has published two works of fiction: China War and the Third Temple (2001) depicts Baxter's view of the near future, and Dark Intentions (2004) which is a story of how the Antichrist, as a young boy, foresaw world events in detail and used the knowledge to his advantage.

== Endtime Ministries ==
Endtime Ministries was founded in 1991. Baxter bought the Oak Park Church from the Church of God congregation in 2002, 11 years after the founding of Endtime Ministries. Prior to 2002, he pastored a United Pentecostal Church in the 1200 block of South 8th street in Richmond, Indiana where he first set up Endtime Ministries out of the Church.

Later, he purchased a building on the north side of the UPC building where Endtime operated until they outgrew that location. He then purchased a building southeast of the UPC, a commercial building, originally occupied by a bank. Upon the purchase of the Oak Park Church building in 2002, the UPC congregation moved to Oak Park and shared the building with the Church of God congregation until the previous owners could find a new home to worship. Irvin separated Endtime from the Oak Park congregation and moved to Dallas where he set up as full time radio and television evangelist.

Baxter also hosted the National Prophecy radio talk show called Politics and Religion, which began in 1998. He also conducted one-day prophecy conferences in the U.S. His teachings on the Armageddon were recorded in the DVD America’s God-Given Destiny.

== Personal life ==
Baxter and his wife, Judy, have three adult children and eight grandchildren and resided in Richardson, Texas.

Baxter died from COVID-19 on November 3, 2020, in Plano, Texas. He was 75 years old.

== See also ==
- Dispensationalism
- Futurism
- Summary of Christian eschatological differences
