= Apostolic World Christian Fellowship =

Apostolic World Christian Fellowship (AWCF) is an alliance of Oneness Pentecostal organizations that include 181 organizations, 20,200 ministers, and 5.2 million members worldwide. It was founded in 1971 by Worthy G. Rowe, a pastor in South Bend, Indiana, out of a desire for unity among the smaller Oneness Pentecostal organizations. Excluded from other pan-Pentecostal organizations such as the Pentecostal and Charismatic Churches of North America and the Pentecostal World Fellowship, Oneness organizations utilize the AWCF to assess numerical growth and initiate joint-evangelistic efforts. In May 1991. W.G. Rowe was succeeded by Bishop Samuel L. Smith as the General Chairman of the AWCF until 2021. The current General Chairman and Presiding Bishop of the AWCF is Bishop Luke Smith, Senior Pastor of Gracepoint Church in Evansville, Indiana. Bishop Smith is also the son-in-law of Jesus Miracle Crusade Founders Evangelist-Pastor Wilde E. Almeda, and his wife, Assistant Pastor Lina C. Almeda. The Jesus Miracle Crusade International Ministry (JMCIM) is a Oneness Pentecostal denomination in the Philippines with over 2 million members.
