= R.E. McAlister =

- Born: 1880; Township of Ross, Renfrew County, Ontario, Canada
- Died: September 25, 1953 (aged 72–73)
- Occupation: Reverend
- Spouse: Laura McAlister
- Parent(s): James and Margaret McAlister
- Religion: Christian (Pentecostalism)
- Offices held: Secretary-Treasurer of Pentecostal Assemblies of Canada

Rev. Robert Edward McAlister (1880 – 25 September 1953) was a Canadian pastor and evangelist who was one of the founding members of The Pentecostal Assemblies of Canada.

== Early life and conversion ==
R.E. McAlister was born in 1880 in Township of Ross, in Renfrew County, Ontario. His parents, James and Margaret McAlister, were Presbyterians at the time of his birth. In 1891, the McAlister family moved to Cobden, Ontario where McAlister became a Christian in the Holiness Movement church were his father was an elder. After his conversion, McAlister left Cobden to attend Bible College in Cincinnati, Ohio, but left in his second year when he became ill. Later, in Autumn of 1906, McAlister was traveling as an evangelist and decided to travel to Los Angeles, California after hearing about the Azusa Street Revival. At Azusa Street, it is believed McAlister became the first Canadian to receive the Holy Spirit. After the revival, McAlister returned to Ottawa to hold Pentecostal meetings in areas he was connected to with the Holiness Movement Church.

== "The New Issue" ==
In 1913, R.J. Scott organized the World-Wide Apostolic Faith Camp Meeting as an effort to unite other Pentecostals. During the event, tents were set up and several speakers were scheduled to give guest sermons to the event attendees. Scott asked McAlister to attend the event and give a sermon on baptism. McAlister felt that it was the perfect opportunity to preach about his new understanding of the baptismal formula that was presented in Matthew 28:19. During his sermon, McAlister claimed that pastors should stop baptizing in the name of the Father, Son, and Holy Spirit, and only baptize in Jesus’ name because that was what the early church did. Other pastors at the event criticized McAlister for his remarks, yet he continued baptizing others only in the name of Jesus. One of the congregants at the camp meeting, John G. Scheppe, ran through the camp meeting shouting his revelation of the formula of the name of Jesus used in baptism in agreement with McAlister.

In response of McAlister’s sermon, Frank Ewart wrote, “the shot has been fired, and its sound was destined to be heard around the world, as Christendom would soon be shaken by this new doctrine." In 1914, a year after McAlister gave his sermon over baptism, Frank Ewart and Glenn Cook baptized each other in the name of Jesus, starting the Oneness movement. McAlister's message also influenced many other pastors such as Howard A. Goss.

However, in 1919, Aimee Semple McPherson preached a series in Ontario rejecting the Oneness movement and asking smaller organizations to join the Assemblies of God. As a result, McAlister left the Oneness movement and joined a Trinitarian group.

McAlister was influential in the formation of the Pentecostal Assemblies of Canada, a governing body of churches that place a high emphasis on Spirit baptism and Trinitarian theology.

== The Pentecostal Assemblies of Canada ==
On May 17, 1917, after backlash from other Pentecostal members concerning the creation of a Pentecostal denomination, McAlister, along with other Pentecostal leaders met in Montreal to discuss the creation of a church. It wasn't until after a second meeting in autumn of 1917 they decided to call their new church The Pentecostal Assemblies of Canada. Later in 1919, McAlister was named the Secretary-Treasurer of the new church. Because McAlister was the key business leader of the church, the national offices were wherever McAlister was pastoring at the time until 1937. In 1937 McAlister was succeeded by A.G. Ward as the new Secretary-Treasurer and editor of The Pentecostal Testimony.
