= Assemblies of God Statement of Fundamental Truths =

Assemblies of God USA confession of faith

The Statement of Fundamental Truths is a confession of faith outlining the 16 essential doctrines adhered to by the Assemblies of God USA. These doctrines are heavily based on other evangelical confessions of faith but differ by being clearly Pentecostal. Of the 16 articles, four are considered core beliefs "due to the key role they play in reaching the lost and building the believer and the church". They are the doctrines concerning salvation, the baptism in the Holy Spirit, divine healing, and the Second Coming of Christ. The Statement of Fundamental Truths has undergone several permutations since its original adoption in 1916 (when it actually included 17 items) despite common claims that it has remained largely unchanged.

== Contents ==
Most of the statement reiterates basic tenets of evangelicalism while adding articles on "healing by the atonement" and tongues as "initial evidence" of baptism in the Holy Spirit. Article 12 concerns divine healing. The official church teaching is that Christ paid for all physical suffering with his atoning work and that as a consequence, when Christians get sick they can be supernaturally healed by the Holy Spirit. Article 9 reflects a non-Wesleyan perspective on sanctification. Articles 13-16 deal largely with the subject of eschatology. The Assemblies of God has a dispensationalist perspective on the future, including belief in the rapture and a literal earthly millennium. The following is a summary of the 16 Fundamental Truths:

1. The Bible is inspired by God and is "the infallible, authoritative rule of faith and conduct".
2. There is only one true God who exists as a Trinity.
3. Jesus Christ is the Son of God and, as the second person of the Trinity, is God.
4. Man was created good and upright. However, man by voluntary transgression fell and thereby incurred not only physical death but also spiritual death, which is separation from God.
5. Salvation "is received through repentance toward God and faith toward the Lord Jesus Christ".
6. There are two ordinances. Believer's baptism by immersion is a declaration to the world that the believer has died and been raised together with Christ, becoming a new creation. The Lord's Supper is a symbol expressing the believer's sharing in the divine nature of Christ, a memorial of Christ's suffering and death, and a prophecy of Christ's second coming.
7. Baptism in the Holy Spirit is a separate and subsequent experience following conversion. Spirit baptism brings empowerment to live an overcoming Christian life and to be an effective witness.
8. Speaking in tongues is the initial physical evidence of the baptism in the Holy Spirit.
9. Sanctification is "an act of separation from that which is evil, and of dedication unto God". It occurs when the believer identifies with, and has faith in, Christ in his death and resurrection. It is understood to be a process in that it requires continual yielding to the Holy Spirit.
10. The Church's mission is to seek and save all who are lost in sin; the Church is the Body of Christ and consists of all people who accept Christ, regardless of Christian denomination.
11. Divinely called and scripturally-ordained ministers serve the Church.
12. Divine healing of the sick is provided for in the atonement.
13. The "imminent and blessed hope" of the Church is its rapture preceding the bodily return of Christ to earth.
14. The rapture of the Church will be followed by the visible return of Christ and his reign on earth for a thousand years.
15. There will be a final judgment and eternal damnation for the "wicked dead".
16. There will be future new heavens and a new earth "wherein dwelleth righteousness".

== History ==
The Assemblies of God was founded in 1914 but it was not until 1916 that it reluctantly created the Fundamental Truths in response to several doctrinal controversies. The first controversy, referred to as the Finished work controversy, arose from disagreement over the second blessing and the practical meaning of holiness. The second or "Oneness" controversy questioned the baptismal formula, the doctrine of the Trinity, and the understanding of the process of salvation. The third one was over whether speaking in tongues was the "initial physical evidence" of Holy Spirit baptism or not.

The outcome of these controversies, reflected in the Statement of Fundamental Truths, not only shaped the denomination but also shaped American Pentecostalism. In 1916, the General Council (the denomination's governing body) took a strong stand against the Oneness teaching and upheld the position that speaking in tongues was the initial evidence of baptism in the Holy Spirit. The Assemblies of God remains Trinitarian and continues to affirm the doctrine of initial evidence.

=== Statement on sanctification ===
The position adopted in the Statement of Fundamental Truths regarding sanctification was less clear. The men behind the formation of the Assemblies of God were Pentecostals who had come to the conclusion that holiness or sanctification was not a second blessing or a definite experience but instead a lifelong process. This idea of progressive sanctification was believed by many within the Assemblies of God but there were adherents who still held to the theology of the holiness movement.

The original language on sanctification in the Fundamental Truths was a compromise between Wesleyan and non-Wesleyan members which allowed the two doctrines to coexist. Under the heading "Entire Sanctification, The Goal For All Believers", it read, "Entire sanctification is the will of God for all believers, and should be earnestly pursued by walking in obedience to God's Word". The term "entire sanctification" is distinctly Wesleyan, but the statement actually called "for an ongoing, process of obedience in reliance on, and cooperation with the Holy Ghost".

In 1961, the General Council revised the statement significantly, giving it its current form. It eliminated some of the Wesleyan language, such as "entire". Stanley M. Horton, who served on the revision committee, stated that the committee "... felt that the word entire was ambiguous because we were using it with a different meaning than that promoted by holiness Pentecostals who taught a second definite work". While the current statement does represent the Assemblies of God's position more accurately, the denomination's teaching on sanctification remains ambiguous.
