= Endtime Ministries =

American Pentecostal Christian organization

Endtime Ministries is an American Pentecostal Christian organization. It defines itself as a teacher of biblical prophecy founded and headed by minister Irvin Baxter Jr. The organization is based in Plano, Texas.

It focuses on explaining world events from its view of the Bible, with an emphasis on prophecy and exposition of eschatological theories. Some of these predictions include a new world war that will kill up to two billion people, and the identification of Britain, the reunified Holy Roman Empire, Russia and Germany with the "four beasts" of the Book of Daniel.

== Controversy ==
In 2006, Endtime Ministries hosted a rally in its home city of Garland, Texas to protest the REAL ID Act of 2005, which Baxter linked to the Mark of the Beast prophesied in Book of Revelation 13:15-18.

In 2020, Endtime ministries applied for and received $300,000 or more from the Small Business Administration’s Payroll Protection Program. At issue is repayment or loan forgiveness. Endtime relies on contributions through sales of its magazine, Internet presence, and radio broadcasts. As a non-profit organization, Endtime ministries pays no taxes to the federal government.

In 2020, Irvin Baxter Jr. suggested that the coronavirus pandemic was a warning from God about the “sin of fornication”. Baxter Jr. died on November 3 from complications with COVID-19, his Plano-based ministry announced.

== See also ==
- Summary of Christian eschatological differences
