= Pentecostal Assemblies of the World =

Oneness Pentecostal denomination

- Classification: Protestant
- Orientation: Pentecostal
- Theology: Oneness Pentecostal
- Leader: Theodore L. Brooks, Sr.
- Region: Worldwide
- Origin: 1917
- Merger of: Pentecostal Assemblies of the World (pre-1917), General Assembly of the Apostolic Assemblies
- Separations: Pentecostal Church, Incorporated, Pentecostal Churches of the Apostolic Faith; Apostolic Church of Jesus Christ, Emmanuel’s Church of Jesus Christ,
- Congregations: Approx. 4,000
- Members: 2 million
- Official website: PAW Website

The Pentecostal Assemblies of the World (P.A.W.) is a Oneness Pentecostal denomination headquartered in Indianapolis, Indiana. Claiming an estimated 2 million members in approximately 4,000 churches as of 2022, the Association of Religion Data Archives reported the PAW as having 54,934 members in 108 U.S. churches.

== History ==
=== Early years (1914–1917) ===
The Pentecostal Assemblies of the World is the result of the merger of two Oneness Pentecostal bodies in the early years of the Pentecostal movement. The oldest body was founded in 1914 by a Oneness minister named J. J. Frazier. The church was centered on the West Coast and was the first to use the Pentecostal Assemblies of the World name.

The second body resulted from a schism within the Assemblies of God USA in 1916. That year the Assemblies of God general council disapproved of Oneness Pentecostal doctrine and adopted a trinitarian Statement of Fundamental Truths. This forced a large minority of Pentecostal ministers and churches to withdraw from the Assemblies of God and form a new group advocating Oneness Pentecostalism. They were led by Garfield Thomas Haywood, formerly the leading African-American pastor within the Assemblies of God. This group met in Eureka Springs, Arkansas, to create an organization capable of issuing ministerial credentials named the General Assembly of the Apostolic Churches. The top officials of this new organization were D. C. O. Opperman and Howard A. Goss, formerly important leaders of the Assemblies of God.

Early Pentecostals were pacifists. As the likelihood of America's entering World War I increased, the General Assembly of the Apostolic Churches attempted to gain government recognition in order to protect its young ministers from the draft law. Being unsuccessful in this endeavor, it was decided to merge with a similar organization already possessing incorporated status. Frazier's group was already incorporated, and the two groups merged in late 1917 under the PAW name. The first chairman of the merged group was C. W. Doak, a white man, and the first secretary was G. T. Haywood.

=== 1924 division ===
For nine years after the merger, the PAW was able to maintain its status as an interracial fellowship of churches. Certain factors, however, would eventually lead to a breakdown in the communion between whites and blacks. One contributing factor to division was the reality of racial segregation and Jim Crow laws in the southern United States. Because no racially integrated meetings could be held in the South, all of the PAW's conventions had to be held in northern cities. Due to the distance, there were always fewer southern representatives in the church's governing bodies. Since the majority of northern members were black and the majority of southern members were white this created a situation where whites were always outvoted.

In 1924, white leaders of the organization separated from the PAW to form the Pentecostal Church, Incorporated. This group subsequently merged with the Pentecostal Assemblies of Jesus Christ to become the present-day United Pentecostal Church International.

=== Episcopal era and presiding bishops ===
The PAW identifies a series of presiding bishops (sometimes termed the "bishopric timeline"), including:

- Bishop Theodore L. Brooks Sr. (2018–present)

== See also ==
- Christianity in the United States
- Church of Our Lord Jesus Christ
