= Garfield Thomas Haywood =

American bishop (1880–1931)

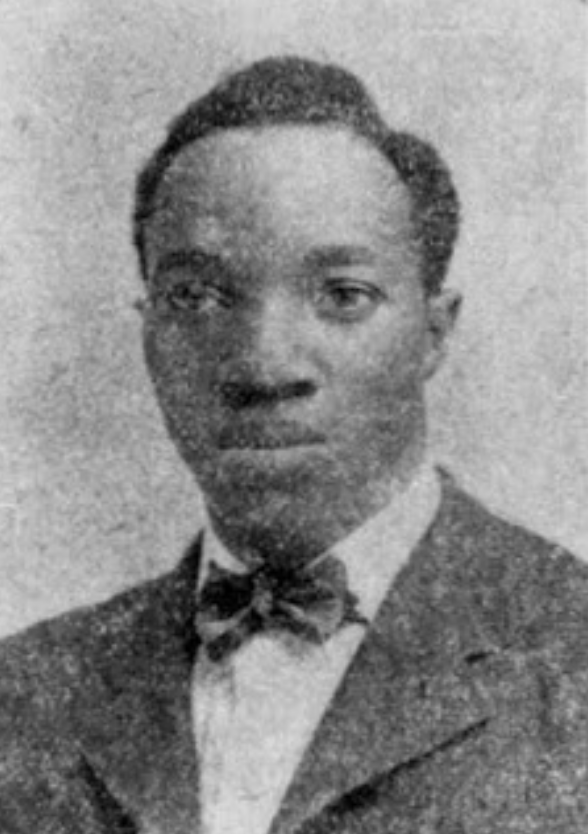
- Haywood at age 22 in 1903
- Born: July 15, 1880; Greencastle, Indiana, US
- Died: April 12, 1931
- Church: Christ Temple
- Offices held: 1917 Field Superintendent, PAW 1925 Presiding Bishop of the PAW
- Title: Bishop

Garfield Thomas Haywood (July 15, 1880 – April 12, 1931) was an American Oneness Pentecostal (Apostolic) pastor and songwriter who served as Presiding Bishop of the Pentecostal Assemblies of the World from 1925 to 1931.

== Early life ==
Haywood, who was African-American, was born to Bennett and Pennyann Haywood in Greencastle, Indiana, in 1880 and moved to Haughville, a neighborhood in Indianapolis, at the age of three. As a child, he attended School 52 and then Shortridge High School. Haywood was employed by the Indianapolis Freeman and Indianapolis Recorder newspapers as a cartoonist.

== Ministry ==
In 1909, Haywood founded Christ Temple church. Haywood's influence crossed ethnic boundaries, and by 1913, Christ Temple had a biracial congregation of 400 to 500 which later grew to 1500.

Around 1915, Haywood received a copy of Frank Ewart's paper Meat in Due Season which argued for Jesus' name doctrine, which rejects the Trinity. In response, Haywood invited the evangelist Glenn A. Cook to preach at Christ Temple, resultIng in Haywood being re-baptized in the name of Jesus; he in turn re-baptized 465 members of his congregation. This facilitated the spread of Oneness Pentecostalism throughout Indiana.

The third general council of the Assemblies of God convened in October 1915 and primary on the agenda was a debate on the merits of the new Jesus' name doctrine vs the traditional Trinitarian doctrine. Haywood and E. N. Bell spoke on behalf of the Jesus' name doctrine and Collins and Jacob Miller spoke against. The result was a draw and it was agreed to readdress the topic at the fourth general council in October 1916. At the fourth general council, a statement of faith was enacted that soundly rejected Jesus' name doctrine, causing just over a fourth of the ministers to leave the Assemblies of God.

By 1911, Haywood had become affiliated with the Pentecostal Assemblies of the World (PAW) and after his conversion helped convert the organization to Oneness Pentecostalism. Many of the former Assemblies of God ministers that left in 1916 formed the General Assembly of the Apostolic Assemblies which at the start of World War I merged with the PAW in order for its ministers to obtain non-combatant status. The new interracial organization appointed Haywood as its general chairman. In 1924, White PAW leaders left the denomination due to their anti-Black sentiments fueled by the Jim Crow era, and Haywood was appointed Bishop of the newly reorganized, African American-led PAW.

Haywood composed many gospel songs including "Jesus, the Son of God", "I See a Crimson Stream of Blood", and "Do All in Jesus’ Name". Many of his songs were published in The Bridegroom Songs, which was published by Christ Temple. Haywood was also an author and Oneness apologist. He wrote tracts, such as "The Victim of the Flaming Sword" and "The Finest of Wheat" as well as published The Voice in the Wilderness, a publication that became the official organ of the Pentecostal Assemblies of the World in 1925.

Upon his death in 1931, Haywood was interred in Crown Hill Cemetery. In 1980, the city of Indianapolis designated the segment of Fall Creek Drive where Christ Temple is located as "Bishop Garfield T. Haywood Memorial Way" in his honor.
