= David K. Bernard =

American Oneness Pentecostal theologian (born 1956)

- Born: November 20, 1956 (age 69); Baton Rouge, Louisiana, U.S.
- Education: Rice University; University of Texas; University of South Africa
- Spouse: Connie Bernard
- Children: 3
- Parent(s): Elton D. Bernard; Loretta Bernard
- Church: United Pentecostal Church International
- Congregations served: New Life Church of Austin, Texas
- Offices held: General Superintendent

David Kane Bernard (born November 20, 1956, in Baton Rouge, Louisiana) is an American New Testament scholar and Oneness Pentecostal theologian. He is the General Superintendent of the United Pentecostal Church International, the largest Oneness Pentecostal organization with constituents worldwide. He teaches as a Professor of Biblical Studies and Apostolic Leadership at Urshan Graduate School of Theology, where he is also Chancellor.

== Career ==
David Bernard was the founder of New Life Church of Austin, Texas, out of which 16 additional churches were started under his leadership. He was also the founding president of Urshan University and Urshan Graduate School of Theology and currently teaches as a professor of Biblical Studies and Apostolic Leadership at Urshan Graduate School of Theology. He received his Master of Theology and Doctor of Theology in New Testament from the University of South Africa, his Juris Doctor with honors from the University of Texas, and a Bachelor of Arts magna cum laude in mathematical sciences and managerial studies from Rice University.

He has authored 37 books with a reported circulation of 900,000 in 39 languages. His works are commonly referred to in understanding the beliefs of Oneness Pentecostals. His book, The New Birth (1984), is said to have been used more extensively than any other to demonstrate the beliefs of Oneness Pentecostals since publication. Other works regarded as notable include The Oneness of God (1983) and The Oneness of Jesus Christ (1994).

Bernard has also engaged in scholarly dialogue with trinitarians which has been welcomed by some in the wider pentecostal community. A "Trinity-Oneness Dialogue" also emerged at Society for Pentecostal Studies during this time. Bernard chaired the Oneness team. More recently, Amos Young, a professor at Fuller Theological Seminary, wrote that his work "marks the emerging maturation of the Oneness Pentecostal academy."

== Works ==
=== Thesis ===
- Bernard, David K. (2017). The Glory of God in the Face of Jesus Christ: Deification of Jesus in Early Christian Discourse (ThD). Journal of Pentecostal Theology - supplement series. Vol. 45. Blandford Forum, UK: Deo Publishing (University of South Africa). ISBN 9781905679362. OCLC 976014259.

=== Books ===
- ———; Bernard, Loretta A. (1981). In Search of Holiness. Pentecostal Theology series. Vol. 3. Hazelwood, MO: Word Aflame Press. ISBN 9780912315409. OCLC 17806613.
- ——— (1983). The Oneness of God. Pentecostal Theology series. Vol. 1. Hazelwood, MO: Word Aflame Press. ISBN 9780912315126. OCLC 11103338.
- ——— (1984). The New Birth. Pentecostal Theology series. Vol. 2. Hazelwood, MO: Word Aflame Press. ISBN 9780912315775. OCLC 11813863.
- ——— (1985). Practical Holiness: a second look. Pentecostal Theology series. Vol. 4. Hazelwood, MO: Word Aflame Press. ISBN 9780912315911. OCLC 13524663.
- ——— (1985). Essentials of Oneness Theology. Hazelwood, MO: Word Aflame Press. ISBN 9780912315898. OCLC 13861950.
- ———; Stegall, Neil (1987). A Study Guide for The New Birth. Hazelwood, MO: Word Aflame Press. ISBN 9780932581150. OCLC 15549931.
- ——— (1987). Essentials of the New Birth. Hazelwood, MO: Word Aflame Press. ISBN 9780932581211. OCLC 22855449.
- ——— (1987). The Message of Romans. Hazelwood, MO: Word Aflame Press. ISBN 9780932581181. OCLC 15860086.
- ——— (1988). A Handbook of Basic Doctrines: a compilation of scripture references. Hazelwood, MO: Word Aflame Press. ISBN 9780932581372. OCLC 18163218.
- ——— (1988). Essential Doctrines of the Bible. Hazelwood, MO: Word Aflame Press. ISBN 9780932581280. OCLC 22855467.
- ——— (1989). Essentials of Holiness. Hazelwood, MO: Word Aflame Press. ISBN 9780932581556. OCLC 20129794.
- ———; Stegall, Neil (1990). A Study Guide for The Oneness of God. Hazelwood, MO: Word Aflame Press. ISBN 9780932581594. OCLC 35299837.
- ——— (1990). The Message of Colossians and Philemon. Hazelwood, MO: Word Aflame Press. ISBN 9780932581709. OCLC 21524059.
- ——— (1991). Oneness and Trinity, AD 100-300. Hazelwood, MO: Word Aflame Press. ISBN 9780932581815. OCLC 23016596.
- ——— (1992). In the Name of Jesus. Hazelwood, MO: Word Aflame Press. ISBN 9780932581952. OCLC 24670912.
- ——— (1992). God's Infallible Word. Hazelwood, MO: Word Aflame Press. ISBN 9781905679362. OCLC 948846383.
- ——— (1993). The Trinitarian Controversy in the Fourth Century. Hazelwood, MO: Word Aflame Press. ISBN 9781567220094. OCLC 27430666.
- ——— (1994). The Oneness View of Jesus Christ. Hazelwood, MO: Word Aflame Press. ISBN 9781567220209. OCLC 29845295.
- ——— (1995). A History of Christian Doctrine, Vol. 1: The Post-Apostolic Age to the Middle Ages A.D. 100 - 1500. Hazelwood, MO: Word Aflame Press. ISBN 9781567220360.
- ——— (1995). A History of Christian Doctrine, Vol. 2: The Reformation to the Holiness Movement A.D. 1500-1900. Hazelwood, MO: Word Aflame Press. ISBN 9781567221879.
- ——— (1997). Spiritual Gifts: practical teaching and inspirational accounts of God's supernatural gifts to His church. Blandford Forum, UK: Deo Publishing. ISBN 9781567222043. OCLC 37451843.
- ——— (1998). Understanding the Articles of Faith: an examination of United Pentecostal beliefs. Hazelwood, MO: Word Aflame Press. ISBN 9781567222128. OCLC 42438657.
- ——— (1999). A History of Christian Doctrine, Vol. 3: The Twentieth Century A.D. 1900-2000. Hazelwood, MO: Word Aflame Press. ISBN 9781567222210.
- ——— (2001). Growing a Church: seven Apostolic principles. Hazelwood, MO: Word Aflame Press. ISBN 9781567225587. OCLC 48501137.
- ——— (2005). Understanding God's Word: an apostolic approach to interpreting the Bible. Hazelwood, MO: Word Aflame Press. ISBN 9781567226621. OCLC 61131756.
- ——— (2006). The Apostolic Life. Hazelwood, MO: Word Aflame Press. ISBN 9781567226959. OCLC 70230611.
- ——— (2007). Justification and the Holy Spirit. Hazelwood, MO: Word Aflame Press. ISBN 9781567227048.
- ———; Bernard, Loretta A. (2011). A Study Guide for In Search of Holiness. Hazelwood, MO: Word Aflame Press. ISBN 9781567229493. OCLC 754389824.
- ———; Johnston, Robin M. (2011). On Being Pentecostal. Hazelwood, MO: Word Aflame Press. ISBN 9781567229516. OCLC 747385715.
- ——— (2012). A Study Guide for Practical Holiness: a second look. Hazelwood, MO: Word Aflame Press. ISBN 9781567229554. OCLC 801219601.
- ——— (2013). Pursuing Holiness: a small group resource developed from in search of holiness and practical holiness. Hazelwood, MO: Word Aflame Press. ISBN 9781567229769. OCLC 827849038.
- ——— (2015). Spiritual Leadership in the Twenty-First Century. Hazelwood, MO: Word Aflame Press. ISBN 9780757747168. OCLC 911135214.
- ——— (2016). The Glory of God in the Face of Jesus Christ: deification of Jesus in early Christian discourse. Journal of Pentecostal theology - Supplement series. Vol. 45. Blandford Forum, UK: Deo Publishing. ISBN 9781905679362. OCLC 948846383.
- ———. Bible Doctrines and Study Guide. ISBN 9780757736988.
- ——— (2019). Apostolic Identity in a Postmodern World. Hazelwood, MO: Word Aflame Press. ISBN 9780757760730.
- ——— (2021). To The End Of The Earth: Adventures In Missions. Hazelwood, MO: Word Aflame Press. ISBN 9780757761515.
- ——— (2022). Reaching Austin: Establishing an Apostolic Church in a Postmodern City. Hazelwood, MO: Word Aflame Press. ISBN 9780757759703.

=== Edited by ===
- ———; Hall, J. L., eds. (1991). The Pentecostal Minister. Hazelwood, MO: Word Aflame Press. ISBN 9780932581846. OCLC 23254900.
- ———; Hall, J. L., eds. (1993). Doctrines of the Bible. Hazelwood, MO: Word Aflame Press. ISBN 9780932581716. OCLC 21522676.
