= Manna Full Gospel Churches =

Christian Pentecostal denomination in India

- Theology: Pentecostal
- Governance: Presbyterian polity
- Associations: International Fellowship of Christian Assemblies
- Region: India
- Founder: Ernest Paul Komanapalli
- Origin: 1966
- Congregations: 1,600
- Members: 150,000
- Official website: http://www.manna7.org/index.asp

Manna Full Gospel Churches is a Christian Pentecostal denomination in India. It was founded in 1966 and is headquartered in the city of Amalapuram. It belongs to Manna Group of Ministries and is affiliated with the International Fellowship of Christian Assemblies.

The leader of the Manna Full Gospel Churches was Presiding Bishop Ernest Komanapalli until his death in 2021, succeeded by his wife, Bishop Rachel Komanapalli along with BishopSudharshan Jyothi Komanapalli, Bishop Carl Komanapalli, Bishop Spurgen Pachigalla, Rev DevanaKumar, Rev Ernest Thathapudi.

Its membership exceeds 150,000 in over 1,600 congregations. Despite being predominantly in India, Manna Ministries, as Manna Ministries International, has church plants in other countries. They have churches and affiliates in the United States, South Africa, the Middle East and elsewhere.
