= Baptism in the name of Jesus =

Christian doctrine stating that baptism should be in Jesus' name only

The Jesus' name doctrine or the Oneness doctrine upholds that baptism is to be performed "in the name of Jesus Christ," rather than using the Trinitarian formula "in the name of the Father, and of the Son, and of the Holy Spirit." It is most commonly associated with Oneness Christology and the movement of Oneness Pentecostalism; however, some Trinitarians also baptise in Jesus' name and interpret it as on the authority of Jesus' name which most of mainstream Christendom justifies as referencing the existence of a Trinitarian Christian deity through the Great Commission among other precepts such as instances in the Old Testament.

Those who ascribe to the Oneness doctrine believe that "Jesus" is the name of God revealed in the New Testament and that Father, Son, and Holy Spirit are three manifestations or titles of the one God.

== History ==
=== Early Christianity ===
The first baptisms in early Christianity are recorded in the Acts of the Apostles. Acts 2 records the Apostle Peter, on the day of Pentecost, specifically preaching to the crowds of Jews to "repent and be baptised in the name of Jesus Christ for the remission (or forgiveness) of sins" (Acts 2:38). Other detailed records of baptisms in Acts show the first apostles baptizing in the name of Jesus. The Apostle Paul also refers to baptism into Christ Jesus.

According to Oneness theologian David K. Bernard, the Trinitarian formula from Matthew 28:19 became popularized over time. The Didache, a church manual dating to the first century on the other hand, instructs baptism to be done "in the name of the Father and of the Son and of the Holy Spirit," according to the Great Commission, though eucharistic instruction states "but let none eat or drink of your Eucharist except those who have been baptised in the Lord's Name." This, according to Oneness Pentecostals, could be a reference to early century "Jesus name" baptism against the Trinitarian formula often interpreted as according to the authority of Jesus by mainstream Christians.

Mainstream scholars such as Craig S. Keener, F. F. Bruce, Richard I. Pervo, Stephen G. Wilson, and Barclay M. Newman and Eugene A. Nida contend that this command to "be baptised in the name of Jesus Christ" identified an immediate Jewish audience—thereby offering the means of conversion from Judaism to early Christianity, and not as a universal baptismal formula believed by Oneness Pentecostals.

=== Contemporary Christianity ===
Charles Parham, one of the central figures in the development and early spread of American Pentecostalism, is recorded to have baptised new believers in Jesus name during the Azusa Street Revival, however, he also repudiated the Oneness doctrine. The controversy occurred when R.E. McAlister, who received a "new revelation," preached just prior to a baptismal service to be conducted at the World-Wide Apostolic Faith Camp Meeting held in Arroyo Seco, California. He preached that pastors should stop baptising in the name of the Father, Son, and Holy Spirit, and only baptize in Jesus’ name because that was what the early Church did; this became known as "The New Issue". A young minister also received this private revelation. In 1914, a year after McAlister gave his sermon over baptism, Frank Ewart and Glenn Cook rebaptised each other in the name of Jesus. This led a number of adherents to a reexamination of the doctrine of the Trinity, birthing the Oneness Pentecostal movement.

== Theology ==
Most adherents of the Jesus' name doctrine assert that baptism in the name of Jesus is the proper method, and most (but not all) feel that baptism "in the name of the Father, and of the Son, and of the Holy Ghost" is invalid because they teach that Father, Son, and Holy Ghost are not names but titles. Alternatively, the name of the Son is Jesus, so it is argued the actual name Jesus should be used; Jesus is the name of the Son, and arguably by them also the name of the Father and Holy Ghost.

There are a number of nontrinitarian scholars who claim that the development of baptism "in the name of the Father, and of the Son, and of the Holy Ghost" is a post-Apostolic Age interpolation and corruption, and that the "Trinitarian" clause in Matthew 28:19 was added in the 2nd/3rd century. They cite as evidence that no record exists in the New Testament of someone being baptised with the Trinitarian formula, using literal interpretation. They also consider the Didache untrustworthy, citing a lack of secondary manuscripts and a later date (although the text has been dated a century earlier than Oneness scholars admit, and has a second, Latin copy). While these views support those who baptise in Jesus' name, this point is not heavily contested. Those who assume the authenticity of Matthew 28:19 believe that the command is correctly fulfilled by baptizing "in the name of Jesus Christ."

== Trinitarian views ==
The views of mainstream or Trinitarian Christianity to Jesus' name baptism is varied.

=== Roman Catholicism ===
The Roman Catholic Church states that only Trinitarian baptisms are valid. While it does consider other baptismal formulae to be acceptable, since they were accepted by theologians of the past, the key requirement is that the baptism must have been performed by a church which (or, a person who) believes in the Trinity. Pope Nicholas I wrote to the Bulgarians that a person is not to be rebaptised who has already been baptised "in the name of the Holy Trinity or in the name of Christ only".

=== Protestantism ===
Martin Luther in his Prelude on the Babylonian Captivity of the Church describes disagreements over the wording of the baptism as "pedantry," arguing that baptism "truly saves in whatever way it is administered, if only it is administered not in the name of man, but in the name of the Lord." On baptisms specifically in the name of Jesus, Luther notes, "it is certain the apostles used this formula in baptizing, as we read in the Acts of the Apostles," citing Acts 2:38; 10:48; and 19:5.

Among other Trinitarian Christians, specifically Protestants, the Baptists states in the Standard Confession of Faith that baptisms in "the name of Our Lord Jesus Christ" is an alternative valid manner.

Both statements by Luther and Baptists predates Oneness Pentecostal theological underpinnings as Trinitarians, by their understanding on Jesus' authority in contrast with Oneness theology).

== Notable adherents ==
- All Oneness Pentecostals, who adhere to a nontrinitarian view of the Godhead, baptise using the name of Jesus Christ for the remission of a confessing believer's sins.

== See also ==
- Baptism
- Oneness Christology
- Nontrinitarianism
- Oneness Pentecostalism
- United Pentecostal Church International
- Swedenborgianism
