= Urshan Graduate School of Theology =

Seminary in Missouri, U.S.

Coordinates: 38.8025°N 90.3647°W

- Type: Private University
- Established: 2001; 25 years ago
- Accreditation: HLC, ATS
- Religious affiliation: United Pentecostal Church International
- Academic affiliations: Association of Theological Schools
- Chair: Michael Ensey
- President: Brent Coltharp
- Dean: David Johnson
- Total staff: 4 (2023)
- Students: 88 (Fall 2023)
- Location: Wentzville, Missouri, US
- Campus: 43 acres (17 ha); Large suburb
- Colors: Blue and white
- Website: ugst.edu

Urshan Graduate School of Theology (UGST) is a nontrinitarian Christian seminary operated by the United Pentecostal Church International (UPCI) in Wentzville, Missouri. It opened in 2001 as a Oneness Pentecostal institution and also offers undergraduate programs through Urshan University.

== Students ==
In Fall 2023, 88 students were enrolled at UGST. Students are not required to be members of the United Pentecostal Church International, but it is loyal to the teachings of that organization. Faculty and staff must subscribe to the biblical doctrines outlined in the Articles of Faith of the UPCI.

== History ==
Urshan Graduate School of Theology is named for Andrew Urshan and the legacy of the Oneness doctrine and visionary teaching that he handed down through his son, Nathaniel. In April 1998, Timothy Dugas, pastor of The Sanctuary in Missouri, formed an ad hoc committee to study the feasibility of the graduate school. Between April 1998 and the October 1998 meeting of the UPCI General Board, the ad hoc committee developed a proposal for the General Board.

In October 1998, the UPCI General Board, augmented with additional personnel, creating a steering committee under the auspices of Arless Glass, superintendent of the Division of Education. In January 1999, a second proposal was made to the UPCI General Board to determine if the project should go forward. In the summer of 1999, the steering committee chose its chairperson to be Jesse Williams, who has served as chairperson from that time to 2007. Under Jesse Williams's direction, a resolution was made to the October 1999 UPCI General Conference in session at Nashville, Tennessee. After relevant debate, the gathered ministers of the United Pentecostal Church voted to found the Urshan Graduate School of Theology.

In 2000, at a meeting in St. Louis, Chairperson Williams continued to lead the Board of Trustees, which was formed at that time. Some significant events took place at the January meeting. The board selected David Bernard as its first president and Nathaniel Urshan as the chancellor of what would be called the Urshan Graduate School of Theology. These officers were installed at the October conference. The board hired James Littles Jr. as vice president; he did considerable organizational work to ready the graduate school to open its doors. The board of trustees and the president officially installed the founding faculty (James A. Littles Jr., David S. Norris, Raymond Crownover, and Gerald L. Truman) at the convocation on August 29, 2001.

In 2009, President David Bernard was elected General Superintendent of the United Pentecostal Church International.

In 2010, Urshan Graduate School of Theology received full accreditation from the Association of Theological Schools (ATS) for the maximum initial period of five years.

In the summer of 2011, Gateway College of Evangelism offered for Urshan Graduate School of Theology (UGST) to acquire Gateway in order to start a new undergraduate program. At the 2011 United Pentecostal Church General Conference, the General Board accepted the proposal for UGST to absorb Gateway. On November 23, 2011, the new institution's name Urshan College was announced. As a Christian seminary, rather than offering degrees solely in theology (like a Bible College), Urshan University offers the Bachelor of Arts degree in several majors. As part of UGST, it is owned and operated by the United Pentecostal Church International and has a Oneness Pentecostal identity.

== Academics ==
UGST offers six certificates: Apostolic Studies, Biblical Studies (NT), Historical Studies, Intercultural Studies, Pastoral Care and Counseling, and UPCI-Endorsed Chaplains. It offers three master's degrees: Master of Divinity, Master of Arts in Christian Ministry, and Master of Theological Studies. Beginning in Fall 2024, UGST also offers a Doctor of Ministry (D.Min) program.

=== Accreditation ===
In 2010, Urshan Graduate School of Theology received full accreditation from the Association of Theological Schools (ATS) for the maximum initial period of five years.

On July 25, 2020, the Higher Learning Commission granted Urshan Graduate School of Theology and Urshan University regional accreditation.

== Center for the Study of Oneness Pentecostalism ==
The Center for the Study of Oneness Pentecostalism contains the archives for the United Pentecostal Church International, Urshan University, and Urshan Graduate School of Theology. The Center is located on Urshan's campus.

== See also ==
- Urshan University
- United Pentecostal Church International
- Urshan Gateway Library
