= Pentecostal Assemblies of Jesus Christ =

- Classification: Western Christian
- Orientation: Pentecostal
- Theology: Oneness Pentecostalism
- Polity: Episcopal
- Region: United States of America Philippines
- Headquarters: USA
- Origin: 1931, Columbus, Ohio
- Merger of: Apostolic Churches of Jesus Christ and Pentecostal Assemblies of the World
- Separations: United Pentecostal Church (UPCI), Pentecostal Assemblies of the World (PAW), International Circle of Faith (ICOF), Apostolic Churches International (ACI), Apostolic Ministerial Fellowship (AMF)
- Congregations: est. 50
- Members: est. 5,000
- Ministers: 85

The Pentecostal Assemblies of Jesus Christ (PAJC) is an independent association of Oneness Pentecostal churches, primarily located in the United States. Historically they have had members across the U.S. and abroad. They were formally organized in 1931. The original headquarters were located in Columbus, Ohio, later moved to St. Louis, Missouri, and then to Cleveland, Ohio. Today they are in Reesville, Ohio.

The PAJC consider themselves to be a continuation of the great revival that began on the day of Pentecost at Jerusalem, AD 33. They believe their doctrines to be founded upon the foundation of the apostles and prophets, Jesus Christ being their chief cornerstone.

== History ==
The Pentecostal Assemblies of Jesus Christ (PAJC) is one of the oldest active Oneness Pentecostal organizations in the world. Two of the largest Oneness Pentecostal organizations, United Pentecostal Church International and Pentecostal Assemblies of the World, were once part of the Pentecostal Assemblies of Jesus Christ and a third, the International Circle of Faith, traces its roots to the PAJC. All of these groups trace their roots to a revival in 1906 (the Azusa Street Revival) which has become synonymous with the Pentecostal movement. According to Pentecostal historian Morris Golder, in 1931 a unity conference with representatives from four Oneness Pentecostalism organizations met in Columbus, Ohio, in an attempt to bring more Oneness organizations under the same banner. This attempt was partially successful.

The Pentecostal Ministerial Alliance ministers voted to merge with The Apostolic Church of Jesus Christ, but the terms of the proposed merger were not accepted by the ministers of The Apostolic Church of Jesus Christ. Ministers from the Apostolic Church of Jesus Christ and the Pentecostal Assemblies of the World withdrew from their respective organizations and formed a new organization in November 1931. They adopted the name of The Pentecostal Assemblies of Jesus Christ (PAJC).

The PAJC and the Pentecostal Churches Inc. (PCI) merged in 1945, forming what is now called the United Pentecostal Church (UPCI). According to Pentecostal historian Dr. Bernie L. Wade, in August 1946, a group of brethren became dissatisfied with the merger with the United Pentecostal Church, revived the original charter of the PAJC and reorganized the group.

In the spring of 1948 the Churches of the Lord Jesus Christ met with the brethren of the PAJC and proposal a merger. In August, 1948 the merger became complete. At that time a proposal was issued to the new secretary, J. Frank Wilson, to make an amendment that both charters be dropped. This action was never taken and both charters lay idle until the reviving of the charter came about forming the Assemblies of Jesus Christ.

The old charter of the PAJC again lay idle until the year of 1955. Then a group of ministers led by Bishop Carl Angle (Nashville, Tennessee), Bishop Ray Cornell (Pastor of Apostolic Faith Church of God, Cleveland, Ohio) and Bishop C. B. Gillespie (Fairmont, West Virginia) went to the State of Ohio and took out a charter known as the PAJC, Inc. The PAJC, Inc. is still chartered in the state of Ohio. They believe themselves to be Oneness in doctrine and teachings, and believe that they use only the Bible as their guide book.

The new headquarters was established (using the strength of Bishop Ray O. Cornell's 2500 member Apostolic Faith Church of God) in Cleveland, Ohio (established in 1932). Bishop Ray Cornell, Bishop Carl Angle, and Bishop Charles B. Gillespie became the catalysts to the recharter effort. During the 1950s and 1960s the group's headquarters was at 2050 West 55th Street. The group grew through an aggressive recruitment effort spearheaded by national evangelist Carl Angle. It also grew by a number of mergers with other groups who were using the PAJC name. Most notable is the Southeast PAJC with Bishop J. T. Bass and the PAJC of Knoxville, Iowa where the group's printing presses were housed and publications were printed.
