= Urshan University =

Christian college in Florissant, Missouri

Coordinates: 38.801°N 90.366°W

- Former names: Gateway College of Evangelism (1968-2012), Urshan College (2012-2024)
- Motto: "To Do Justly And to Love Mercy and to Walk Humbly With Your God"
- Type: Private university, Christian college
- Established: 1968; 58 years ago
- Parent institution: Urshan Graduate School of Theology
- Accreditation: HLC, ATS
- Religious affiliation: United Pentecostal Church International
- Chair: Michael Ensey
- President: Brent Coltharp
- Dean: Tony McCall
- Total staff: 84 (2022)
- Students: 473 (2022)
- Location: Wentzville, Missouri, US
- Campus: 43 acres (17 ha); Large suburb
- Colors: Blue and white
- Website: urshan.edu

Urshan University, formerly known as Urshan College and Gateway College of Evangelism, is a nontrinitarian Christian college in Wentzville, Missouri. It is owned and operated by the United Pentecostal Church International (UPCI). In 2012, the college was acquired by Urshan Graduate School of Theology, through which it offers graduate programs.

== History ==
The founding of a Bible college in the St. Louis area was initiated by Harry Branding (superintendent of the Missouri District for the United Pentecostal Church International), who formed a committee to look into this possibility. This committee presented the idea to the Missouri District Board. On July 13, 1966, the district passed a resolution to create such a Bible college. The next year the bylaws were chosen and the college was given the name Gateway College of Evangelism.

On September 13, 1968, Gateway College officially opened at 3155 Charbonier Road in Florissant, Missouri. Three years later, the college purchased the former St. Stanislaus Seminary at 700 Howdershell Road.

After four decades, President Darrel Johns led the school through a transition to UPCI ownership. After many months of collaboration, the UPCI General Board approved a plan for Urshan Graduate School of Theology to acquire Gateway College and start a new undergraduate Christian college. On July 1, 2012, the transition was complete. At this point, Urshan College began to be operated jointly with Urshan Graduate School of Theology, under the governance of the Urshan Board of Directors and President David K. Bernard.

In January 2018, Bernard submitted his resignation as president of Urshan College and Urshan Graduate School of Theology. While the board of directors conducted a search for a new president for the Urshan System, Executive Vice President Jennie Russell served as interim president. In November 2018, the board of directors selected Brent Coltharp to serve as president effective January 2019, and Jennie Russell returned to her role as executive vice president.

== Academics ==
Urshan University offers a certificate in Theological and Ministerial Studies; associate's degrees in General Studies and Sociology; and bachelor's degrees in Business Administration, Human Resource Management, Human Services, Religious/Sacred Music, Theological and Ministerial Studies, Music, and Communication and Media Studies. It also offers distance learning in 8-week and 16-week long courses, offering a certificate in Apostolic Studies, an associate's in General Studies, and bachelor's in Christian Ministry, Organizational Leadership, and Human Services.

On July 25, 2020, the Higher Learning Commission granted Urshan Graduate School of Theology and Urshan University regional accreditation.

== Enrollment ==
In Fall 2022, the school's enrollment was 473 students. The student body is 41% male and 59% female; 82% are full-time and 18% are part-time; 69% are at least partly on campus while 31% are fully distance learners; 72% are white or Caucasian, 14% are Hispanic, 4% are Black or African-American, 4% are two or more races, 1% are Asian, 1% are American Indian or Alaskan Native, and 2% are unreported.

== Location ==
Urshan is located in St. Charles County, Missouri. The college relocated from Florissant, Missouri, to Wentzville, Missouri, kicking off the 2019–2020 school year on the new campus. The campus, formerly a CenturyLink office complex, consists of five buildings sitting on 43 acres of land.

The Center for the Study of Oneness Pentecostalism is also located on Urshan's campus. The Center contains the archives for the United Pentecostal Church International, Urshan University, and Urshan Graduate School of Theology.
