= Oneness Pentecostalism =

Nontrinitarian religious movement

Oneness Pentecostalism (also known as Apostolic Pentecostalism, Oneness Apostolicism, Jesus' Name Pentecostalism, or the Oneness movement) is a nontrinitarian movement of Pentecostal Christianity that emphasizes the absolute oneness of God and the full deity of Jesus Christ. It teaches that God is a singular divine spirit—undivided and without distinction of persons—who reveals himself in various ways, including as Father, Son, and Holy Spirit. This theology is often categorized by scholars as a form of Modalistic Monarchianism, though Oneness theologians have sought to distinguish their beliefs from historical Sabellianism and Patripassianism.

Oneness Pentecostal soteriology emphasizes repentance, full-submersion water baptism in the name of Jesus Christ, and baptism in the Holy Spirit with the evidence of speaking in other tongues, which together constitutes the new birth experience. Many Oneness Pentecostal groups also promote holiness standards in dress, grooming, and conduct, which are understood as outward expressions of inward spiritual transformation and obedience to biblical commands.

The Oneness Pentecostal movement first emerged in North America in the early 20th century following doctrinal disputes within the nascent Finished Work Pentecostal movement. It has since grown into a global movement with an estimated 30 million adherents worldwide. It was often referred to as the Jesus Only movement in its early days, which may be misleading as it does not deny the existence of the Father or Holy Spirit.

== History ==
The first Pentecostals were Holiness Pentecostals teaching three works of grace: the new birth, receipt of entire sanctification, and baptism with the Holy Spirit accompanied by glossolalia. They specifically taught the Wesleyan Methodist doctrines of outward holiness and Christian perfection—an instantaneous, definitive second work of grace in which the baptized person's soul is cleansed of its original sin and made perfect in love. Finished Work Pentecostals broke away from the Holiness Pentecostals, rejecting the Wesleyan Methodist doctrine of entire sanctification as an instantaneous, second definite work of grace, and instead teaching only two experiences: conversion and baptism with the Holy Spirit. The Finished Work Pentecostal branch further partitioned into Trinitarian and nontrinitarian branches, with the latter forming Oneness Pentecostalism. The Oneness Pentecostal movement began in 1913 as the result of doctrinal disputes within the nascent Finished Work Pentecostal movement, specifically within the Assemblies of God, the first Finished Work Pentecostal denomination.

=== Movement beginnings ===
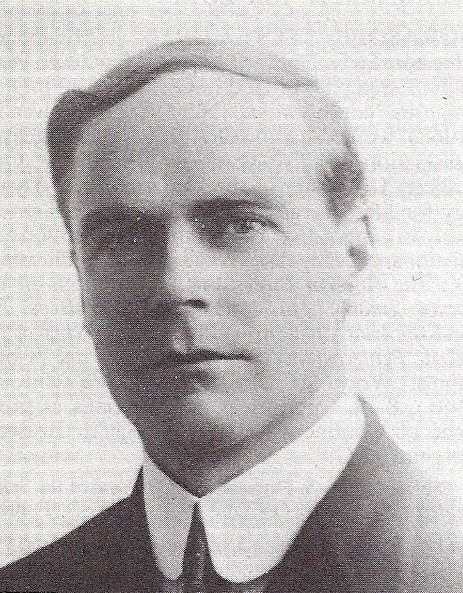
William Howard Durham, the initiator of Finished Work Pentecostalism whose Christocentric theology laid the groundwork for the later emergence of Oneness Pentecostalism

The emergence of Oneness Pentecostalism as a distinct movement can be traced to the doctrinal split between Finished Work Pentecostalism and Holiness Pentecostalism, known as the "Finished Work" controversy. The controversy arose from a sermon by William Howard Durham titled The Finished Work of Calvary. In this message, Durham rejected the doctrine of entire sanctification as a separate and subsequent experience to justification, asserting instead that both were accomplished simultaneously at conversion. He grounded his teaching in the belief that the crucifixion of Jesus constituted a "finished work," rendering unnecessary any additional second work of grace. Durham emphasized that Jesus functioned as both sanctifier and baptizer with the Holy Spirit, with all spiritual benefits flowing from the completed work at Calvary through identification with him. Although Durham died before the emergence of Oneness theology, this Christocentric emphasis picked up in the Finished Work Pentecostal movement would later influence theological frameworks within the Oneness Pentecostal movement, particularly its doctrine of the oneness of God.

After Durham's death, many Finished Work Pentecostals remained expectant for further restoration of apostolic teachings and anticipated a greater "Latter Rain." In July 1912, Maria Woodworth-Etter was invited by Dallas pastor F. F. Bosworth to hold revival services at his church. Although initially scheduled for two weeks, the meetings extended for over five months, with nightly services drawing significant crowds. According to reports in Word and Witness, a Pentecostal periodical edited by E. N. Bell, more than 5,000 people attended the meetings, which featured reports of miraculous healings and over 1,200 individuals embracing the Pentecostal experience. These events contributed to a growing sense among many Pentecostals that a new work of God was imminent.

Following the success of the Dallas meetings, Canadian preacher R. J. Scott approached Woodworth-Etter with the idea of organizing a large-scale revival focused on spiritual unity. The resulting event, known as the Apostolic Faith World-Wide Camp Meeting, was held in Arroyo Seco, California beginning on April 15, 1913. Organizers anticipated that God would "deal with them, giving them a unity and power that we have not yet known." The meeting opened with a sermon on Jeremiah 31:22, proclaiming that God was imminently about to perform a "new thing" during the gathering. A few days later, during a scheduled baptismal service, Canadian minister R.E. McAlister preached a "new revelation" (considered a theological restoration by those who adopted the teaching) that a baptismal formula in "the name of Jesus" only was to be preferred over the mainstream Nicene Christian Trinitarian formula ("Father, Son, and Holy Ghost") found in Matthew 28:19, pointing rather to Acts 2:38 ("in the name of Jesus") as the authoritative model. The statement caused immediate controversy, and Frank Denny, a Pentecostal missionary to China, jumped on the platform in an attempt to censor McAlister and avoid being associated with Joshua Sykes who was baptizing in that way.

However, McAlister's revelation inspired a young minister named John G. Schaepe. After all-night prayer and bible study, he proclaimed the following day that he had also received a private revelation against Trinitarian baptism. His judgment was accepted by several others in the camp and given further theological development by a minister named Frank Ewart. Ewart also continued to promote the theology of the movement through his periodical Meat in Due Season and became the primary developer of the doctrine in its early stages. Another attendee of the camp meeting, evangelist Glenn Cook took the message with him back to the Midwestern United States. Although early proponents described their doctrinal insights as a "revelation," both Oneness and Trinitarian Pentecostals affirmed that all doctrine must be grounded in Scripture, not independent of it.

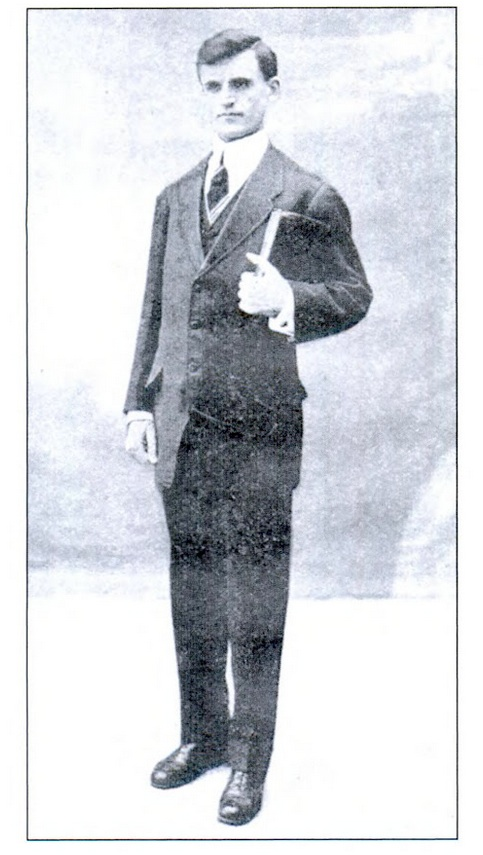
Andrew D. Urshan, an early leader in the Oneness Pentecostal movement

A year later, on April 15, 1914, Ewart and Cook publicly baptized each other specifically in "the name of the Lord Jesus Christ" in a tank set up in Ewart's crusade tent. This is considered to be the historical point when Oneness Pentecostalism emerged as a distinct movement. As it grew, the movement added prominent leaders as G. T. Haywood, the African-American pastor of a large Assemblies of God church in Indianapolis; Franklin Small from Winnipeg, Canada; and Andrew Urshan, a Persian evangelist. The soteriology of the Oneness movement was primarily outlined by these three men, who identified Acts 2:38 as the primary plan of salvation.

A number of ministers claimed they were baptizing in Jesus' name before 1914, including Urshan and Small. Urshan claimed to have baptized others in Jesus' name as early as 1910, and Small claimed to have baptized 30 in Jesus' name only at the Annual Pentecostal Convention in Winnipeg in November 1913. In addition, Charles Parham was recorded baptizing using a similar formula during the Azusa Street revival; until 1914, both Parham and William J. Seymour baptized using this Christological formula but repudiated the new movement's nontrinitarian teachings amidst the controversy as they baptized as Christocentric Trinitarians. Other baptisms in the name of Jesus were performed as far back as the 19th century, prior to the development of Oneness Pentecostal theology—though some used justification similar to that of the later Oneness Pentecostals.

In the Assemblies of God, the re-baptisms in only Jesus' name caused a backlash from many Trinitarians. Particularly controversial was the re-baptism of E. N. Bell—who was the chairman of the Assemblies of God at the time—by Indianapolis pastor L.V. Roberts at a camp meeting in Jackson, TN in 1915. Though he remained Trinitarian, the re-baptism remained a source of confusion over his views. The dispute between Oneness and Trinitarian Pentecostals on baptism and the Godhead became known as the "New Issue", a term widely used during the controversy. It became an issue in the AG's General Council of 1914, and in 1915, the General Council of the Assemblies of God specifically focused on the issue, resulting in an "appeal for tolerance" by the denomination. The issue finally came to a head in October 1916 at the fourth general council, where the mostly Trinitarian leadership, fearing that the new movement might overtake their organization, drew up a doctrinal statement affirming the truth of Trinitarianism. When the resulting Assemblies of God Statement of Fundamental Truths was adopted, a third of the denomination's ministers left to form Oneness congregations. After this separation, most Oneness believers became relatively isolated from other Pentecostals and mainstream Nicene Christianity more broadly.

=== Forming organizations ===
Several small Oneness ministerial groups formed during and after the controversy between 1914 and 1916. Many of these groups ultimately merged into the Pentecostal Assemblies of the World (PAW), while others remained independent (e.g., the Apostolic Faith Mission Church of God).

The early PAW was racially diverse: it had both strong African-American representation in the North and white representation in the South. The organization's headquarters was located in Indianapolis, and many of the organization's conferences were held in the North where segregation laws were not in place. However, as the organization grew, divisions occurred within the Pentecostal Assemblies of the World as there were reports of racial tension in the organization, particularly over the many African Americans that held significant leadership positions. White Southerners expressed objections to the logistical and financial burdens associated with annual travel to the North, and Haywood signed all ministerial credentials as the PAW's general secretary.

Amid these tensions, White Southerners broke away from the PAW in 1924, and three new organizations were formed by 1925: the Apostolic Churches of Jesus Christ, Emmanuel's Church in Jesus Christ, and the Pentecostal Ministerial Alliance. The former two later merged to become the Apostolic Church of Jesus Christ, and the latter became the Pentecostal Church, Inc. In 1945, a merger of two predominantly-white Oneness groups—the Pentecostal Church, Inc., and the Pentecostal Assemblies of Jesus Christ—resulted in the formation of the United Pentecostal Church International (UPCI). Toronto pastor Howard Goss became the first UPCI general superintendent after previously holding credentials with the PCI and preaching the Oneness message, despite being affiliated with the Pentecostal Assemblies of Canada until 1937. Starting with 521 member-churches, it became the largest and most influential Oneness Pentecostal organization, reporting a membership of over 6.1 million in 2025.

Oneness theology has also influenced independent Oneness Pentecostal movements that, while not officially affiliated with major denominations, embrace Jesus' name baptism and the infilling of the Holy Ghost as central to salvation.

=== Contemporary movement ===
Estimates suggest there are approximately 30 million Oneness Pentecostals worldwide. Demographically, the movement is notably diverse: around 40% of adherents are Black, 30% are Asian, 20% are Hispanic and Latino, and approximately 9% are White.

==== United States and Europe ====
A majority of Black Pentecostal churches in both the United States and United Kingdom remain Oneness Pentecostal. In Great Britain particularly, there is a substantial presence of Oneness African-Caribbean churches, originating from Oneness Pentecostal influence in the poor urban centers of North America and the villages of the Caribbean islands. Additionally, Oneness Pentecostalism has seen growth in Western Europe through the evangelistic efforts of African organizations.

==== South America ====
The Oneness movement has grown throughout South America. The United Pentecostal Church of Colombia (the national branch of the UPCI) is the second-largest denomination in the country behind the Catholic Church and the largest Protestant denomination with over one million constituents, whereas countries such as Brazil, Argentina, and Chile have seen indigenous growth complemented by denominations from the United States.

==== Asia ====
The Asian Pacific region has seen substantial growth by Oneness Pentecostal organizations, especially in countries such as Indonesia and Australia. Particularly, in the Philippines, there are over two million adherents across more than 120 different Oneness organizations. In China, True Jesus Church became the largest indigenous Christian group in the country in 1949 and has a membership estimated at least 500,000, possibly reaching up to one million. TJC has also seen extensive growth in Singapore, the Philippines, Australia, Europe, and the Americas. Other Oneness Pentecostal groups account for at least one million adherents in China, though estimates are difficult to determine.

== Theology ==
Oneness Pentecostalism has a historical precedent in the Modalistic Monarchianism of the second and third centuries. The early movement affirmed two central aspects of later Oneness belief:

1. There is one indivisible God with no distinction of persons or components within God's eternal essence.
2. Jesus was the manifestation, human personification, and/or incarnation of the same singular God.

Oneness Pentecostals contend, based on Colossians 2:9, that the concept of God's personhood is reserved for the immanent and incarnate presence of Jesus only.

=== Doctrine of God ===
Oneness theology maintains that God is a singular spirit who is absolutely and indivisibly unitary, not three persons, individuals, or minds. They contend that the terms "Father", "Son", and "Holy Ghost" (or "Holy Spirit") are titles reflecting the different personal manifestations of God in the universe. To Oneness believers, the Father, Son, and Holy Spirit are three manifestations of one personal God.

Oneness theologians often quote a phrase used by early pioneers of the movement: "God was manifested as the Father in creation, the Son in redemption, and the Holy Ghost in emanation." However, Oneness theologian David Norris points out that this does not mean that Oneness Pentecostals believe that God can only be one of those manifestations at a time, which may be suggested by the quote. Oneness theologian David K. Bernard also teaches that God is not limited to these three manifestations.

According to Oneness theology, the Father and the Holy Spirit are the same personal God. It teaches that the term "Holy Spirit" is a descriptive title for God manifesting himself through the broader Christian Church. These two titles—as well as others—do not reflect divisible persons within the Godhead, but rather two different ways in which the one God reveals himself to his creatures. Thus, when the Old Testament (Hebrew Bible) speaks of "the Lord God and his Spirit" in Isaiah 48:16, it does not indicate two distinct persons, according to Oneness theology. Instead, "the Lord" means God in all his glory and transcendence, while "his Spirit" refers to his Holy Spirit that moved upon and spoke to the Hebrew prophets. Bernard states that this passage does not imply two persons any more than the numerous scriptural references to a man and his spirit or soul (such as in Luke 12:19) imply two "persons" existing within one body. Bernard asserts that it is unbiblical to describe God as a plurality of persons in any sense of the word, "regardless of what persons meant in ancient church history."

Oneness Pentecostals maintain that early Christianity taught a form of strict monotheism consistent with their view, contrasting their views not only with Trinitarianism but equally with the theology espoused by Latter-day Saints (who believe that Jesus is a separate god from the Father and the Spirit), and by Jehovah's Witnesses and Unitarians (who deny the full deity of Jesus and view him as a created being distinct from and subordinate to the Father). The Oneness position as nontrinitarian places them at odds with most mainstream Nicene Christian denominations, and some apologetics ministries and writers have categorized Oneness groups as cults. However, David A. Reed, a Trinitarian scholar at Wycliffe College and a leading academic authority on Oneness Pentecostalism, disagrees. He contends in his book "In Jesus' Name": The History and Beliefs of Oneness Pentecostals that the movement should be considered theologically heterodox, rather than heretical or cultish.

==== Accusations of Modalism and Arianism ====
Oneness believers are frequently identified with Modalism. Additionally, some critics—usually individuals rather than denominational bodies—have also alleged that Oneness theology bears resemblance to Arianism or Semi-Arianism. While Bernard acknowledges similarities between Oneness theology, Modalistic Monarchianism, and the teachings of Sabellius, he rejects associations with Patripassianism, Arianism or Subordinationism that have historically been linked to some modalistic views. Bernard argues that Oneness theology represents a distinct, biblical form of modalism that differs from some traditional formulations and interpretations historically deemed heretical.

=== Son of God ===
According to Oneness theology, the Son of God did not exist (in any substantial sense) before the incarnation of Jesus of Nazareth except as the logos (or word) of God. They believe that the humanity of Jesus did not exist before the Incarnation, but that Jesus pre-existed in his deity (not his humanity) as the eternal God. This belief is supported by the lack of Jesus' incarnate presence anywhere in the Old Testament (Hebrew Bible). Thus, Oneness Pentecostals believe that the title "Son" only applied to the Christ when he became flesh on earth. The Father in this theology embodies the divine attributes of the Godhead, and the Son embodies the human aspects. Oneness Pentecostals believe that Jesus and the Father are one essential person, though operating in different modes.

Oneness author W. L. Vincent writes, "The argument against the 'Son being his own Father' is a red herring. It should be evident that Oneness theology acknowledges a clear distinction between the Father and Son–in fact this has never been disputed by any Christological view that I am aware of."

==== The Word ====
Oneness theology holds that "the Word" in John 1:1 was God's mind or plan. Oneness Pentecostals believe that the Word was not a separate person from God but that it was the plan of God and God itself. Bernard writes in his book The Oneness View of Jesus Christ,

In the Old Testament, God's Word (dabar) was not a distinct person but was God speaking, or God disclosing Himself (Psalm 107:20; Isaiah 55:11). To the Greeks, the Word (logos) was not a distinct divine person, but reason as the controlling principle of the universe. The noun logos could mean thought (unexpressed word) as well as speech or action (expressed word). In John 1, the Word is God's self-revelation or self-disclosure. Before the Incarnation, the Word was the unexpressed thought, plan, reason, or mind of God.

Bernard additionally claims that the Greek word pros (translated as "with" in John 1:1) could also be translated as "pertaining to", meaning that John 1:1 could also be translated as (in his view) "The Word pertained to God and the Word was God."

In the incarnation, Oneness believers hold that God put the Word (which was his divine plan) into action by manifesting himself in the form of the man Jesus, and thus "the Word became flesh". As an extension, Oneness Pentecostalism argues that the incarnation was a singular event unlike anything God has done prior or will ever do again. Oneness Pentecostals believe that the Word of John 1:1 does not imply a second pre-existent, divine person but that the Word is simply the plan of God, which was put into action through the incarnation.

==== The dual nature of Christ ====
When discussing the incarnation, Oneness theologians and authors often refer to a concept known as the dual nature of Christ, which is understood as the union of human and divine natures in the man Jesus. Bernard describes this concept in his book The Oneness of God, stating that Jesus "is both Spirit and flesh, God and man, Father and Son. On his human side, He is the Son of man; on his divine side, He is the Son of God and is the Father dwelling in the flesh." Oneness Pentecostals see this not as two persons in one body but instead as two natures united in one person: Jesus. Oneness believers see the mystery referred to in 1 Timothy 3:16 as referencing this concept of two natures being united in the one person of Jesus.

Although the Oneness belief in the union of the divine and human into one person in Jesus is similar to the Chalcedonian formula, Chalcedonians disagree sharply with them over their opposition to Trinitarian dogma. Chalcedonians see Jesus as a single person uniting God the Son—the eternal second person of the Trinity—with human nature. Oneness believers, on the other hand, see Jesus as one single person uniting the one God himself with human nature as the Son of God.

=== Scripture ===
Oneness Pentecostalism subscribes to the doctrine of sola scriptura in common with mainstream Pentecostals and other Protestants. They view the Bible as the inspired Word of God, and as absolutely inerrant in its contents (though not necessarily in every translation). They specifically reject the conclusions of church councils such as the First Council of Nicaea and the Nicene Creed. They believe that mainstream Christians have been misled by long-held and unchallenged "traditions of men".

=== The name of Jesus ===
The overwhelming emphasis on the person of Jesus shapes the content of a theology based on experience among both Oneness and Trinitarian Pentecostals. In principle, the doctrinal emphasis on Jesus attributes all divine qualities and functions to the Christ. What might, therefore, be called a 'Christological maximalism' in the Pentecostal doctrine of God among Oneness Pentecostals leads to a factual substitution of the three divine persons with the single person of Jesus. At the same time, Trinitarian Pentecostals typically elevate Jesus from the second person of the Trinity to the central figure of Christian faith and worship.

Critics of Oneness theology commonly refer to its adherents as "Jesus Only", implying that they deny the existence of the Father and Holy Spirit. Most Oneness Pentecostals consider that term to be pejorative and a misrepresentation of their true beliefs on the issue. Oneness believers insist that while they do indeed believe in baptism only in the name of Jesus Christ, to describe them as "Jesus Only Pentecostals" implies a denial of the Father and Holy Spirit.

=== View of the Trinity ===
Oneness Pentecostals assert that the doctrine of the Trinity is not explicitly found in Scripture and view it as a post-biblical development. They argue that the concept of God as three co-equal persons is not explicitly taught in the Bible, noting the absence of terms such as "Trinity" or "persons" in reference to God in the Bible. Instead, they believe the doctrine emerged gradually over the first few centuries of the church and was formalized through creeds at the councils of Nicaea (325 AD) and Constantinople (381 AD).

This historical claim is not unique to Oneness Pentecostals. Some editions of the Oxford Dictionary of the Christian Church, Encyclopædia Britannica, and the Internet Encyclopedia of Philosophy, among others, note that Trinitarianism formally developed over the early centuries as a response to theological controversies. The Stanford Encyclopedia of Philosophy states that no Christian theologians were explicitly Trinitarian for the first three centuries, with a diverse range of views regarding the Father, Son, and Holy Spirit. Prominent biblical scholars such as James D.G. Dunn, Raymond E. Brown, N.T. Wright, and Larry Hurtado, affirm that while the New Testament portrays Jesus and the Holy Spirit in ways that laid the groundwork for later formalized Trinitarian theology, it does not present the fully developed doctrine. They describe the Trinity as a theological synthesis formed in the post-apostolic era, drawing on the New Testament's presentation of Jesus and the Spirit within a monotheistic framework.

Other scholars—including Bart Ehrman—argue that Trinitarian doctrine represents a theological departure from the unitarian monotheism of the earliest Christians (Jewish Christians). Ehrman, an agnostic historian of early Christianity, and Jewish scholar Géza Vermes contend that neither Jesus nor his earliest followers taught Trinitarian concepts and that the doctrine was a product of later reflection. Jewish scholars such as Daniel Boyarin, and Alan F. Segal have examined how Second Temple Jewish concepts—such as divine agency and the "two powers" tradition—provided theological categories that early Christians adapted in ways that eventually contributed to Trinitarian thought. Both Jewish scholars document how concepts of divine agency informed early Christian understandings of Jesus, but neither identifies the Trinity as a biblically or historically continuous doctrine.

Trinitarian theologians and apologists maintain that the doctrine represents a faithful synthesis of biblical revelation, developed more fully in response to early heresies and theological disputes. Figures such as Alister McGrath and Karl Rahner argue that the Trinity accurately expresses both the unity of God and the relational distinctions found in Scripture. Rahner, for instance, argued that "the economic Trinity is the immanent Trinity," proposing that God's self-revelation in salvation history corresponds to his eternal triune identity. They maintain that the Trinity, though not formulated in creedal terms during the apostolic era, accurately expresses the unity and distinction presented in Scripture.

=== Views of the early church ===
Scholars within the Oneness movement differ in their views on church history. Some church historians, such as Dr. Curtis Ward, Marvin Arnold, and William Chalfant, hold to a Successionist view, arguing that their movement has existed in every generation from the original day of Pentecost to the present day. Ward has proposed a theory of an unbroken Pentecostal church lineage, claiming to have chronologically traced its perpetuity throughout the church's history.

Others hold to a Restorationist view, believing that while the apostles and their church clearly taught Oneness doctrine and the Pentecostal experience, the early apostolic church went into apostasy, which eventually developed into the institutional forms seen in Roman Catholicism. For them, the contemporary Oneness Pentecostal movement began in America in the early 20th century during the latter days of the Azusa Street Revival. Restorationists such as Bernard and Norris deny any direct link between the church of the Apostolic age and the current Oneness movement, believing that modern Oneness Pentecostalism is a total restoration originating from a step-by-step separation within Protestantism culminating in the final restoration of the early apostolic church.

Both Successionists and Restorationists among Oneness Pentecostals assert that the early apostolic church believed in the Oneness and Jesus name baptism doctrines. David K. Bernard, a leading Oneness scholar, has written extensively on this subject in works such as The Oneness of God and A History of Christian Doctrine. Bernard traces Oneness adherents back to the first converted Jews of the Apostolic Age and asserts that there is no evidence of these converts having any difficulty comprehending the Christian Church's teachings and integrating them with their existing Judaic beliefs. In the post-apostolic era, Bernard contends that the earliest believers, including Hermas, Clement of Rome, Polycarp, Polycrates, Ignatius, and Irenaeus either held to a Oneness-like view of God or followed an "economic Trinity" model that did not reflect eternal personal distinctions within the Godhead. Bernard theorizes that the majority of all believers were Oneness adherents until the time of Tertullian, quoting Tertullian as writing against Praxeas:

The simple, indeed (I will not call them unwise or unlearned), who always constitute the majority of believers, are startled at the dispensation (of the Three in One), on the very ground that their very Rule of Faith withdraws them from the world's plurality of gods to the one only true God; not understanding that, although He is the one only God, He must yet be believed in with His own economy. The numerical order and distribution of the Trinity, they assume to be a division of the Unity.

As part of his broader critique, Bernard briefly references 19th-century Presbyterian minister Alexander Hislop, who associated Trinitarian doctrine and other early Christian practices with pagan religious influence. Contemporary scholars widely reject Hislop's claims as unreliable; however, Bernard's core argument rests not on Hislop but on patristic sources and the biblical absence of explicitly tri-personal language. Oneness theologians such as Norris have also advanced alternative lines of argument based on biblical exegesis and early Christian texts.

In contrast to Bernard's theory, Trinitarian scholars suggest the writings of Ignatius and Irenaeus teach an eternal Trinity, though Norris disagrees with them in his book I AM: A Oneness Pentecostal Theology, arguing that writers like Ignatius should not be retroactively read through the lens of fourth-century Trinitarian orthodoxy.

== Soteriology ==
In common with most Protestant denominations, Oneness Pentecostal soteriology maintains that all people are born with a sinful nature, sin at a young age, and remain lost without hope of salvation unless they embrace the Gospel that Jesus made complete atonement for the sins of all people, which is the sole means of human redemption; and that salvation comes solely by grace through faith in Jesus. Oneness doctrine also teaches that true faith results in obedience, and that salvation is not only to profess faith but to demonstrate it as well in action. Oneness churches teach the following as the foundation of Christian conversion:

- repentance;
- water baptism in the name of Jesus Christ;
- baptism in the Holy Spirit with the evidence of speaking in tongues.

Oneness Pentecostals generally accept that these are the minimal requirements of conversion.

=== Grace and faith ===
Oneness Pentecostals maintain that no good works or obedience to the law can save anyone apart from God's grace. Furthermore, salvation comes solely through faith in Jesus; there is no salvation through any name or work other than his (Acts 4:12). Oneness teaching rejects interpretations that hold that salvation is given automatically to the elect; they believe that all humans are called to salvation, and "whosoever will, may come" (Revelation 22:17).

While salvation is indeed a gift in Oneness belief, it must be received. This reception of salvation is generally considered conversion and is accepted in most evangelical Protestant churches. The first mandate is true faith in Jesus, demonstrated by obedience to God's commands and a determination to submit to his will in every aspect of life. Oneness adherents reject the notion that one may be saved through what they call mental faith: mere belief in Jesus without life-changing repentance or obedience. Thus, they emphatically reject the idea that one is saved through praying the Sinner's prayer, but rather the true saving faith and change of life declared in scripture. Oneness Pentecostals have no issue with the prayer itself but deny that it alone represents saving faith, believing the Bible accordingly mandates repentance, baptism by water and spirit with receipt of the Holy Spirit as a manifestation of the spirit part of the rebirth experience and the actual, godly faith obeyed and done by the early Church's believers. Thus, one who has truly been saved will gladly submit to the biblical conditions for conversion. According to these believers, Jesus and the apostles taught that the new birth experience includes repentance and baptism in both water and God's Spirit.

=== Repentance ===
Oneness Pentecostals maintain that salvation is not possible without repentance. While repentance is, in part, godly sorrow for sin, it is as much a complete change of heart and mind toward God and his word. This is why Oneness churches expect a complete reformation of life in those who have become Christians.

=== Water baptism ===
Oneness Pentecostals believe that water baptism is an essential component of salvation, not merely a symbolic act. They cite Acts 2:38, where Peter says to "be baptized every one of you in the name of Jesus Christ for the remission of sins" as evidence that baptism is necessary for the forgiveness of sins. They also appeal to passages such as Mark 16:16 ("He that believeth and is baptized shall be saved") and John 3:5, where Jesus states, "Except a man be born of water and of the Spirit, he cannot enter into the kingdom of God," interpreting "born of water" as a direct reference to baptism.

Oneness Pentecostals reject the idea that baptism is a mere public declaration of faith, arguing that it plays an active role in salvation by uniting believers with Christ and applying his atoning blood. They cite Romans 6:3–4, which states that believers are "baptized into Christ" and "buried with him by baptism into death," as evidence that baptism is the moment when one is spiritually united with Christ's death, burial, and resurrection. Similarly, they reference 1 Peter 3:21, which states that "baptism doth also now save us," reinforcing their belief that baptism is not optional but an integral part of the salvation process. Oneness Pentecostals also insist that baptism must be preceded by faith and repentance, rejecting infant baptism and baptisms performed by compulsion.

This doctrinal emphasis on baptism as a salvific act is one of the key distinctions between Oneness Pentecostals and many other Protestant groups, which often view baptism as an outward testimony of an already completed salvation rather than an essential step in the process of being saved.

==== Baptismal mode ====
Oneness Pentecostal theology maintains the literal definition of baptism as being completely immersed in water. They believe that other modes have no biblical basis or are based upon inexact Old Testament rituals and that their mode is the only one described in the New Testament. The Articles of Faith of the UPCI state that "the scriptural mode of baptism is immersion and is only for those who have fully repented."

==== Baptismal formula ====
Oneness adherents believe that for water baptism to be valid, one must be baptized "in the name of Jesus Christ", rather than the Trinitarian baptismal formula "in the name of the Father, and of the Son, and of the Holy Spirit." This is referred to as the "Jesus' name doctrine". "Jesus' name" is a description used to refer to Oneness Pentecostals and their baptismal beliefs.

Oneness Pentecostals mainly center their belief around the baptismal formula found in Acts 2:38: "Repent, and be baptized every one of you in the name of Jesus Christ for the remission of sins; and ye shall receive the gift of the Holy Ghost." Other passages cited include:

- Acts 8:16 – Samaritans were baptized "in the name of the Lord Jesus."
- Acts 10:48 – Cornelius and his household were commanded to be baptized "in the name of the Lord."
- Acts 19:5 – Disciples of John the Baptist were re-baptized "in the name of the Lord Jesus."
- Acts 22:16 – Paul was baptized "calling on the name of the Lord"

Oneness Pentecostals assert that these five mentions of baptism in the Book of Acts were performed in the name of Jesus and that no Trinitarian formula is ever referred to therein. In addition, 1 Corinthians 1:13 is taken by Oneness Pentecostals to indicate baptism in Jesus' name as well; Oneness author William Arnold III explains their reasoning: "If we follow Paul's train of thought, his obvious implication is 'No, Christ was the one crucified for you and so you were baptized in the name of Christ.' So the believers at Corinth as well as those in Rome were baptized in Jesus' name."

Based on these New Testament accounts, Oneness proponents maintain that baptism in the name of Jesus Christ reflects the earliest apostolic tradition. They view the later emergence of the Trinitarian formula as a doctrinal innovation that diverged from the original practice. As additional support for their claim, Oneness Pentecostals also cite superseded editions of Britannica, the Catholic Encyclopedia, Interpreter's Bible, and various other scholars and encyclopedias to justify this claim. For example, James Hastings' Dictionary of the Bible states that "The original form of words was 'into the name of Jesus Christ' or 'the Lord Jesus.' Baptism into the name of the Trinity was a later development." Likewise, in Maurice A. Canney's An Encyclopaedia of Religions, it states that "Persons were baptized at first 'in the name of Jesus Christ' or 'in the name of the Lord Jesus'. Afterwards, with the development of the doctrine of the Trinity, they were baptized 'in the name of the Father and of the Son and of the Holy Ghost'". Norris explains that "there is a strong scholarly consensus that the earliest Christian baptism was practiced in Jesus' name."

The Didache, an early Christian manual of instruction generally dated by scholars to the late first or (less commonly) early second century AD, includes a reference to baptism "in the name of the Father, and of the Son, and of the Holy Spirit" (Didache 7:1). This text is cited by some Trinitarian theologians as early support for the threefold baptismal formula. However, the document also describes individuals being "baptized into the name of the Lord" (Didache 9:5), a construction that Oneness Pentecostals claim parallels references to baptism found in the book of Acts. Oneness Pentecostal writers such as David K. Bernard interpret references to baptism "in the name of" as pointing exclusively to the name of Jesus, and they highlight the absence of any recorded apostolic use of a triune formula.

Some Oneness writers have raised concerns about the Didache's reliability, noting that the only complete Greek manuscript, discovered in 1873, was dated to the 11th century (although an additional Latin manuscript was discovered in 1900). Trinitarian scholar Willy Rordorf summarizes scholarly conversation surrounding the baptismal formula in the Didache by stating that Didache 7:1 was likely a later interpolation and that Didache 9:5 "preserved the most ancient baptismal formula. At the beginning of Christianity, one baptized 'in the name of Jesus.'"

Mainstream Trinitarian Christians exegete "in the name of Jesus Christ" as by the "authority of Jesus," which denotes baptism in the name of the three persons of the Trinity. In response, Oneness Pentecostals have claimed that the wording of Acts 22:16 requires an oral invocation of the name of Jesus during baptism (calling on the name of the Lord). They also assert that the way one exercises the authority of Jesus is by using his name, pointing to the healing of the lame man at the Gate Beautiful in Acts 3 as an example of this.

Mainstream Trinitarian scholars such as Craig S. Keener, F. F. Bruce, Richard I. Pervo, Stephen G. Wilson, and Barclay M. Newman and Eugene A. Nida have—in contrast—contextually argued that this commandment was solely directed toward the audience of Jews that were being preached for conversion, and not as a universal commandment to Gentiles.

==== View of Matthew 28:19 ====
Oneness Pentecostals insist that there are no New Testament references to baptism by any other formula—save in Matthew 28:19, which most hold to be another reference to baptism in the name of Jesus. Although Matthew 28:19 seems to mandate a Trinitarian formula for baptism, Oneness theology avows that since the word "name" in the verse is singular, it must refer to Jesus, whose name they believe to be that of the Father, Son, and Holy Spirit. Oneness believers insist that all Bible's texts on the subject must be in complete agreement with each other; thus, they say that either the apostles disobeyed the command they had been given in Matthew 28:19 or they correctly fulfilled it by using the name of Jesus.

A minority of Oneness Pentecostals argue that the text of Matthew 28:19 is not original, quoting various scholars and the early Church historian Eusebius, who referred to this passage at least eighteen times in his works. Eusebius' text reads: "go and make disciples of all nations in my name, teaching them to observe all things whatsoever I commanded you." However, most Oneness believers accept the full Matthew 28:19 as an authentic part of the original text and interpret it through a Modalistic Christological lens.

=== Baptism of the Holy Spirit ===
Oneness Pentecostals believe that the baptism of the Holy Spirit is a free gift commanded for all. They believe that the baptism of the Holy Spirit is an essential component of salvation, asserting that receiving the Holy Spirit evidenced by speaking in tongues directly fulfills the New Testament mandate. This distinguishes their theology from classical Trinitarian Pentecostalism: while Oneness and Trinitarian Pentecostals emphasize the importance of Spirit baptism, they diverge on its role in salvation. Trinitarian Pentecostals, such as those in the Assemblies of God, teach that the baptism of the Holy Spirit is a subsequent experience meant for empowerment, not necessarily required for salvation. In contrast, Oneness Pentecostals maintain that one must be baptized in the Holy Spirit with the initial sign of speaking in tongues to be truly born again. Oneness Pentecostals cite biblical passages such as John 3:5 ("Except a man be born of water and of the Spirit, he cannot enter into the kingdom of God") and Romans 8:9 ("Now if any man have not the Spirit of Christ, he is none of his") to support their belief that Spirit baptism is a requirement for salvation.

Pentecostals—both Oneness and Trinitarian—maintain that the Holy Spirit experience denotes the genuine Christian Church and empowers the believer to accomplish God's will. Like most Pentecostals, Oneness believers maintain that the initial sign of the infilling Holy Spirit is speaking in tongues and that the New Testament mandates this as a minimal requirement. They equally recognize that speaking in tongues is a sign to unbelievers of the Holy Spirit's power and is to be actively sought after and utilized, especially in prayer. However, this initial manifestation of the Holy Spirit is seen as distinct from the gift of divers kinds of tongues mentioned in 1 Corinthians 12:10, which is given to selected spirit-filled believers as the Holy Spirit desires. Oneness adherents assert that receiving the Holy Spirit, evidenced by speaking in tongues, is necessary for salvation.

== Practices ==
=== Worship ===
In common with other Pentecostals, Oneness believers are known for their charismatic style of worship. Oneness Pentecostal worship is characterized by expressive congregational participation, including verbal praises, prayers, singing accompanied by musical instruments, and energetic preaching. They believe that the spiritual gifts found in the New Testament are still active in the church; hence, services are often spontaneous, being punctuated at times with acts of speaking in tongues, interpretation of tongues, prophetic messages, and the laying on of hands for the purposes of healing. Oneness believers, like all Pentecostals, are characterized by their practice of speaking in other tongues. In such ecstatic experiences a Oneness believer may vocalize fluent unintelligible utterances (glossolalia), or articulate a natural language previously unknown to them (xenoglossy).

Some Oneness Pentecostals practice foot washing, often in conjunction with their celebration of communion, as Jesus Christ did with his disciples at the Last Supper.

=== Holiness standards ===
Many Oneness Pentecostal groups emphasize holiness standards in dress, grooming, and conduct. This is a teaching similar to traditional Holiness Pentecostals but distinct from other Finished Work Pentecostals.

==== Historical development ====
The doctrine of outward holiness originated in Methodism. The early Methodists wore plain dress, with Methodist clergy condemning "high headdresses, ruffles, laces, gold, and 'costly apparel' in general". John Wesley, the founder of the Methodist movement, recommended that Methodists read his thoughts On Dress, in which he detailed acceptable types and colors of fabrics, in addition to "shapes and sizes of hats, coats, sleeves, and hairstyles". In that sermon, John Wesley expressed his desire for Methodists: "Let me see, before I die, a Methodist congregation, full as plain dressed as a Quaker congregation." He also taught, with respect to Christian headcovering, that women, "especially in a religious assembly", should "keep on her veil".

This Methodist doctrine continues to be taught (in varying degrees) in conservative Methodist denominations aligned with the holiness movement, such as the Fellowship of Independent Methodist Churches and the Allegheny Wesleyan Methodist Connection. The 1858 Wesleyan Methodist Book of Discipline stated,

We would not only enjoin on all who fear God plain dress, but we would recommend to our preachers and people, according to Mr. Wesley's views expressed in his sermon on the inefficiency of Christianity, published but a few years before his death, and containing his matured judgment, distinguishing plainness—Plainness which will publicly comment them to the maintenance of their Christian profession wherever they may be.

The teaching of Methodists aligned with that the holiness movement, where outward holiness is a testimony of a Christian believer's regeneration, done in obedience to God. This teaching was inherited by Holiness Pentecostalism at its inception, incorporating this Wesleyan theology alongside Holiness Pentecostal's insistence on a third work of grace.

Though the Finished Work Pentecostalism movement rejected the Wesleyan Methodist/Holiness Pentecostal doctrine of entire sanctification as an instantaneous, definite second work of grace, many early denominations maintained similar standards for their members. After World War II, however, these standards began to fade as they allowed for greater individual choice. Despite this, Oneness Pentecostals have continued to retain the original Holiness Pentecostal practice of holiness standards.

==== Teachings ====
Oneness Pentecostals believe that a Christian's lifestyle should be characterized by holiness, which they view as both a result of salvation and as essential for ongoing spiritual growth. According to their theology, holiness begins at baptism, when the blood of Christ is believed to wash away all sin, enabling the believer to stand before God as spiritually clean for the first time. From that point onward, a lifestyle of separation from worldly behaviors and values is considered essential.

They distinguish between inward, or moral, and outward, or practical, holiness. Moral holiness refers to righteous living, enabled by the indwelling of the Holy Spirit. Practical holiness involves adherence to specific behavioral standards, which often include guidelines for dress, entertainment, and personal conduct. Modesty in dress is emphasized as a biblical command as part of outward holiness, rooted in scriptures such as 1 Timothy 2:9 ("that women adorn themselves in modest apparel") and Philippians 4:5 ("Let your moderation be known unto all men"). In response to contemporary fashion trends, many Oneness Pentecostal organizations have established explicit dress codes. These often reflect standards of the early 20th century and include expectations such as women refraining from wearing pants, cutting their hair, or using makeup and jewelry; and men maintaining short hair, avoiding facial hair, and wearing long-sleeved shirts and full-length pants. Some churches also discourage or forbid watching secular television or movies.

Some critics from other Christian traditions view these expectations as legalistic. Oneness Pentecostals respond by asserting that holiness is not a means of earning salvation, but a consequence of it. They argue that obedience flows from a transformed nature, motivated by love for God rather than obligation. While they affirm Christian liberty, they contend that such liberty does not negate biblical commands for moral living, which they believe remain applicable today.

== Notable adherents ==
- David K. Bernard – minister, theologian, general superintendent of the United Pentecostal Church International, and founding president of Urshan University and Urshan Graduate School of Theology
- Irvin Baxter Jr. – minister, founder and president of Endtime Ministries, seen on various Christian television channels
- Kim Davis – clerk of Rowan County, Kentucky, who gained national media attention after defying a federal court order requiring that she issue same-sex marriage licenses following the U.S. Supreme Court decision in Obergefell v. Hodges
- Garfield Thomas Haywood – first presiding bishop of the Pentecostal Assemblies of the World (1925–1931); also the author of many tracts and composer of many gospel songs
- Pastor Gino Jennings – founder of the First Church of our Lord Jesus Christ, Inc
- Bishop Robert C. Lawson – protege of Bishop G. T. Haywood and founder of the Church of Our Lord Jesus Christ of the Apostolic Faith from 1919 to his death in 1961
- Bishop Sherrod C. Johnson – founder and chief apostle of the Church of the Lord Jesus Christ of the Apostolic Faith
- Hailemariam Desalegn – former Prime Minister of Ethiopia
- Tommy Tenney – a minister and best-selling author
- Bishop Jesse Delano Ellis II – first presiding prelate of the United Pentecostal Churches of Christ and Pentecostal Churches of Christ; founder of the Joint College of Bishops
- Henry Van Thio – former Vice President of Myanmar

== See also ==
- Nontrinitarianism
- List of Oneness Pentecostal denominations
