= United Pentecostal Church International =

Christian Pentecostal denomination

- Abbreviation: UPCI
- Classification: Protestant
- Orientation: Pentecostal
- Theology: Oneness Pentecostal
- Polity: Congregational; Presbyterian
- General Superintendent: David K. Bernard
- Headquarters: Weldon Spring, Missouri
- Origin: 1945; 81 years ago St. Louis
- Merger of: Pentecostal Church, Inc. and Pentecostal Assemblies of Jesus Christ
- Separations: Worldwide Pentecostal Fellowship
- Congregations: 45,562 (2025)
- Members: 6,185,075 (2025)
- Ministers: 45,880 (2025)
- Missionaries: 1,246 (incl. missionary workers)
- Seminaries: 1 (Urshan Graduate School of Theology)
- Publications: Pentecostal Life
- Official website: upci.org
- Slogan: “The Whole Gospel to the Whole World by the Whole Church.”

The United Pentecostal Church International (UPCI) is a Oneness Pentecostal denomination headquartered in Weldon Spring, Missouri. The United Pentecostal Church International was formed in 1945 by a merger of the former Pentecostal Church, Inc. and the Pentecostal Assemblies of Jesus Christ. The organization was known as the United Pentecostal Church from its founding until 1972, when "International" was added to its name.

The United Pentecostal Church International began with 521 churches and has grown to more than 45,000 churches, including daughter works and preaching points, 45,000 ministers, and a total constituency of over 6.1 million worldwide, making it the largest Oneness denomination. The international fellowship of United Pentecostals consists of national organizations that are united as the Global Council of the UPCI, which is chaired by the general superintendent of the UPCI, currently David K. Bernard.

== History ==
The United Pentecostal Church International emerged from Pentecostalism, which traces its origins to the teachings of Charles Parham in Topeka, Kansas, and the Azusa Street Revival led by William J. Seymour in 1906. The UPCI traces its organizational roots to 1916, when a large group of Pentecostal ministers within the Assemblies of God USA began to unite around Modalistic Monarchianism, the oneness of God, and baptism in the name of Jesus. Several Oneness ministers met in Eureka Springs, Arkansas, and on January 2, 1917, formed a Oneness Pentecostal organization called the General Assembly of the Apostolic Assemblies.

The General Assembly of the Apostolic Assemblies merged with another group—the Pentecostal Assemblies of the World (PAW)—and accepted the leadership of Garfield Thomas Haywood, an African American. The group held its first meeting in Eureka Springs in 1918. This interracial organization adopted the PAW name and remained the only Oneness Pentecostal body until late 1924. Southern Jim Crow laws and racist hatred resulted in many white leaders withdrawing from the PAW rather than remaining under African American leadership. Many local congregations in the Southern United States, however, remained integrated while attempting to comply with local segregation laws.

In 1925, three new Oneness denominations were formed: the Apostolic Churches of Jesus Christ, the Pentecostal Ministerial Alliance, and Emmanuel's Church in Jesus Christ. In 1927, steps were taken toward reunifying these organizations. Meeting in a joint convention in Guthrie, Oklahoma, Emmanuel's Church in Jesus Christ and the Apostolic Churches of Jesus Christ merged, taking the name the Apostolic Church of Jesus Christ. This merger united about 400 Oneness Pentecostal ministers. In 1931, a unity conference with representatives from four Oneness organizations met in Columbus, Ohio, attempting to bring all Oneness Pentecostals together. The Pentecostal Ministerial Alliance voted to merge with the Apostolic Church of Jesus Christ, but that body rejected the terms of the proposed merger. Nevertheless, a union between the Apostolic Church of Jesus Christ and the PAW was consummated in November 1931. The new body retained the name of the Pentecostal Assemblies of the World.

In 1932, the Pentecostal Ministerial Alliance changed its name to the Pentecostal Church, Incorporated, to reflect its organizational structure. In 1936, the Pentecostal Church, Incorporated, ministers voted to pursue an amalgamation with the Pentecostal Assemblies of Jesus Christ. Final union, however, proved elusive until September 25, 1945, when these two Oneness Pentecostal organizations voted in St. Louis to merge and form the United Pentecostal Church International. The merger of these two Oneness Pentecostal bodies brought together 521 churches.

In the U.S. and Canada, the newly formed United Pentecostal Church International traditionally reflected the surrounding demographics, with the majority of its constituency being White and Anglo-American. In the last quarter of the twentieth century, however, the United Pentecostal Church International attempted to shift its doctrines to include people of every race and culture in North America. In 2008, the United Pentecostal Church International published a statement against racism, stating that it affirms the worth and dignity of every human being, regardless of race or ethnicity, and consequently opposes bigotry and hatred.

== Beliefs ==
=== Essential doctrines ===
The UPCI's core theology is consistent with that of other Oneness Pentecostals, rejecting the Trinity and instead believing that the Father, Son, and Holy Spirit are different manifestations of God, as opposed to separate persons. The UPCI believes that one must repent, be baptized "in the name of Jesus" (as opposed to "in the name of the Father, Son, and Holy Spirit"), and receive the Holy Ghost with the initial evidence of speaking in tongues to be saved, as outlined in Acts 2:38.

=== Sexuality ===
Ministers at all levels of the UPCI are allowed to marry and have children. The UPCI considers any form of homosexuality, bisexuality, transgenderism, (Note: The UPCI defines "transgenderism" to mean “appearing as, wishing to be considered as, or having undergone surgery to become a member of the opposite sex.”) fornication, adultery, polygamy, bestiality, and incest to be contrary to biblical teaching and states that God's plan is "heterosexuality, with definite boundaries between sexes in both appearance and behavior." The UPCI has stated, however, that it does not preach condemnation, but rather reconciliation, and implores everyone to be reconciled to God.

=== Abortion ===
The UPCI opposes legalized abortion, as well as any legislation that would "bring about a climate designed to undermine the sanctity of human life." It has also designated the third Sunday in January of each year as "Sanctity of Life Sunday."

=== Technology ===
Scripture elegantly solves the proper management of media technology with a single verse: “I will set no wicked thing before mine eye…”

— United Pentecostal Church International, Media Technology

The UPCI states in its Articles of Faith that it disapproves of members owning televisions.

In 1998, the UPCI published a position paper on computer and internet usage that suggested the following guidelines in the home:

- Placing computers in an area used by the whole family
- Placing programs on computers that block vulgar or sexually explicit material
- Sharing passwords
- Regularly evaluating website history
- Exercising restraint in the usage of such devices

In a 2013 position paper, the UPCI further clarified its stance on all forms of media technology outside of television, including computers, tablets, smartphones, and gaming consoles. It stated that because "sinful media programming" is available through such mediums, the UPCI calls for responsible use that is solely in accordance with "wholesome Christian principles."

=== Other issues ===
The UPCI lays out its position on other matters in its ministerial manual, including the following issues.

==== Gambling ====
The UPCI is opposed to gambling, defined as “to bet on an uncertain outcome, to stake something on a contingency, playing the game of chance for stakes.” This opposition is due to the fact that it considers gambling addictive, inconsistent with scriptural work ethic, ignoring stewardship, and involving monetary gain to the hurt and suffering of the less fortunate.

==== Organized sports ====
The UPCI recommends that members refrain from participating in organized sports―excluding recreational activities within the local church―because it has an "attitude and appearance that opposes Pentecostal principles, teachings, and standards."

==== Transcendental Meditation ====
The UPCI is strongly opposed to Transcendental Meditation and its "further funding, promotion, or teaching... in classrooms."

==== Bible translations ====
In response to the publication of the Revised Standard Version in 1952, the UPCI's General Conference adopted a statement in 1953 disapproving the use of the translation. Further, the statement provided the King James Version as "the most accurate translation of the Scriptures to be used in our churches and among our people."

In 2022, the UPCI further clarified its stance on Bible translations with a position paper. The statement continued to recognize the King James Version of the Bible as a "trusted and prominent translation of the Scriptures," and further recommended only translations (in English or other languages) that meet the following guidelines:

- Developed by a committee of scholars who hold a high view of inspiration―considering Scripture both inspired and infallible
- Relatively literal in translation

== Organization ==
The basic governmental structure of the UPCI is congregational at the local church level and presbyterian at higher organizational levels. Local churches are self-governing, electing their own pastors and other leaders, owning their own property, deciding their own budgets, establishing their membership, and conducting all necessary local business. The central organization embraces a modified presbyterian system: ministers meet in sectional, district, and general conferences to elect officers and to conduct the church's affairs. The annual General Conference is the highest authority in the UPCI, with the power to determine articles of faith, elect officers, and determine policy. A General Superintendent is elected to preside over the church as a whole. On October 1, 2009, David K. Bernard was announced as the current General Superintendent.

=== Statistics ===
The UPCI grew from 521 member churches in 1945 to 5,132 churches (including 487 daughter works and 333 preaching points), 12,315 ministers, and a total constituency of 1,102,000 in the United States and Canada in 2025. The UPCI has also experienced substantial growth over the last 10 years in the United States and Canada, adding 588 churches and 2,413 ministers between 2014 and 2024, reaching one million members for the first time in 2024. Outside the U.S. and Canada, the UPCI has 40,430 churches and preaching points, 33,565 ministers, and a constituency of 5,083,075 in 201 nations and territories. The international fellowship consists of national organizations that are united as the Global Council of the UPCI, which is chaired by the general superintendent of the UPCI, David K. Bernard. Total worldwide membership, including North America, is at 6.18 million.

=== General Conference ===
The General Conference of the United Pentecostal Church International is an annual conference occurring yearly since 1945. It is the highest governing body of the UPCI. Attendees of the conference conduct business, receive training, network with colleagues, participate in worship sessions, and raise funds for various ministries.

=== North American Youth Congress ===
North American Youth Congress (NAYC) is a church gathering primarily for the youth of the UPCI, held biennially since 1979 in various locations around North America. NAYC is the largest event hosted by the United Pentecostal Church International and has been described as one of the largest, if not the largest, gathering of Christian youth in the US. The largest NAYC to date was in 2019, when NAYC was held at The Dome at America's Center in St. Louis, Missouri from July 31 to August 2. The event was attended by over 36,000 youths.

== Educational institutions ==
The UPCI owns and operates one accredited seminary, Urshan Graduate School of Theology in Wentzville, Missouri. It was accredited by the Association of Theological Schools in 2010, and also by the Higher Learning Commission on June 25, 2020. The UPCI also operates one Christian liberal arts college accredited by the Higher Learning Commission, Urshan University (formerly Urshan College and Gateway College of Evangelism) in Wentzville, Missouri. The college was established in October 2011, when the UPCI General Board approved a plan for Urshan Graduate School of Theology to acquire Gateway College (a college formerly run by the UPCI's Missouri District) to establish Urshan University as a new Christian liberal arts college. The transition was completed on July 1, 2012.

In addition, the UPCI endorses several other Christian and Bible colleges. The only endorsed accredited institution not owned by the UPCI is Christian Life College in Stockton, California, which has been accredited by the Western Association of Schools and Colleges (WASC) since 2019. Other unaccredited bible colleges endorsed by the UPCI are:

- Apostolic Bible Institute in St. Paul, Minnesota
- Centro Teológico Ministerial in Pasadena, Texas
- Indiana Bible College in Indianapolis, Indiana
- Northeast Christian College in Fredericton, New Brunswick, Canada
- North Texas Christian College in Euless, Texas
- Texas Bible College in Lufkin, Texas

Currently, there are only three accredited colleges and seminaries endorsed by the UPCI:

- Christian Life College in Stockton, California
- Urshan University in Wentzville, Missouri
- Urshan Graduate School of Theology in Wentzville, Missouri

=== Global Association of Theological Studies ===
The Global Association of Theological Studies (or GATS) is the higher education arm of UPCI Global Missions, overseeing the development and implementation of Oneness Pentecostal curriculum for its member schools. The GATS has 526 bible schools in 120 countries worldwide, representing about 11,000 students and 3,000 graduates annually. In 2019, its member schools graduated 3,375 students.
