= Assemblies of God USA =

Pentecostal Christian denomination

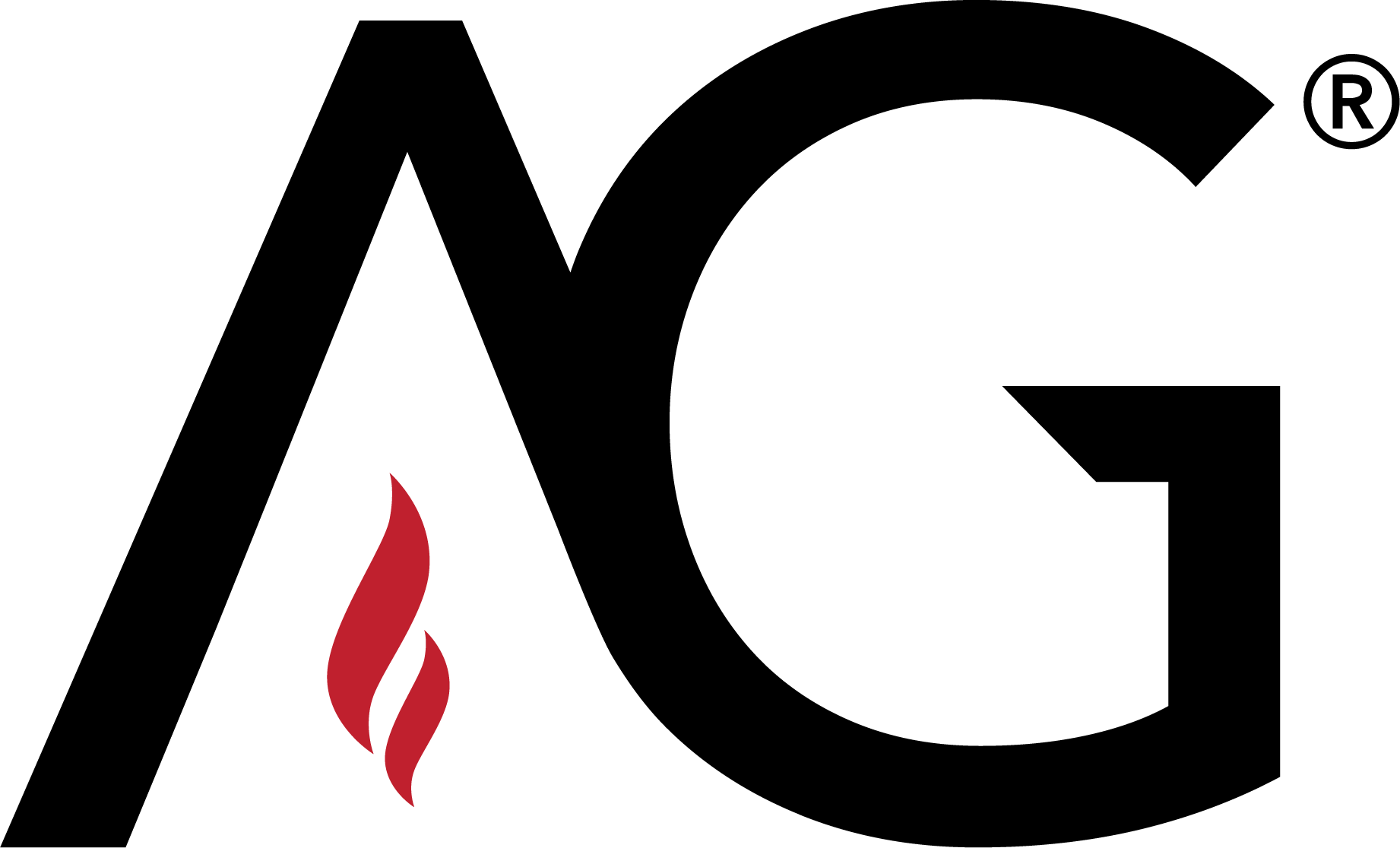
- Classification: Protestant
- Orientation: Evangelical
- Theology: Pentecostal
- Polity: Mixed Presbyterian and Congregational polity
- Governance: General Council of the Assemblies of God
- General Superintendent: Doug Clay
- Associations: National Association of Evangelicals; Pentecostal/Charismatic Churches of North America; Pentecostal World Fellowship; Wesleyan Holiness Consortium; World Assemblies of God Fellowship
- Region: United States
- Headquarters: Springfield, Missouri
- Origin: 1914; 112 years ago Hot Springs, Arkansas
- Merger of: Apostolic Faith Movement; Church of God in Christ (White Ministers) Christian and Missionary Alliance (Midwest and Northeast congregations)
- Absorbed: Holiness Baptist Association (1917) (Southwestern Arkansas congregations); Community Church of Joy (ELCA) (2016); Southside General Baptist Church (2020)
- Separations: General Assembly of the Apostolic Assemblies (1916); International Church of the Foursquare Gospel (1923)
- Congregations: 12,681 (2023)
- Members: 3,060,000 adherents (2024) 1,800,000 members (2024)
- Ministers: 38,182 (2024)
- Aid organization: Convoy of Hope
- Official website: ag.org
- *persons of all ages who identify with an AG church

The General Council of the Assemblies of God, operating as the Assemblies of God USA (AG), is a Pentecostal Christian denomination in the United States and the U.S. branch of the World Assemblies of God Fellowship, the world's largest Pentecostal body.

The AG reported 2.98 million adherents and 1.74 million members in 2023. In 2024, the AG reported 3.06 million adherents and 1.8 million members. In 2011, it was the ninth largest Christian denomination and the second largest Pentecostal denomination in the United States. It was the fourth largest Protestant denomination in 2025 according to Pew Research. In 2024, Pew Research Center estimated that 1.1% of US adults, or about 2.9 million people, self-identifies with the Assemblies of God USA. The Assemblies of God is a Finished Work denomination, and it holds to a conservative, evangelical and classical Arminian theology as expressed in the Statement of Fundamental Truths and position papers, which emphasize such core Pentecostal doctrines as the baptism in the Holy Spirit, speaking in tongues, divine healing and the Second Coming of Jesus Christ.

The fellowship's polity is a hybrid of presbyterian and congregational models. This tension between local independence and national authority is seen in the AG's historical reluctance to refer to itself as a denomination, preferring the terms fellowship and movement. The national headquarters are in Springfield, Missouri, where the administrative and executive offices and Gospel Publishing House are located. Convoy of Hope serves as the AG's aid organization. The AG's college ministry is Chi Alpha. The Assemblies of God maintains relationships with other Pentecostal groups at both regional and national levels through the Pentecostal/Charismatic Churches of North America and the Pentecostal World Fellowship. It is also a member of the Wesleyan Holiness Consortium and the National Association of Evangelicals.

The denomination was founded in 1914 during a meeting of Pentecostal ministers at Hot Springs, Arkansas. These ministers came from several different Pentecostal movements. Some were loosely affiliated with the Church of God in Christ, Apostolic Faith, or other early Pentecostal groups. In 1916, the General Council condemned Oneness Pentecostalism, causing a split within the young denomination and the adoption of the Statement of Fundamental Truths, which endorses the Trinity. Established during the Jim Crow era, the AG forbade the ordination of black ministers from 1939 until 1962, although the AG explicitly included Hispanic Americans from 1918 onwards. African Americans could still be issued local licenses to preach. Black Pentecostals seeking ordination were referred to the Church of God in Christ. Women were allowed to become pastors in 1935, but prior to that women had served as evangelists, preachers, and missionaries.

The denomination identified itself with the broader American evangelical movement in the 1940s. The charismatic movement of the 1960s and 1970s influenced the AG as well. Standards on behavior and dress became more relaxed over time, and the denomination dropped pacifism as an official teaching. In the 1990s and 2000s, AG churches have experienced revivals that have drawn comparisons to early Pentecostalism, the most famous being the Brownsville Revival. Chi Alpha, the AG's college ministry, has been involved in multiple controversies over sexual abuse since 2022.

== History ==
=== Background ===
==== Charles Parham ====
Charles Parham was a leading figure in the early development of the Assemblies of God. Parham was a member of the Methodist Episcopal Church and served as an unordained supply pastor in Eudora, Kansas, from 1893 to 1895. Parham believed in the Methodist doctrine of entire sanctification as a second work of grace. He was also an adherent of the holiness movement and believed that faith healing was provided for in Christ's atonement. Parham had some contact with the Fire-Baptized Holiness Church led by Benjamin H. Irwin. He accepted Irwin's teaching of a third experience of grace identified with the "baptism with the Holy Ghost and fire".

After 1895, Parham left the Methodist Church and became a nondenominational evangelist. As a restorationist, he rejected traditional denominations as incompatible with true, biblical Christianity, which he referred to as the "apostolic faith". By 1900, he concluded based on his study of the Bible that glossolalia (speaking in tongues) was the evidence of receiving baptism with the Holy Spirit. While other people had claimed to speak in tongues before Parham, he was the first to connect glossolalia with Spirit baptism. His Apostolic Faith Movement was strongest in southwest Missouri and southeast Kansas. He established several congregations around Galena, Kansas.

In 1905, Parham moved his headquarters to Houston, Texas, and opened a Bible training school. One of his students was William J. Seymour, an African American holiness preacher; Seymour studied outside of Parham's classrooms due to the Jim Crow laws. In 1906, Seymour moved to Los Angeles, California, where his preaching ignited the interracial Azusa Street Revival. Seymour initially considered himself under Parham's authority, but Parham's criticism of the revival led to a permanent split between the two men. Seymour was also only permitted by Parham to preach to blacks. The Azusa Street Revival soon eclipsed Parham’s influence over the nascent Pentecostal movement.

In 1906, Parham's movement had an estimated 8,600 members concentrated in Kansas, Missouri, Arkansas, and Texas. In that year, he appointed Warren Fay Carothers as general field director for the United States. Howard A. Goss was appointed field director for Texas to supervise around 60 full-time evangelists. Around this time, L. C. Hall and D. C. O. Opperman joined the movement. Both men were prominent former members of John Alexander Dowie's Christian Catholic Apostolic Church. Parham attempted to gain control of Zion, Illinois, the utopian community established by Dowie. As a result, a number of Dowie's followers accepted the Pentecostal message.

In 1907, Parham was charged with sodomy while in San Antonio, Texas. The scandal led evangelists to renounce his authority, and his organization dissolved.

==== Apostolic Faith Movement reorganized ====
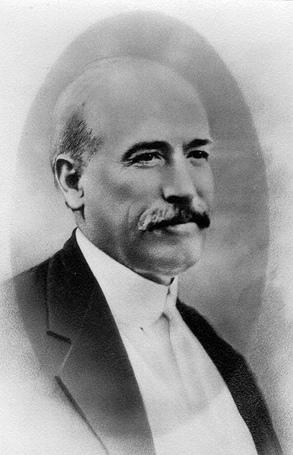
E.N. Bell, first General Superintendent of the AG

Parham's former associates reorganized the Apostolic Faith Movement. Prominent leaders of the new movement were Howard A. Goss, L. C. Hall, D. C. O. Opperman, and A. G. Canada. They were later joined by Eudorus N. Bell, previously a Southern Baptist minister. They began to identify themselves as Pentecostals. The Apostolic Faith Movement played a leading role in organizing and institutionalizing Pentecostalism in the Midwest and Southwest and from 1909 to 1912 absorbed smaller Pentecostal groups. The Apostolic Faith Movement was a mostly-white organization, but it had some black and Hispanic ministers and missionaries.

The Church of God in Christ (COGIC) was a predominantly African-American Holiness church headquartered in Memphis, Tennessee. In 1907, its founder, Charles Harrison Mason, visited Azusa Street and adopted the Pentecostal message. Mason's group was the first Pentecostal denomination to incorporate, which gave its clergy privileges such as railroad discounts. As COGIC grew, it became interracial with many white members, and many white Pentecostal ministers sought ordination from Mason.

Early Pentecostal groups were loosely organized. Historian Cecil M. Robeck, Jr. notes, "While a person might hold primary allegiance to one organization, she or he could hold credentials with a second organization as well." In 1907, Goss had received a license to preach from Mason's group, and he claimed that Mason had given him permission to issue ministerial credentials under the Churches of God in Christ name for the "white work". In 1910, the Apostolic Faith Movement was renamed “Church of God in Christ and in Unity with the Apostolic Faith.” This change was part of a movement within Pentecostalism at that time to adopt church names that appeared in the Bible, such as Church of God, Church of God in Christ, and Assembly of God.

In the Church of God in Christ, white ministers were supervised by the African-American leaders of the denomination; though in some instances, the relations between Mason's church and white ministers were more informal. (Note: Robeck (2005, II.A.) writes: "On paper, at least, there were over 350 such ministers which made it appear that these white ministers composed roughly half of all Church of God in Christ leadership. What now seems quite apparent is that while these white ministers received ordination from the Church of God in Christ, they continued to function along segregated lines. For them, it was a marriage of convenience, not an integrated fellowship. Howard Goss who negotiated with Mason for the ability to sign these credentials would later label it 'an association...mainly for purposes of business.' But was it only a business proposition for Mason?") Beginning in 1911, many white ministers affiliated with COGIC expressed dissatisfaction with being under African American leadership. In 1913, 353 white ministers formed a new church, which gave its own credentials, although still using the same name as Mason's organization.

==== Chicago revival ====
By 1910, the center of the Pentecostal movement had moved from Los Angeles to Chicago, Illinois. According to historian Vinson Synan, "for the next decade, Chicago served as the de facto worldwide missions and theological center for the fast-growing movement".

The two most important Pentecostal congregations were the Stone Church and the North Avenue Mission. Both churches had contacts with the Apostolic Faith Movement. The Stone Church was established in 1906 by William Hamner Piper, a former follower of Dowie who had joined the Pentecostal movement. Due to its strategic location in Chicago, the church often hosted large conventions and rallies.

The North Avenue Mission was pastored by William Howard Durham, who received Spirit baptism at Azusa Street in 1907. Unlike other early Pentecostal leaders, Durham did not believe in entire sanctification as a second work of grace. He believed in the finished work doctrine, teaching that "when God saves a man, He makes him clean". Durham had a direct influence on many of the founders of Pentecostal movements around the world. A. H. Argue of Winnipeg, Canada, received Spirit baptism under Durham's ministry. Argue returned to Canada, and his preaching led to the founding of the Pentecostal Assemblies of Canada, the Assemblies of God's sister denomination.

==== Christian and Missionary Alliance ====
The Stone Church and the North Avenue Mission were the "main exporters" of Pentecostalism to Christian and Missionary Alliance (CMA) churches of the Midwest and Northeast. The CMA was a higher life denomination founded by A. B. Simpson.

Simpson and other Alliance leaders were cautiously receptive to the new movement. In the spring of 1907, the Alliance's annual council was convinced "that God [was] now visiting His people in many places with a special manifestation of power". Throughout the summer of 1907, aspects of the Pentecostal revival were on display at CMA events. At the Beulah Park Convention in Collinwood, Ohio, it was reported that "God poured out His Spirit upon the people in general and upon others in particular, so that they spoke with new tongues and magnified God. The sick were healed and demons were expelled".

While Simpson was not opposed to speaking in tongues, he opposed the doctrine of evidentiary tongues. In 1914, the Alliance adopted an official position stating, "the consecrated believer may receive the Spirit in His fulness without speaking in tongues or any miraculous manifestation whatever." Afterwards, CMA members who believed strongly in evidentiary tongues left the Alliance. After Simpson's death, the Alliance became more hostile to tongue-speaking. A. W. Tozer coined the phrase "seek not, forbid not" that summarized the CMA stance on speaking in tongues.

The CMA had a profound influence on the Assemblies of God. According to historian Joe Creech, the Assemblies of God derived its "hymnody, healing doctrine, ecclesiology, and organizational structures" from the CMA. While the Apostolic Faith Movement drew its adherents from the rural Southwest, the CMA and Chicago Pentecostals were primarily Northern middle-class evangelicals. Many of the AG's future leaders had CMA backgrounds.

=== Early history (1914–1929) ===
==== General Council of 1914 ====
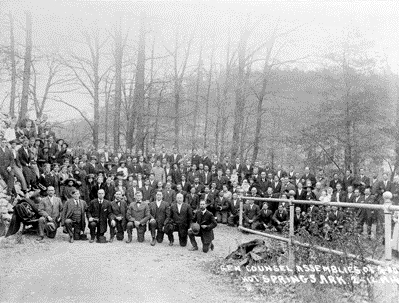
The First General Council. Executive presbytery are kneeling in the front row (l–r): J. W. Welch, M. M. Pinson, T. K. Leonard, J. Roswell Flower, Cyrus Fockler, Howard A. Goss, E. N. Bell, and Daniel C. O. Opperman.

In 1914, Apostolic Faith Movement leaders Bell, Goss, Opperman, M. M. Pinson, and A. P. Collins issued the call for a general council to "Churches of God in Christ, and to all Pentecostal or Apostolic Faith Assemblies". What resulted was a merger of the Apostolic Faith Movement, Chicago Pentecostals, and CMA Pentecostals at Hot Springs, Arkansas. The 1st General Council was attended by predominantly white representatives from 20 states and missions in Egypt and South Africa. The fellowship that emerged was incorporated as the General Council of the Assemblies of God. Bell was elected the first general superintendent. The Assemblies of God gave five reasons for calling the meeting:

1. Create unity in doctrine and in identifying Pentecostal congregations.
2. Develop ways to conserve the work at home and abroad.
3. Develop a workable system for the support of missionaries.
4. Charter local churches under "one Bible name".
5. Discuss the possibility of a Bible training school.

Other actions taken at the 1st General Council addressed women in ministry. The Pentecostals who founded the Assemblies of God had no objections to women being engaged in ministry. The Pentecostal belief in personal experience, Spirit baptism as empowerment for service, and the need for evangelists and missionaries encouraged women to be active in all types of ministry. What concerned some Pentecostal leaders, such as Bell, were women exercising independent authority over men. The council therefore approved of the granting of credentials to female evangelists and missionaries while restricting the office of pastor to men, and it was not until 1920 that female evangelists could vote at denominational meetings. By the fall of 1914, out of 512 credential holders, 142 were female missionaries and evangelists.

After 1914, the Church of God in Christ became predominantly Black or African-American and the Assemblies of God would remain predominantly white. However, there were African Americans involved in the early years of the Assemblies of God. The African American pastor Garfield Thomas Haywood, for example, pastored one of the largest churches and was an influential voice within the fellowship until he withdrew from the newly-founded denomination after 1916.

==== "New Issue" and doctrinal clarity ====
The founders of the fellowship did not intend to create a denomination and originally had no creed or doctrinal statement. However, in response to several doctrinal issues, the most important being the Oneness teaching, the AG felt the need for agreement on central doctrines and to reassure evangelical Christians of its adherence to orthodox belief. Oneness Pentecostalism rejected Trinitarian theology, instead identifying the Jehovah of the Old Testament with the Christ of the New. Furthermore, Oneness adherents believed that Christians, regardless of a previous baptism, should be baptized in the name of Jesus, rather than in the name of the Trinity. By 1915, it was adhered to by many in the fellowship, including founders such as Goss, Opperman, Hall, and Henry G. Rodgers. Other influential leaders, such as G. T. Haywood, adopted the Oneness doctrine as well.

In 1916, the 4th General Council met in St. Louis to resolve the "new issue". In a move that caused not a little anxiety, a committee introduced the Statement of Fundamental Truths. Oneness proponents and others saw this as an attack on the authority of the Bible, yet it was adopted along with a recommendation that AG ministers use the Trinitarian baptismal formula. Old preaching credentials were recalled and new ones issued with the Fundamental Truths included. Oneness believers, including a third of the fellowship's ministers, were forced to withdraw, a loss especially felt in the South where the Oneness doctrine had the most influence. A side effect of this was a transition in leadership from former Apostolic Faith leaders, many of whom accepted the Oneness teaching, to men with Christian and Missionary Alliance backgrounds. The Oneness dissenters formed the General Assembly of the Apostolic Churches, which later merged with another group to form the Pentecostal Assemblies of the World.

Among the Fundamental Truths was a statement regarding speaking in tongues as the initial physical evidence of Spirit baptism. Its inclusion was challenged by F.F. Bosworth, an executive presbyter, who argued that while for many speaking in tongues was an evidence of the baptism it was not the only evidence. The issue was decided at the General Council of September 1918 where Bosworth, who two months earlier had resigned so as not to damage the fellowship, was present and invited to address the council. Following debate two resolutions were passed which assured that initial evidence would remain an official teaching of the fellowship.

While doctrinal controversy led to the withdrawal of ministers, the fellowship experienced growth in subsequent years. District councils were organized in various regions of the country and, where these did not exist, home missionary fields were designated to maximize evangelistic efforts. In 1917, W. Jethro Walthall led his Holiness Baptist Association of southwestern Arkansas into the Assemblies of God. District councils and missionary stations were established outside the U.S. also. By 1921, there were districts in Canada (see Pentecostal Assemblies of Canada), China, Japan (see Japan Assemblies of God), India (see Assemblies of God in India), and Egypt. Central Bible College was started in the basement of the Central Assembly of God church in Springfield, Missouri, in 1922. In 1929, the fellowship claimed 91,981 members in 1,612 churches.

=== 1930–1979 ===
==== Women and ethnic minorities ====
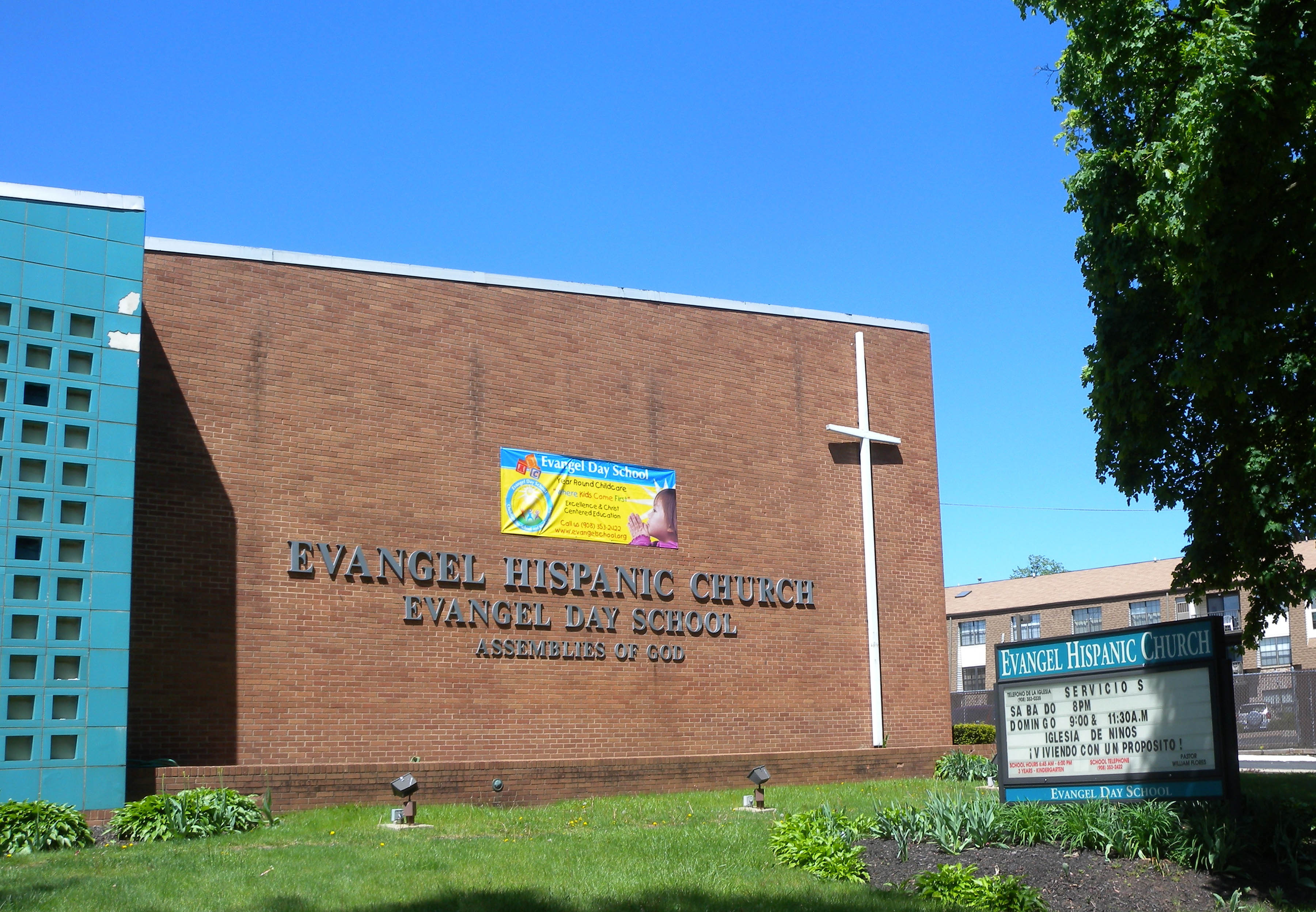
Day school of Evangel Hispanic Church, an AG church in Elizabeth, New Jersey

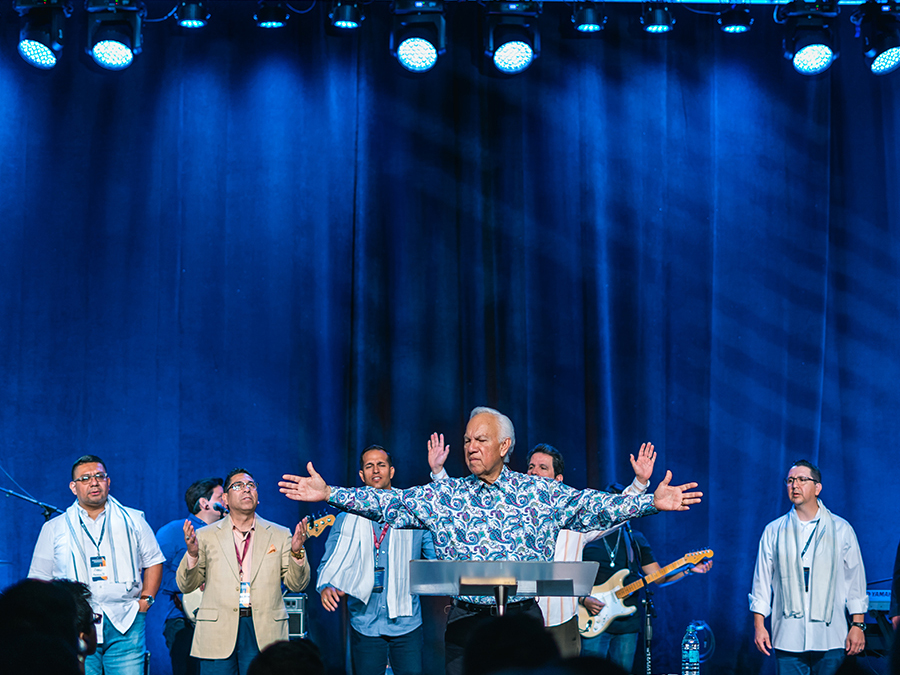
AG Hispanic Centennial Celebration, August 2, 2018, in Houston, Texas

Despite Pentecostalism's origins in a racially inclusive revival, it accommodated itself to America's culture of racial segregation rather early; the Assemblies of God was no different. As early as 1915, an executive presbyter wrote in an article for the Pentecostal Evangel that segregation was "ordained of God"; however, it was not until 1939 that the General Presbytery enacted a policy prohibiting the ordination of African Americans to the ministry. Districts were still allowed to license African Americans to preach but only in the district where the license was issued. Black Pentecostals seeking ordination were referred to "one of the colored organizations". This was especially true of the Church of God in Christ, which, despite the fact that it predates the Assemblies of God, was seen as a "younger sibling". It was not until 1962, under the leadership of General Superintendent Thomas F. Zimmerman, that the denomination finally began issuing ordinations without regard to race. Three years later the 1965 General Council adopted a resolution affirming the goals of the civil rights movement and condemning racism and discrimination. By the 1970s, there was renewed focus on inner-city evangelism and integrated urban efforts.

While blacks were largely excluded from the AG until the 1960s, though some served as missionaries and evangelists, the denomination's work among Spanish-speaking people has a long history, first sanctioned explicitly in 1918. Hispanic outreach became independent of the Foreign Missions Department in 1929 when the first Latin American District was established. By the end of World War II, the AG's Latin American constituency formed the largest Protestant presence among Hispanics in the United States. The AG also focused on major European immigrant populations, but as later generations assimilated into American culture, these separate European segments were absorbed into the regular geographic districts.

During the time when African Americans were barred from ordination, women began to receive greater opportunities for leadership. Women formed an important part of the Assemblies of God's constituency, many being Sunday School workers and evangelists, most prominent being Aimee Semple McPherson (who would later found the Foursquare Church). This made the issue of women's place in the movement important in the 1930s. It was also recognized that many congregations who could not afford male pastors relied on women preachers. Although opposition to female pastors had been regularly affirmed since 1914, the office of pastor was opened to women in 1935.

==== Relations with other denominations and renewal movements ====
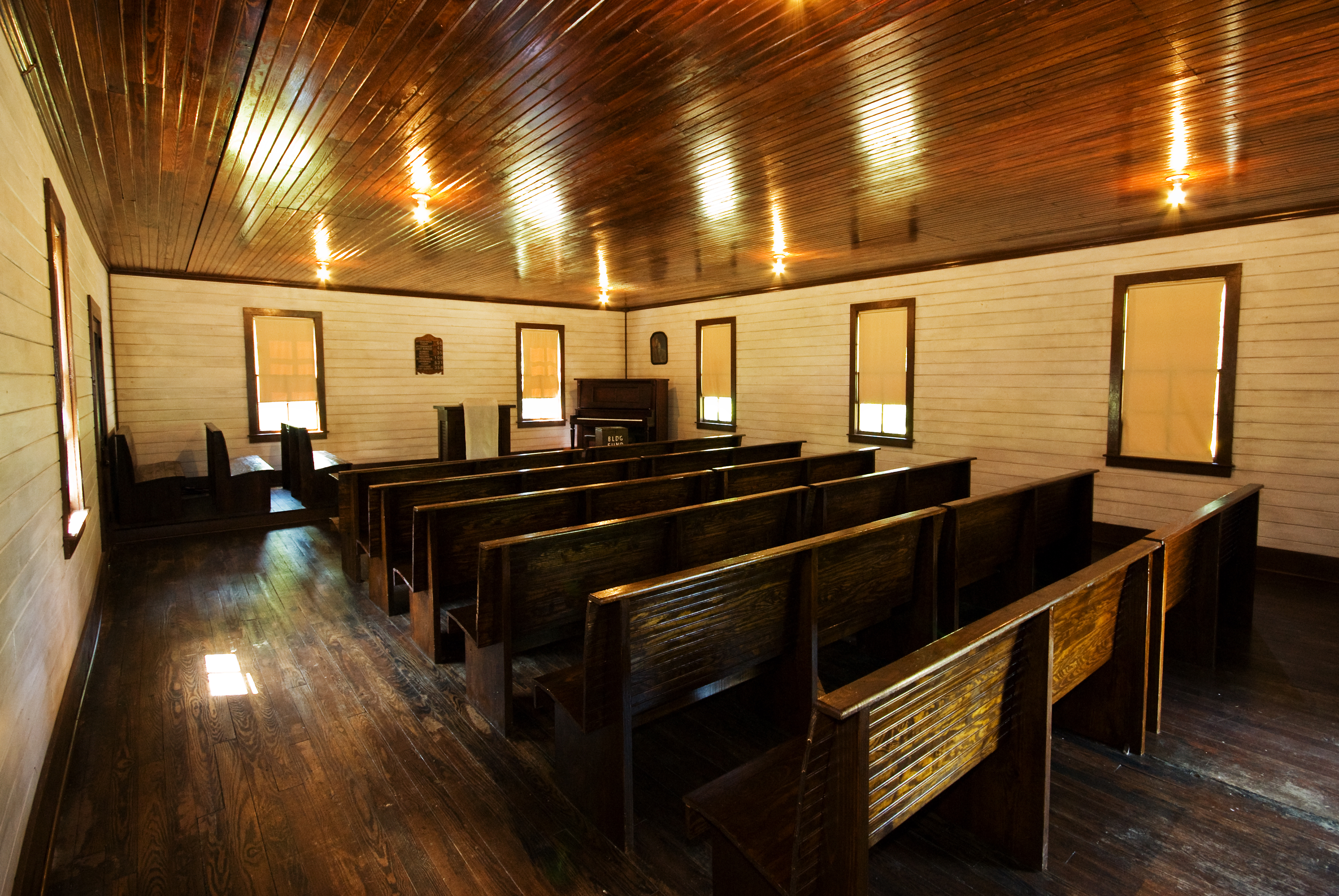
The interior of the AG church in Tupelo, Mississippi, that Elvis Presley attended as a child.

Between the World Wars, the movement kept a relative isolation from other Pentecostal and evangelical groups, but after World War II, the AG started an approximation with Pentecostal groups overseas. Like the Federation of Pentecostal Churches in Germany and the Assemblies of God in Australia, at that time many national denominations came to affiliate with the U.S. fellowship. These partnerships would later develop into the World Assemblies of God Fellowship. As well as establishing fellowships in other nations, the AG also began to communicate with other U.S. churches. The Assemblies of God was a founding member of both the National Association of Evangelicals and the Pentecostal Fellowship of North America (now Pentecostal/Charismatic Churches of North America).

In the 1950s, the AG was challenged by the Latter Rain movement, which began among former members of the Pentecostal Assemblies of Canada, the AG's Canadian counterpart, and quickly spread to the United States. The "New Order" as it was known was highly critical of denominations, such as the AG, and taught that the gifts of the Spirit are channeled through church elders and are given to others by the laying on of hands. However, the Assemblies of God and other classical Pentecostal groups maintained that the charismata are not personally received or imparted but are manifested as the Holy Spirit wills. In 1949 with a meeting of the General Council approaching, there were fears that the fellowship might split over the Latter Rain issue, but in the end, the General Council was united against what were seen as the excesses of the movement. A General Council resolution specified six errors which included: imparting, identifying, bestowing, or confirming gifts by prophecy and the laying on of hands. It also rejected the idea that the Church is built on present-day apostles and prophets. The Latter Rain theology of no pre-tribulation rapture and the manifested sons of God teaching were condemned as heresy. The Latter Rain and the Salvation/Healing Revival of the late 1940s and 50s would be a major influence on later renewal movements. During this time, by 1953, the denomination's college ministry Chi Alpha was chartered.

The affiliation of the Assemblies of God with the National Association of Evangelicals in 1942 signaled the AG's alignment with evangelicalism and its opposition to mainline Protestantism and the ecumenical movement. The AG and its evangelical partners agreed on most issues and shared similar world views though the AG's Pentecostal distinctives—Spirit baptism and the operation of spiritual gifts—were not embraced by most evangelical Christians. The AG's response then to the charismatic movement that began in the 1960s was a cautious one, affirming the move of the Holy Spirit yet urging that all revival must be judged by scripture. For the first time, beliefs and practices which had largely remained confined to the classical Pentecostal denominations began to impact mainline Protestant and Roman Catholic churches on a large scale (see: Catholic Charismatic Renewal). The fact that this occurred in these churches (which were historically seen by Pentecostals as suspect), the multifaceted nature of the movement owing to the many different traditions its participants came from, and the perception by Pentecostals that the movement was based too much on experience and not on biblical teaching led some in the Assemblies of God to see it in relation to the ecumenical movement.

The charismatic movement forced a reevaluation of what it was to be Pentecostal. The Assemblies of God understood Spirit baptism in the context of baptistic evangelical theology and, by the 1950s, emphasized certain doctrines and practices as requisite for Spirit baptism. Charismatics challenged these views by claiming to receive Holy Spirit baptism outside of this context (such as remaining in liturgical churches, failing to reject sacramental theologies, and not adopting Pentecostal taboos on dancing, drinking, smoking, etc.). On the local level, Assemblies of God churches were influenced by the charismatic movement. Some charismatics left their original churches and joined less formal Assemblies of God congregations. In addition, the contemporary decreased emphasis on traditional Pentecostal taboos in the AG is in part attributable to the charismatic movement, which accelerated a trend already in existence.

==== Changing views on behavior, war and pacifism ====
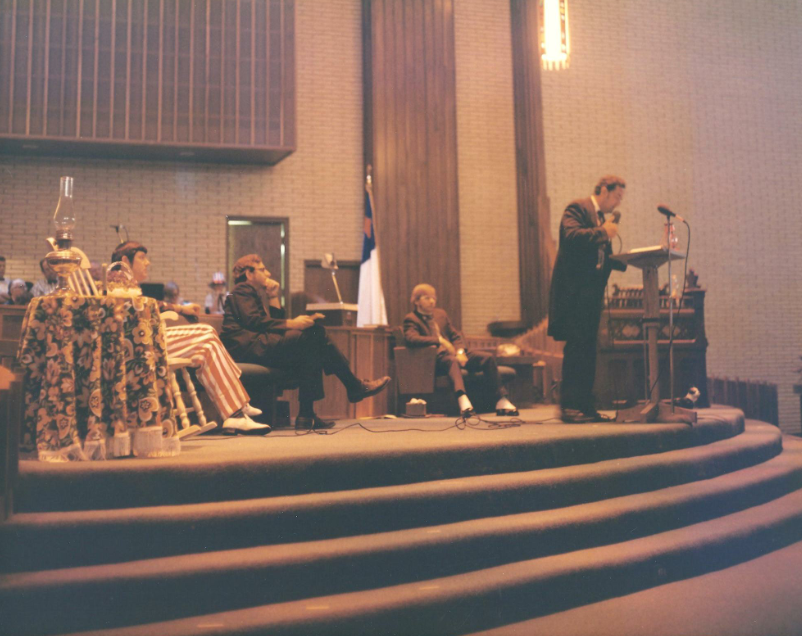
Pastor Ernest Moen preaching at Rockford First Assembly of God on Easter Sunday 1971

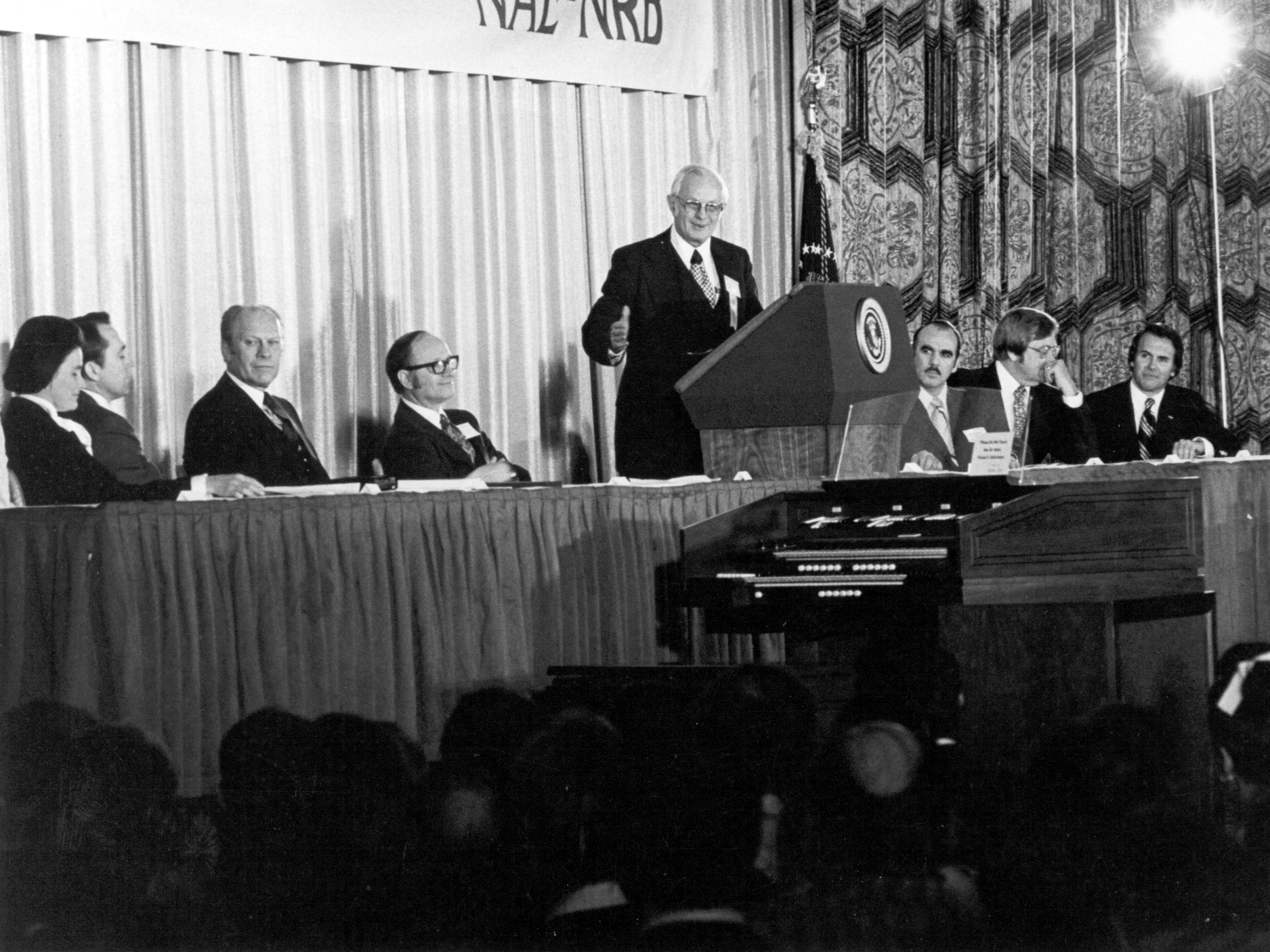
General Superintendent Thomas F. Zimmerman addresses the NAE/NRB Convention in 1976.

Since their movement's emergence early in the 20th century, Pentecostals saw themselves as "peculiar people", and one of the components of this identity were particular prohibitions on behavior. Prohibitions on drug use, gambling, social dancing, consuming alcohol, smoking, attending theaters, bowling, swimming in public pools and beaches, owning television sets, and restrictions on feminine attire and fashion helped distinguish Pentecostals from the larger society. Starting in the 1950s, attitudes in the Assemblies of God on many of these activities underwent dramatic change. The most change probably occurred over views on women's attire, with the former stance against wearing make-up and jewelry giving way to the acceptance of popular fashion. Most of these "holiness standards" are no longer adhered to; however, some are still held to, such as proscriptions on smoking, alcohol and drug use.

For much of its history, the Assemblies of God officially opposed Christian participation in war and was listed by The Pacifist Handbook as America's third largest peace church in 1940. The official position of the church until 1967 encouraged Christian nonviolence: "We . . . are nevertheless constrained to declare we cannot conscientiously participate in war and armed resistance which involves the actual destruction of human life, since this is contrary to our view of the clear teachings of the inspired Word of God". Most of the founders and first generation members of the denomination held to this view, and it was presented as official teaching throughout World War I and World War II. The official pacifist position remained unchanged until 1967 when the denomination affirmed "the right of each member to choose whether to declare their position as a combatant, a noncombatant, or a conscientious objector". This was the culmination of a process begun during World War I, when it was unpopular to hold antiwar views, in which AG adherents questioned their denomination's pacifist stance.

=== Recent history (1980–present) ===
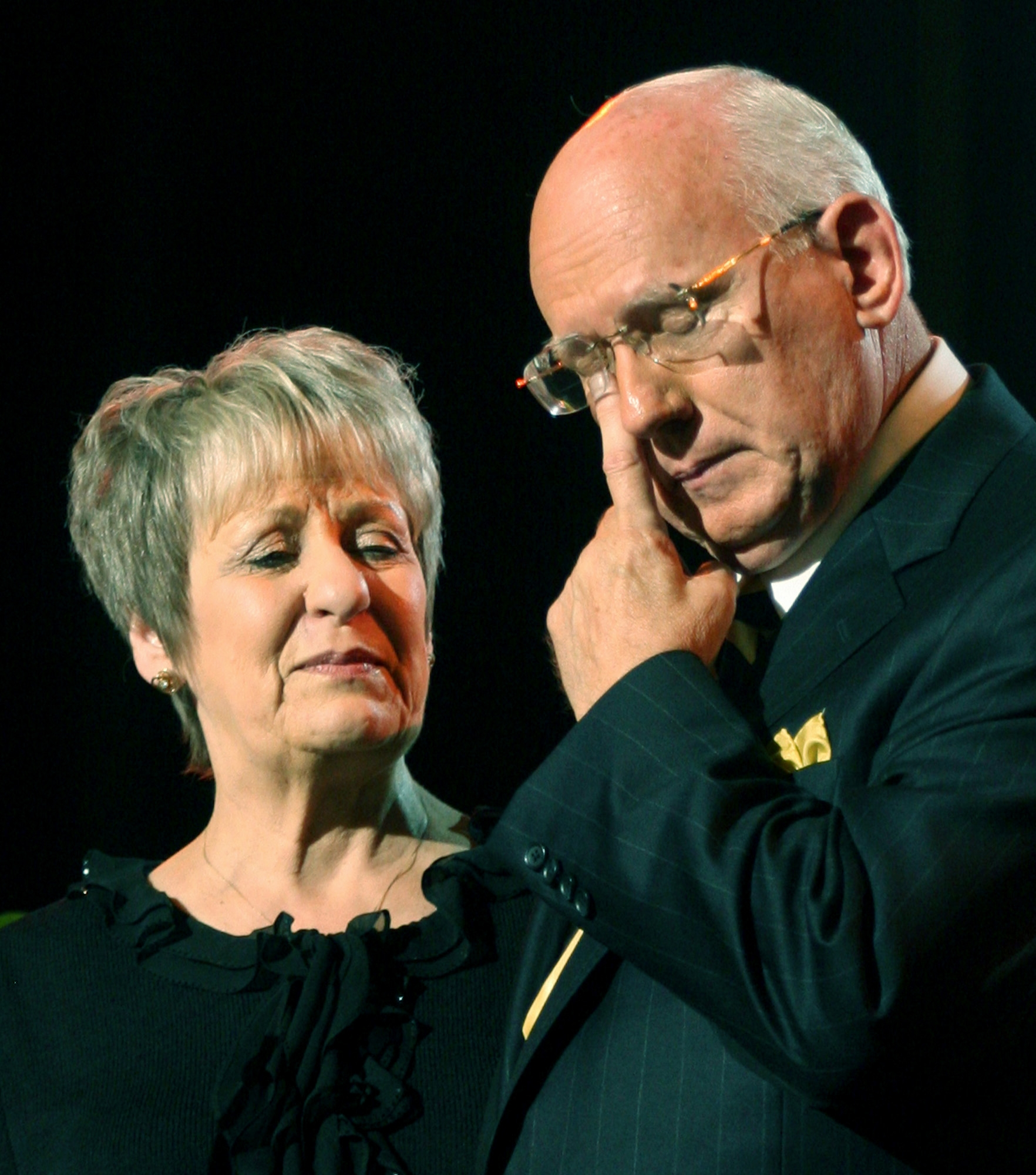
Thomas Trask with his wife. Trask led the AG as general superintendent for 14 years from 1993 to 2007.

==== Numerical growth, Hispanic outreach and racial reconciliation ====
The Assemblies of God emerged as the leading Pentecostal denomination in terms of status, wealth, influence, and global adherence. In the 1980s, the Assemblies of God saw rapid growth in the U.S., for several years ranking as the fastest growing American denomination. This growth was mainly the result of its Hispanic outreach (in 1988 Hispanic members made up some 15 percent of the fellowship's total constituency). The growth of an Asian immigrant constituency was also recognized in this decade when the first Korean district was created. The Assemblies of God gained national visibility in the late 1980s from the popularity and later scandals surrounding two of its ministers, Jimmy Swaggart and Jim Bakker. The Assemblies of God launched an effort to increase evangelism and growth in the 1990s called the "Decade of Harvest". Such efforts failed to sustain the impressive growth of the 1980s, however. From 2003 to 2008, growth had slowed to an average annual increase of just over 1 percent.

With increased growth came increased acceptance and acculturation. Since the 1980s, a growing number of AG ministers have been educated and risen to leadership positions at evangelical institutions, such as Fuller Theological Seminary, Gordon-Conwell, and Trinity Evangelical Divinity School. This "evangelicalization of the Assemblies of God" has led to the weakening of Pentecostal distinctives, especially the doctrine of initial evidence. Other traditional practices, such as holding prayer meetings and altar services, have faded over time as well. Despite the efforts of denominational leaders to reassert Pentecostal identity and remain more than "evangelicals plus tongues", the process of acculturation has continued.

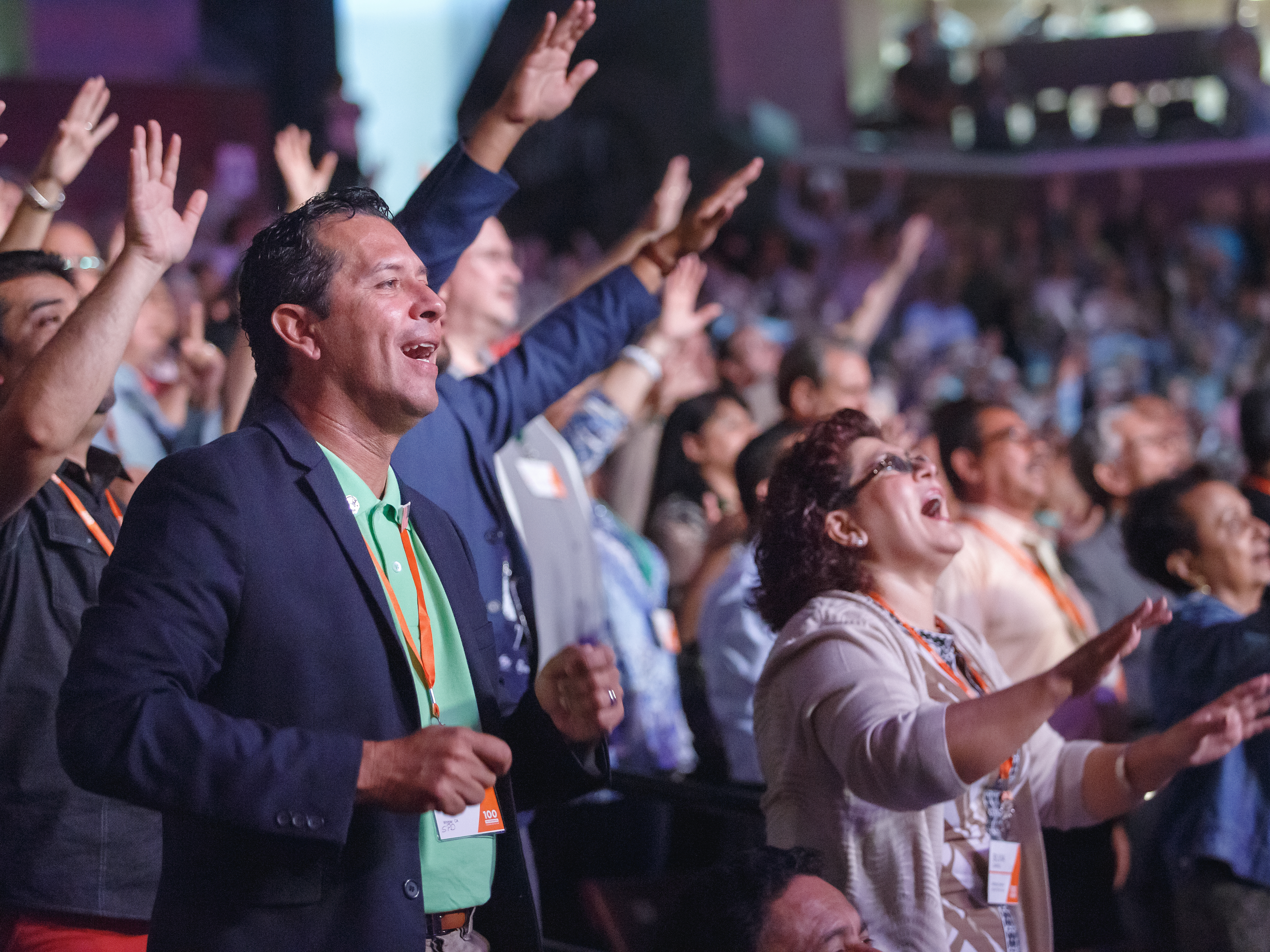
AG Centennial Celebration, August 2014, Springfield, Missouri.

Additionally, the Assemblies of God leadership alongside other predominantly and traditionally white Christian denominations renounced racism during the 1990s, seeking to reconcile with the Church of God in Christ and others following the civil rights movement and its cultural effect on American society. In 2007, according to Joe Newman in Race and the Assemblies of God Church: The Journey from Azusa Street to the "Miracle of Memphis",

...that although current Assemblies of God leaders have embraced the concept of an integrated church fellowship that no longer excludes African Americans, there is virtually no evidence of wide acceptance of this concept at the local church level in the denomination.

==== Revivalism ====
Churches within the Assemblies of God have experienced revivals from the 1990s and early 2000s which featured worship and practices reminiscent of early Pentecostalism. The most prominent of these was the Brownsville Revival, which occurred at the Brownsville Assembly of God in Pensacola, Florida, from 1995 into the early 2000s. These revivals often faced criticism from within and without the Assemblies of God for their unpredictability and the dramatic religious experiences of participants. In the case of the Brownsville Revival, the AG's national leadership gave it cautious approval and support.

==== College ministry controversies ====
Chi Alpha is the Assemblies of God's student organization and college ministry. As of 2024, it operated on 270 campuses.

Chi Alpha's Texan chapters were highlighted by Christianity Today in 2023 for allowing a registered sex offender to serve as a mentor despite knowing of his status. Two Texas pastors who knowingly connected their students with the mentor were removed from their church positions. The Assemblies of God district in North Texas started an investigation to discover if other credentialed ministers had acted similarly. A Baylor University campus minister was arrested on sex abuse charges, and the Baylor chapter was suspended. In 2022, a minister working for Chi Alpha in Corpus Christi, Texas, was charged with sexual abuse of a minor. By the end of January 2024, the Assemblies of God was sued by a parent of an unnamed minor who alleged sexual abuse by members of the organization, and an Orange, Texas-based church disaffiliated with AG over the scandal.

In October 2025, an investigation by NBC News identified 200 pastors, employees, and volunteer leaders accused of sexual abuse involving more than 475 victims, some cases dating back to the 1970s. AG has facilitated the reintegration of several of these pastors and volunteer leaders into leadership positions in churches.

==== LGBT issues ====
The Assemblies of God General Council took a position against homosexuality starting in 1979, which was later reaffirmed. The Assemblies of God also opposes ordination of openly gay or lesbian clergy members. Members of the Assemblies of God have been among the most significant figures opposing homosexuality in the United States. The president of ex-gay organization Exodus International was associated with the Assemblies of God. While LGBTQ students are allowed to participate in Chi Alpha campus ministries, they are not allowed to be student leaders unless they adhere to the belief that homosexual activity is sinful.

== Beliefs ==
=== Fundamental doctrines ===
The primary beliefs of the Assemblies of God are summarized in its Statement of Fundamental Truths. The following is a summary of these essential AG beliefs:

1. The Bible is inspired by God and is "the infallible, authoritative rule of faith and conduct".
2. There is only one true God who exists as a Trinity.
3. Jesus Christ is the Son of God and, as the second person of the Trinity, is God.
4. Man was created good by God but was separated from God through original sin.
5. Salvation "is received through repentance toward God and faith toward the Lord Jesus Christ".
6. There are two ordinances. Believer's baptism by immersion is a declaration to the world that the believer has died and been raised together with Christ, becoming a new creation. The Lord's Supper is a symbol expressing the believer's sharing in the divine nature of Christ, a memorial of Christ's suffering and death, and a prophecy of Christ's second coming.
7. Baptism in the Holy Spirit is a separate and subsequent experience following conversion. Spirit baptism brings empowerment to live an overcoming Christian life and to be an effective witness.
8. Speaking in tongues is the initial physical evidence of the baptism in the Holy Spirit.
9. Sanctification is, "...an act of separation from that which is evil, and of dedication unto God." It occurs when the believer identifies with, and has faith in, Christ in his death and resurrection. It is not believed to be a "second definite work of grace" (see Finished Work), as in some other Pentecostal denominations, but is understood to be a process in that it requires continual yielding to the Holy Spirit.
10. The Church's mission is to seek and save all who are lost in sin; the Church is the Body of Christ and consists of all people who accept Christ, regardless of Christian denomination.
11. Divinely called and scripturally-ordained ministers serve the Church.
12. Divine healing of the sick is provided for in the atonement.
13. The "imminent and blessed hope" of the Church is its rapture preceding the bodily return of Christ to earth.
14. The rapture of the Church will be followed by the visible return of Christ and his reign on earth for a thousand years.
15. There will be a final judgment and eternal damnation for the "wicked dead".
16. There will be future new heavens and a new earth "wherein dwelleth righteousness".

=== Core beliefs ===
The AG considers salvation, baptism in the Holy Spirit with the evidence of speaking in tongues, divine healing and the Second Coming of Christ to be its four core beliefs.

==== Salvation ====
The Statement of Fundamental Truths states, "Man's only hope of redemption is through the shed blood of Jesus Christ the Son of God". The Assemblies of God holds the Arminian position on salvation. While it agrees with the Calvinist position that God is sovereign, at the same time, it believes that humankind has free will—free to accept or reject God's gift of salvation and eternal life. Therefore, the Assemblies of God disapproves of the doctrines of double predestination and the unconditional security of the believer, which holds that once saved it is impossible for a person to be lost. Instead, the Assemblies of God believes that salvation is received and kept by faith, if faith in Christ is lost, then salvation is lost.

==== Baptism in the Holy Spirit ====
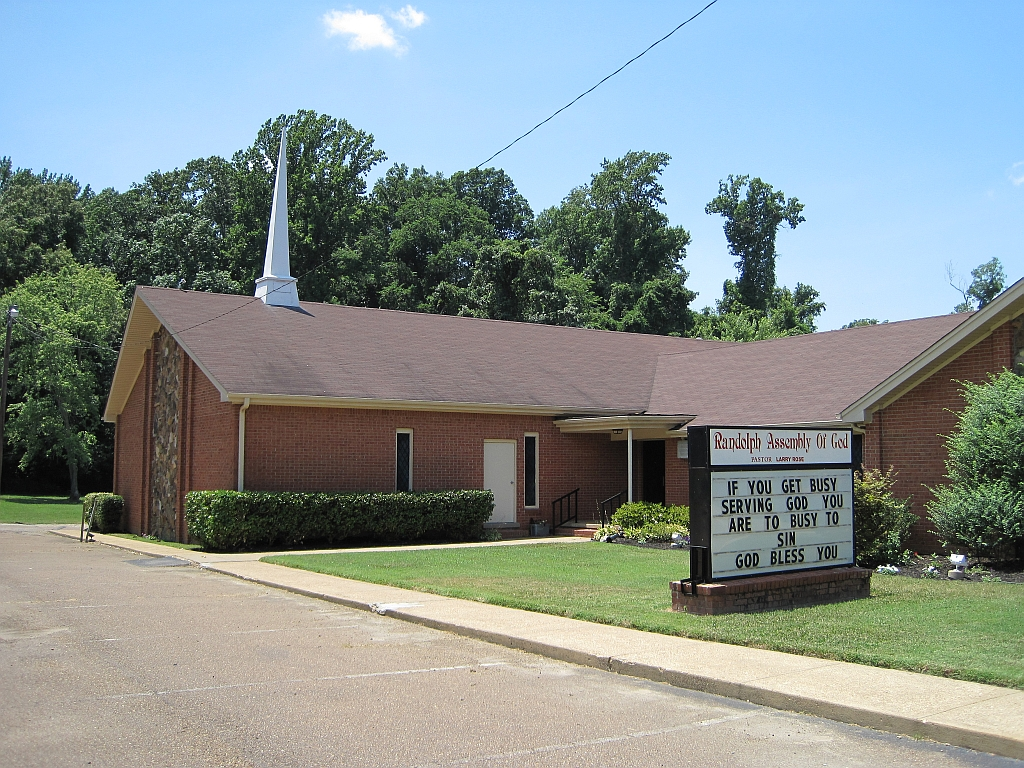
Randolph Assembly of God, Randolph, Tennessee

According to the Statement of Fundamental Truths, "All believers are entitled to and should ardently expect and earnestly seek" the baptism in the Spirit. It also states, "This was the normal experience of all in the early Christian Church". It is a separate experience from and occurs after salvation. This baptism gives to the receiver an "enduement of power for life and service, the bestowment of the gifts and their uses in the work of the ministry". There are four experiences listed in the Fundamental Truths that result from Spirit baptism: "overflowing fullness of the Spirit", "a deepened reverence for God", intensified consecration and dedication to God and his work, and "a more active love for Christ, for His Word and for the lost". In addition, this experience initiates the believer in the use of spiritual gifts. The "initial physical sign" of having received this baptism is "speaking with other tongues as the Spirit of God gives them utterance".

Baptism in the Holy Spirit with the evidence of speaking in tongues is a requirement for ministerial licensing and ordination. However, Spirit baptism and speaking in tongues is not a requirement for membership or participation in an Assembly of God church. An increasing minority of pastors has expressed concern that there is a lack of biblical support for the claim that Spirit baptism must always be accompanied with speaking in tongues. This concern corresponds with a decrease in the number of Assembly of God adherents reporting baptism in the Holy Spirit; according to the AG's Office of Statistics as of 2003 less than 50 percent of adherents had this experience. These challenges to the AG's traditional position were noted in a 2007 report by the AG's Spiritual Life Committee:

Yet, the distinctive doctrine that once united us has, in some circles, become a point of contention. We lament the increasing rarity of the gifts of the Spirit in our worship setting. We wonder where, in our busy church schedules, will people have an opportunity to tarry at the altars for a transforming Pentecostal experience?

Despite these challenges, in 2009, the 53rd General Council passed a resolution reaffirming the doctrine of initial physical evidence.

==== Divine healing ====
The Assemblies of God understands divine healing to have been provided for in the atonement. Looking to scripture, such as James 5 and Isaiah 53:5, the AG believes that Christians can pray for healing. Indeed, it believes scripture gives elders of the church the responsibility to pray "the prayer of faith" over the sick. It believes God can and does heal, but believes that God is sovereign and that, whether one is healed or not, a person's trust must be in God. It sees no conflict in trusting God for healing while receiving medical care. Healing testimonies regularly appear in the official publication, the Pentecostal Evangel, and prayer for healing and testimony commonly occur in church services.

While adamant that divine healing is a reality, the AG is not dogmatic on the subject of how one is healed. Margaret Poloma summarized this view stating, "Physical healing is not certain, automatic, or subject to formula. At the same time, it remains a tenet and practice of the Assemblies of God". Officially, the AG rejects the view that healing is caused or influenced by "positive confession", a belief found in prosperity theology and Word of Faith teachings. Nevertheless, these teachings have influenced some congregations.

==== Christ's Second Coming ====
The Statement of Fundamental Truths articles 13 and 14 articulate the Assemblies of God's official teaching on the return of Christ to Earth. It is a dispensationalist and premillennialist eschatology that includes the pre-Tribulation rapture of the Church—the "imminent and blessed hope". The rapture of the Church will be followed by Christ's visible return to earth and his reign of 1,000 years. This millennial reign will usher in the salvation of the nation of Israel and universal peace. The Assemblies of God is specifically opposed to the theologies and practices of universal salvation, setting dates for Christ's return, and amillennialism.

=== Position statements ===
The Assemblies of God has released statements on various issues not addressed in the Statement of Fundamental Truths. These position papers are usually written by the Doctrinal Purity Commission, a standing committee of the General Council, which reviews and responds to issues referred to it by the Executive Presbytery. Position papers are not official positions of the Assemblies of God unless recommended by the Executive Presbytery and approved by the General Council. Position statements touch on biblical, theological, and social concerns.

- Abstinence from alcohol: On the consumption of alcohol, the AG calls on its members and adherents to live life-styles of total abstinence (see Christianity and alcohol).
- Apostles and Prophets: The Assemblies of God does not recognize titles or offices of "apostle" and "prophet". It does, however, believe there are those in the church who "exercise the ministry function of apostles and prophets". Apostolic functions relate to evangelizing previously unreached areas or people groups, while prophetic functions "occur when believers speak under the anointing of the Spirit to strengthen, encourage, or comfort". "Prophecy is a continuing gift of the Holy Spirit that is broadly distributed as the Spirit wills throughout Pentecostal churches". Predictive prophecy that proves false, or prophecy that "departs from biblical truth" is false prophecy. The AG believes in the four ministry gifts of apostles, prophets, evangelists, and pastor/teachers but notes that there are no biblical instructions for the appointment of apostles and prophets today.
- Assisted suicide and abortion: Viewing all human life as sacred, the Assemblies of God opposes assisted suicide and abortion (unless it is medically confirmed that the mother's life is in imminent danger). It believes scripture is silent on the use of contraception and therefore takes no position on this subject.
- Creation: The Assemblies of God believes that the Genesis creation narrative "accurately communicates God's creation of the heavens and the earth" and that "the New Testament treats the creation and fall of Adam and Eve as historical events". It acknowledges that Christians will have different views on "the age of the earth, the age of humankind, and the ways in which God went about the creative processes" but urges them to "avoid divisiveness over debatable theories of creation". It also affirms that "God reveals himself both in Scripture and the created order" (see: creationism).
- Demon Possession: The Assemblies of God believes it is possible for people to be demon possessed and be delivered by the "power of the Spirit, and the name of Jesus". However, it cautions against overemphasis on demonology and rejects the belief that Christians can be possessed by evil spirits.
- Ministry to the disabled: The AG teaches that people with disabilities are loved by God. They should be treated with dignity and fully included in the life of the Church.
- Divorce and remarriage: Officially, the AG disapproves of Christians divorcing for any cause except "fornication and adultery". Where these circumstances exist or where a Christian has been divorced by an unbeliever (see Pauline privilege), the AG allows "the question of remarriage to be resolved by the believer in the Light of God's Word". For Christians who were divorced and remarried before their conversion, it is recommended that local AG churches receive them as members. The General Council has offered this guideline for AG churches; however, churches are free to determine their own standards of membership with the result that many local churches will admit divorced and remarried persons as members even if the above conditions are not met (see Christian views on divorce).
- Gambling: The AG opposes gambling, believing that it is a disregard of responsible stewardship, involves a chance of gain at the expense and suffering of others, is inconsistent with the work ethic of scripture, and tends to be habit forming.
- Homosexuality: The fellowship takes the position that the biblical ideal of marriage is between one man and one woman and that the Bible condemns all sex outside marriage, whether heterosexual or homosexual. Furthermore, it emphasizes that "believers who struggle with homosexual temptations must be encouraged and strengthened by fellow Christians" and that believers "must hold no malice toward, or fear, of homosexuals" but "reach out in humility and compassion".
- Positive Confession: While the AG affirms that "All the blessings which God has for His people are received through faith" (including salvation, Spirit baptism, "divine preservation", "healing and provision of material needs", and the motivation to witness), it rejects the teaching that faith or "positive confession" "compels God's action". It holds that believers must consider the totality of scripture, consider adequately the will of God, recognize that they can expect suffering in life, and recognize the sovereignty of God. It also stresses the importance of persistent prayer, as opposed to simply confessing or "claiming" the promises of God.
- Women's role in ministry: The AG affirms the ministry of women in the church and allows them to be ordained and serve in pastoral roles (see: ordination of women).

== Worship ==
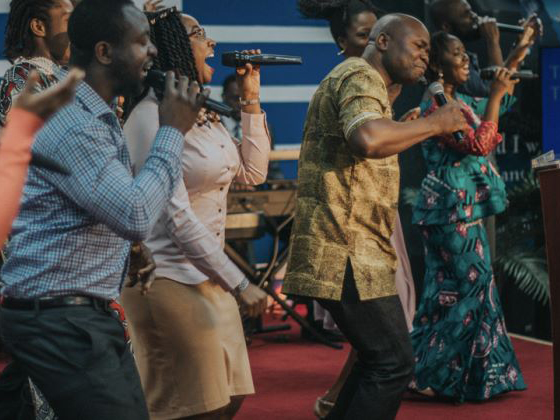
Crossroads Fellowship Church, Omaha, Nebraska

Because of the congregational nature of the Assemblies of God, it is difficult to define a typical local church. Church identity is influenced by members' social class, ethnicity, and musical or worship style preferences. Sociologists Margaret Poloma and John Green have categorized AG congregations into four types: traditional, evangelical, renewalist, and alternative. Traditional congregations are those that strongly identify with the AG (and Pentecostalism in general), while encouraging "more intense experiences of the charismata, or gifts of the Holy Spirit" such as Spirit baptism and speaking in tongues. Evangelical AG congregations, the most common type, identify with the AG and Pentecostalism but "are moving (in varying degrees) away from the unique experiences that were once important markers of Pentecostal identity". Renewalist or charismatic AG churches are those that encourage supernatural gifts of the Spirit but weakly identify with the AG or Pentecostalism. Alternative churches are those where both identity with the AG and occurrence of unique Pentecostal experiences are low; these include churches adopting seeker-sensitive and emerging church models.

Despite the diversity found in the AG, shared beliefs and values are reflected in local churches. The Assemblies of God is "experience-oriented", and the local church is where experience of the activity of the Holy Spirit will primarily occur. Regular services are usually held on Sunday mornings and Sunday and Wednesday evenings. There is no formal liturgy or order of service; though, many churches have a familiar routine: opening prayer, congregational and special singing, an offering, a time of intercessory prayer, a sermon, and an altar call. In the traditional and charismatic AG churches, this routine is subject to change spontaneously within a service—possibly being interrupted by an interpretation of a message in tongues, a prophecy, a word of wisdom, or a word of knowledge—and this change is believed to be directed by the Holy Spirit. In addition, evening services may incorporate a time of prayer for those who are seeking something from God either around the altar or in an adjacent prayer room.

During praise and worship, participants may raise their hands as an act of worship. Congregational singing is usually led by a choir or worship team. Full drum sets, a piano, an organ, and various other instruments are frequently used. The type of music sung is generally popular worship choruses, such as those by Calvary Chapel and Hillsong. Worship is often characterized as intense and enthusiastic.

Prayer features prominently in services. Services may feature moments where special prayer is offered, often with laypersons leading the prayer and the rest of the congregation audibly participating. During these corporate prayers, some may pray in tongues. While not in every service, the pastor will pray for the sick. This prayer may include the pastor anointing the sick with olive oil and with the assistance of church elders along with pastoral associates laying hands on the one seeking healing.

Architecturally, smaller churches will feature bright lighting, large windows, a simple platform with a pulpit in the center, and an altar ("a bench across the front of the church below the platform"). Larger churches will have direct access from the balcony to the main sanctuary near the platform so that respondents to altar calls can easily come forward, a large open area in front of the platform to accommodate altar call gatherings, and the platform itself is usually large to accommodate a large choir and musical instruments. Because the Assemblies of God practice baptism by immersion, many churches will include a baptistry at the rear of the platform.

== Organization and leadership ==
The Assemblies of God is defined in its constitution as a "cooperative fellowship" of "churches and credentialed ministers". It has a representative form of government derived from presbyterian polity and organized in three levels of administration: congregations, district councils and the General Council. The AG has, however, elements of congregational polity, which are limited by the powers of the districts and AG General Council to license and discipline ministers.

=== Congregations ===
==== Self-governing churches ====
The Assemblies of God uses several classifications of congregations based on their level of local autonomy and their relationship to the General Council. Mature, fully functioning congregations are classified as "General Council affiliated churches". These churches are "sovereign" and self-governing, but in matters of doctrine local assemblies are subordinate to districts and the General Council. A church is qualified for General Council affiliated status if it: accepts AG doctrines; adopts a standard of membership; has an active voting membership of at least 20 persons; adopts a governance model that prevents a pastor or governing body from "exert[ing] dictatorial control over a church"; has an adequate number of spiritually qualified members to fill the offices of the church; and has made provision for a pastor who is a credentialed minister in good standing with the General Council.

Each local church operates according to its own bylaws and calls its own pastor. The office of pastor is equivalent to that of elder or overseer and is tasked with preaching and teaching the Word of God, in addition to conducting the day-to-day operations of the church. Laypersons are elected as a board of deacons to assist the pastor. A General Council affiliated church may withdraw from the Assemblies of God by a two-thirds vote of the church membership.

At the request of the pastor, deacon board, or 30 percent of voting members, district officials may intervene in the internal affairs of a General Council affiliated church. If district leaders conclude that district supervision is warranted, the church will lose its status as a self-governing church and revert to the status of "district affiliated assembly" until its problems are resolved. A church may also revert to district affiliated status if it no longer meets the minimum requirements for General Council membership, such as having less than 20 voting members.

==== District affiliated and cooperative churches ====
Local churches, sections, and district councils are able to establish new churches. A church plant may initially be classified as "district affiliated" until it meets requirements for General Council affiliation. District affiliated congregations are under the direct supervision of district officials but are encouraged to develop into fully self-governing churches. In 2009, the General Council created a new category called "parent affiliated churches". These are either church plants or campuses of a multi-site church under the supervision of a General Council affiliated "parent" church.

Existing Pentecostal churches considering affiliation with the General Council may request temporary status as a "cooperating assembly" for a term of four years before officially joining the denomination.

=== Districts ===
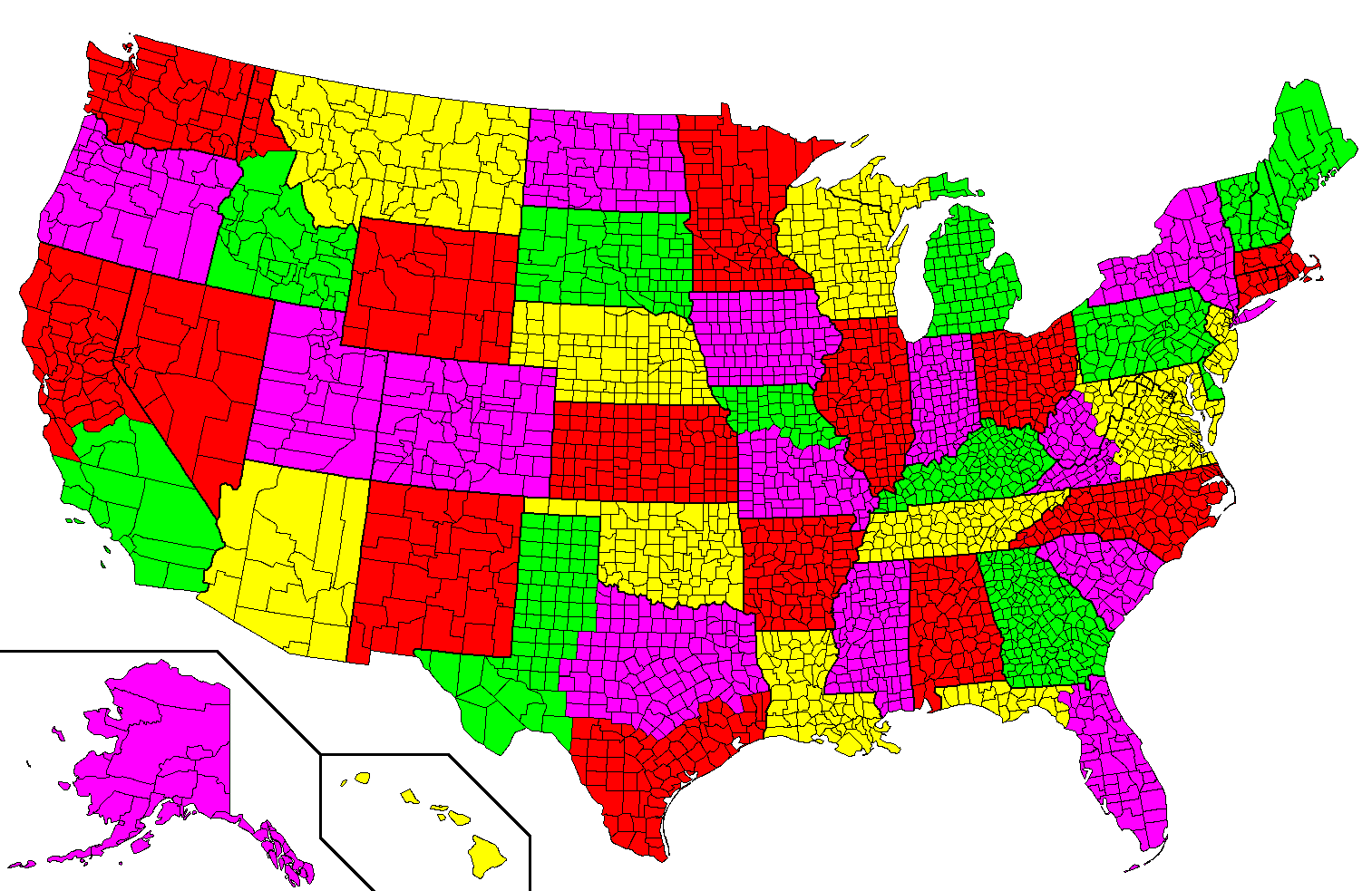
Map of districts of the Assemblies of God in the United States

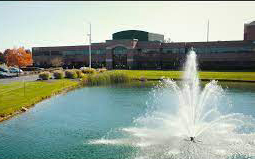
Ohio Ministry Network Office, Columbus, Ohio

Churches are organized into sections and sections into middle judicatories called districts. The 66 districts oversee "all the ecclesial and sacerdotal activities" within their jurisdiction, which includes recommending ministers for national credentialing and mediating disputes within local congregations. There are two types of districts. Geographical districts serve areas corresponding to state boundaries, while non-geographical language or ethnic districts serve a particular language or ethnic group, such as Hispanic and Samoan churches.

Districts are governed by representative bodies called district councils, which meet annually. District council membership includes all resident ministers and one lay delegate per AG church located within the district. When the district council is not in session, a district is led by a superintendent and a presbytery (board of directors) whose members are elected by and represent the sections. A presbyter "minister[s] to ministers" and "model[s] spiritual maturity and leadership" to the ministers and churches in his section.

=== General Council ===
At the top of this organizational framework is the biennial General Council, the highest governing body of the Assemblies of God. All ordained and licensed ministers and one delegate per Assembly of God church are entitled to attend and participate at the General Council. The size of General Council is not static but fluctuating, changing from year to year as there is no requirement that pastors attend or that churches send delegates. In general, however, there are over 3,000 voting members. (Note: In 2005, there were present 4,135 voting delegates. In 2007, 4,350 voting members attended. In 2009, 3,741 voting delegates were present. See 2005 General Council Minutes p. 47, Minutes 2007, p. 35, and Minutes 2009, p. 61.)

The General Council enacts legislation, credentials ministers, oversees the national and worldwide missions programs, and directs the church's colleges and seminary. The General Council also elects the general superintendent—the chief executive officer of the national organization—and other officers, such as the assistant general superintendent, general secretary, general treasurer, and the directors of U.S. and world missions. These manage the AG's day-to-day operations and work together as the Executive Leadership Team.

In between General Council sessions, approximately 300 elected representatives from the various districts and foreign mission areas meet as the General Presbytery. When the General Council is not in session, the General Presbytery acts as the official policy-making body of the Assemblies of God. A 21-member Executive Presbytery meets bimonthly and functions as the Assemblies of God's board of directors. Executive Presbyters are responsible to the General Presbytery and are ex officio members of that body.

=== General Superintendent ===
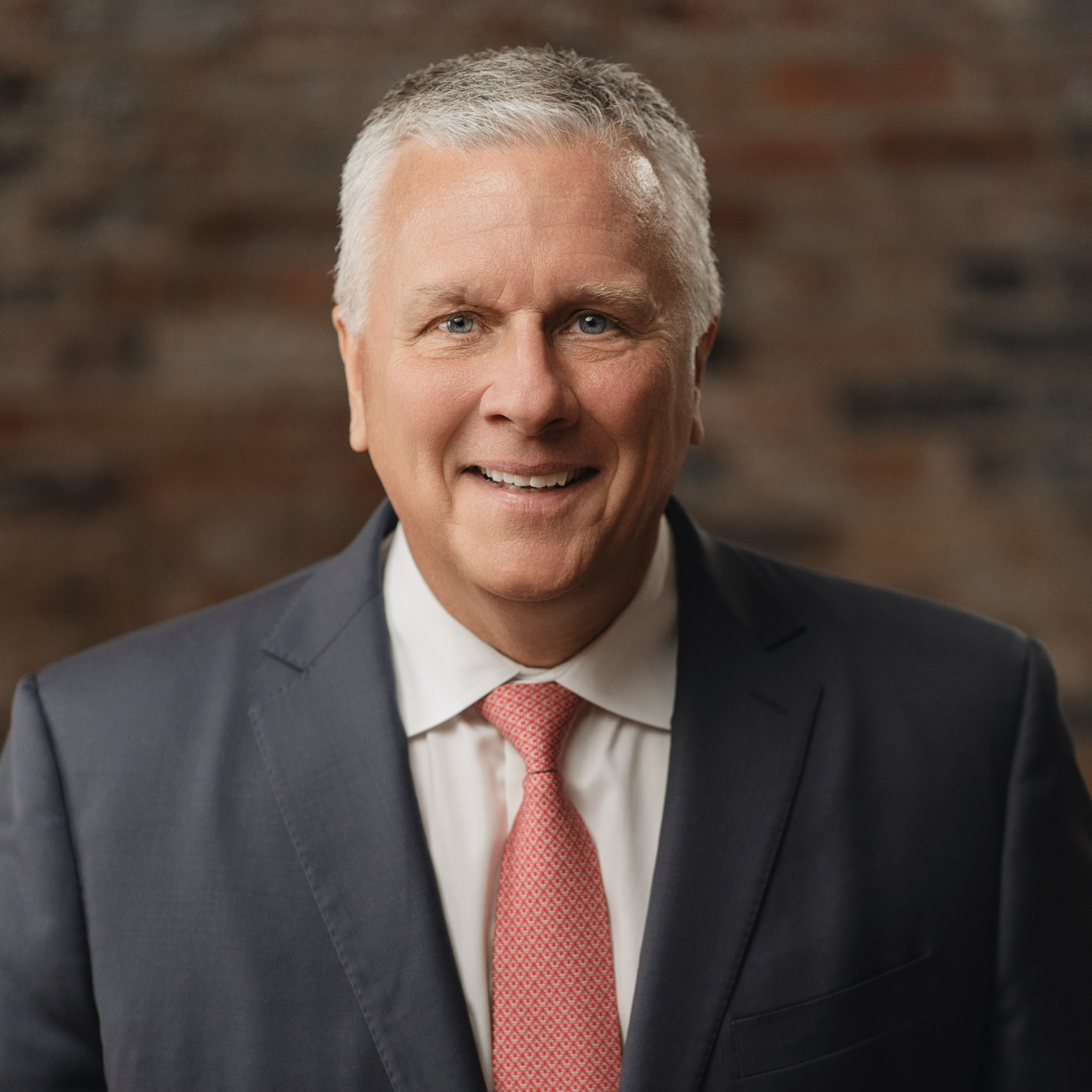
Doug Clay was elected General Superintendent of the AG in 2017.

The office of General Superintendent was originally known as the Chairman of the General Council, until it was changed in 1927. Doug Clay is the current general superintendent.

The following is a list of General Superintendents and their tenures:

#	Name	Appointment	Secession	Time in
1	Eudorus N. Bell	1914	1914	7 months
2	A.P. Collins	1914	1915	1 year
3	John W. Welch	1915	1920	5 years
-	Eudorus N. Bell	1920	1923	3 years
-	John W. Welch	1923	1925	2 years
4	W.T. Gaston	1925	1929	4 years
5	Ernest S. Williams	1929	1949	20 years
6	Wesley R. Steelberg	1949	1952	3 years
7	Gayle F. Lewis	1952	1953	14 months
8	Ralph M. Riggs	1953	1959	6 years
9	Thomas F. Zimmerman	1959	1985	26 years
10	G. Raymond Carlson	1985	1993	8 years
11	Thomas E. Trask	1993	2007	14 years
12	George O. Wood	2007	2017	10 years
13	Doug E. Clay	2017	-	-

=== Clergy ===
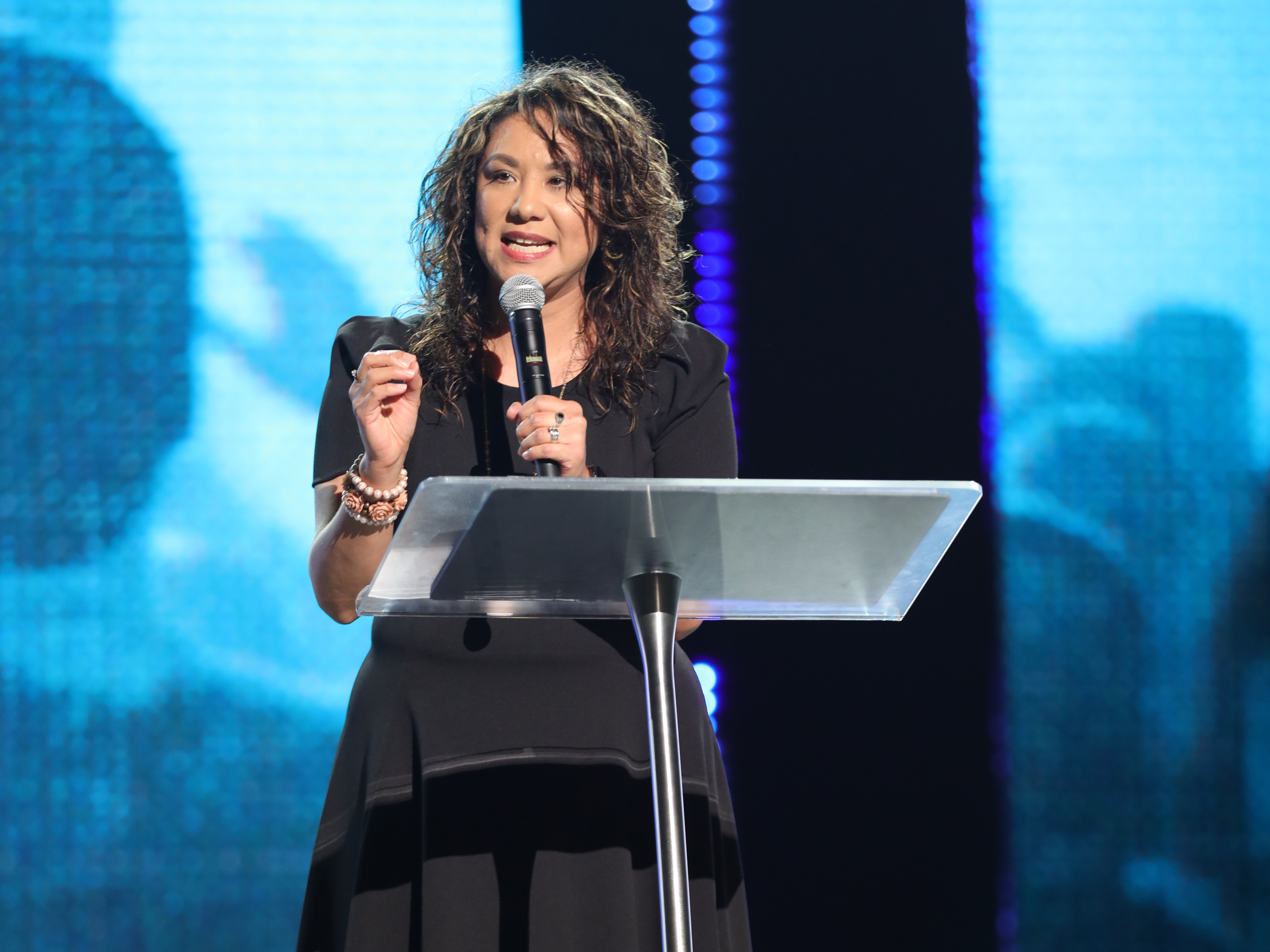
Melissa Alfaro, Executive Presbyter, and Pastor from Houston, Texas

The Assemblies of God recognizes three classifications of ministers: certified, licensed, and ordained. District councils examine candidates for all levels of ministry and recommend those qualified to the Executive Presbytery (which is the General Council's Credentials Committee), which has authority to issue ministerial credentials. The AG's constitution guarantees that "formal academic achievement (diploma or degree) shall not be a requirement for credentials", but the General Presbytery does mandate courses and examinations.

In preparation for receiving credentials, applicants must either complete correspondence courses through Global University (the AG's distance education program), receive training through a postsecondary institution such as a college or seminary approved by the AG, or be recommended by a district credentials committee as qualifying for credentials based on self-study and ministerial experience of "substantial duration". In addition, applicants must pass a standardized exam that tests their knowledge of the Bible, AG doctrines, and ministerial practices. After passing the exam, they are interviewed by their district's credentials committee. If judged qualified, the district will recommend the applicant to the General Council credentials committee.

The Assemblies of God will not grant credentials to divorced and remarried persons if either partner has a former spouse living unless for specific exceptions. Exceptions include if the divorce occurred prior to an applicant's conversion or for "scriptural causes" such as a former spouse's marital unfaithfulness or the abandonment of a Christian by a non-Christian partner (see Pauline privilege). The Executive Presbytery has authority to issue ecclesiastical annulments in cases involving conditions that prevent "the creation of a valid marriage union", such as fraud. Clergy are also barred from membership in secret societies.

The Assemblies also recognize a local church credential, which can be issued by a General Council affiliated church for those engaged only in local ministry, such as prison or hospital ministry. Local church credential holders may perform the ordinances of the church with the authorization of the issuing church's senior pastor.

In 2008, there were a total of 34,178 Assemblies of God ministers (excluding local church credentials). Of these, 11,544 were senior pastors and 6,730 were female.

== Missions and affiliated organizations ==
=== National and international missions ===
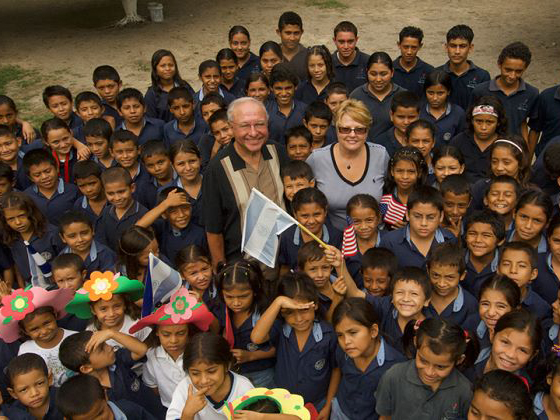
John Bueno served as AG World Missions Executive Director (1997-2011).

Missionary work outside of the United States is overseen by Assemblies of God World Missions. As of December 2009, AG World Missions was reporting 2,719 personnel worldwide. The agency also provides medical evangelism through HealthCare Ministries, founded in 1983 as the Medical Missions Program. This ministry provides free optical, dental, and medical care as well as evangelism. It has operated in 86 countries since its founding.

Missions in the United States are overseen by Assemblies of God U.S. Missions. Its seven departments include chaplaincy, Chi Alpha Campus Ministries, church planting, U.S. Mission America Placement Service (MAPS), intercultural ministries, Teen Challenge, and Youth Alive. MAPS offers volunteers the opportunity to contribute to U.S. missions in several ways. One is through church construction and evangelism, and another is through short or long term missions through summer and missionary associate programs. Youth Alive oversees missionary outreach to elementary and high schools. In 2010, U.S. Missions reported 1,059 appointed missionaries, candidates, and spouses. The same year, it reported 542 endorsed chaplains.

=== Ministries ===
The following are some of the notable ministries and programs of the Assemblies of God USA:

- Convoy of Hope
- Chi Alpha
- Mpact Girls Clubs
- Royal Rangers
- Teen and Junior Bible Quiz

=== Education ===
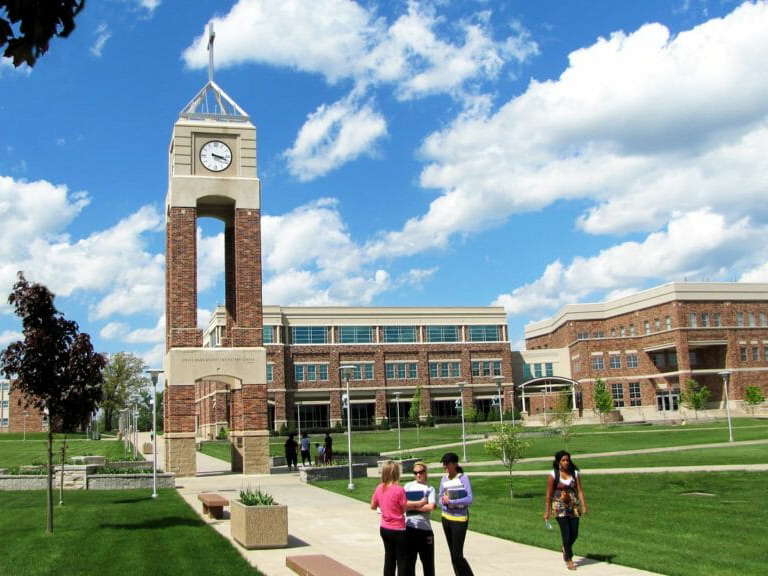
Evangel University, Springfield, Missouri

In the United States, the Assemblies of God endorses 10 Bible colleges, 7 universities, and the Assemblies of God Theological Seminary. Enrollment for all AG endorsed colleges and universities was 17,214 for 2015.

Assemblies of God churches operate 842 Christian schools, which may have membership with the Association of Christian Teachers and Schools (ACTS), incorporated as the Association of Assemblies of God Christian Schools in 1992. In 2008, there were 105,563 students enrolled in these schools.

=== Publishing ===
The Assemblies of God operates Gospel Publishing House, located in Springfield, Missouri, which publishes books, curriculum, and church ministry resources primarily for Pentecostals and charismatics, but also for the general evangelical market. The Assemblies of God publishes Influence Magazine, a resource for Pentecostal pastors and leaders. As a digital publication, AG News is the official news source of the Assemblies of God, providing inspiring articles about AG members, ministers and churches. AG World Missions publishes Worldview, a bimonthly magazine with stories from around the globe.

== Demographics ==
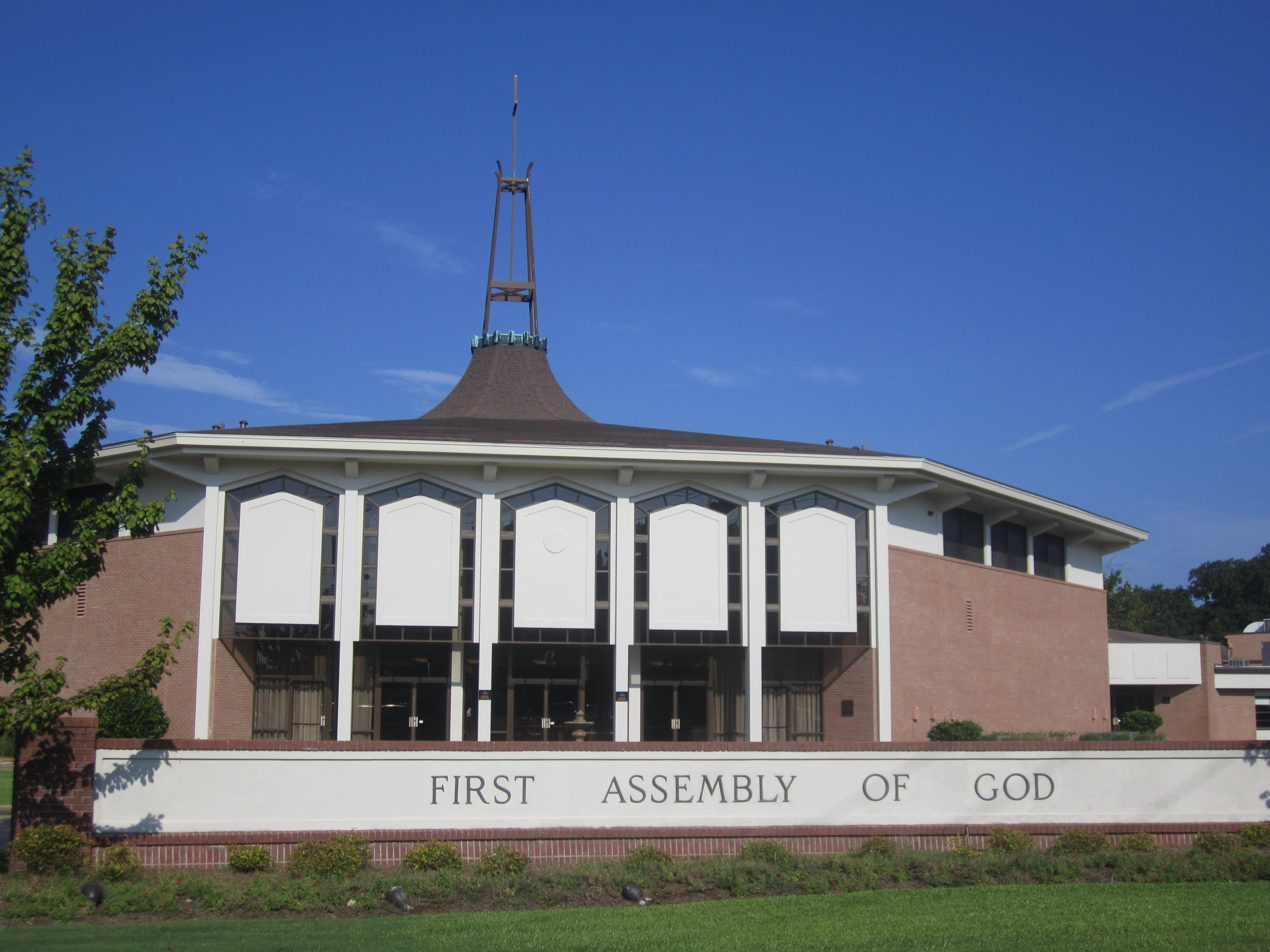
First Assembly of God, West Monroe, Louisiana

=== Membership ===
The Assemblies of God in the United States "has grown steadily during the 20th century". In 1925, there were just 50,386 members in 909 churches. By the early 1970s, membership reached 1 million. Its most rapid growth occurred from 1971 to 1984, when the AG grew from a constituency of around 1 million to 2 million over a 13-year period. In 2019, the number of adherents reached 3,295,923.

Between 2013 and 2023, the denomination's size decreased by 143,505 adherents, a change of 4.6 percent. The AG experienced three consecutive years of declining membership between 2020 and 2022. In 2023, the number of adherents increased by 56,209 (1.9 percent) to a total of 2,984,352. Average weekly attendance was 1,839,535 in 2023. The AG claimed 1.74 million members, as distinguished from adherents, in 2023. The AG reported 12,681 churches and 37,885 ministers for 2023. In 2024, the AG reported 3.06 million adherents and 1.8 million members.

Members are well distributed across the United States. California has the largest number of members, followed by Texas and Florida. However, the states with the highest membership rates are Oklahoma, Arkansas, Alaska, Montana, and Hawaii. Growing AG congregations tend to be located in suburban areas, as opposed to urban and rural ones.

=== Ethnic diversity ===
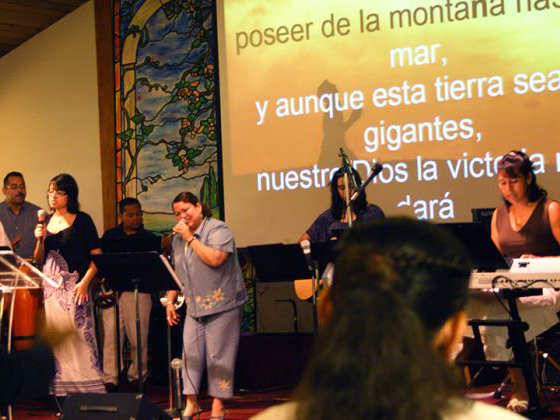
Maranatha Chapel, Evergreen Park, Illinois

The ethnic diversity of the Assemblies of God USA has historically increased among the Hispanic and Latino communities; however, its constituency is still largely white. From 1990 to 2000, there was a slight decline in white AG churches while ethnic churches, mainly Hispanic, were responsible for much of the denomination's numerical growth. In 2001, ethnic minorities represented 29% of the 2,627,029 AG constituents; as of 2022, representation grew to 43.9%, making the AG one of the most ethnically diverse denominations in the U.S as of 2015. While largely and administratively composed of older white males through much of its history, as of 2023, the AG Executive Presbytery now includes nine ethnic minorities including three females.

In 2022, AG adherents were 56.2% non-Hispanic white, 22.6% Hispanic and Latino, 10.4% black or African American, 4.6% Asian/Pacific Islander, and 1.5% Native American. The remaining 4.8 percent were classified as other/mixed.

The AG has created several language districts to serve immigrant communities whose primary language is not English. There are 12 Spanish and two Korean language districts, as well as Brazilian district, Puerto Rico district, Samoan district, and Slavic district. In 2022, the language districts oversaw 2,560 churches with a combined membership of 334,653.

== See also ==
- List of Assemblies of God people
- Megachurches affiliated with the Assemblies of God
- Protestantism in the United States
- Christianity in the United States
