= WQFL =

WQFL may refer to:

- WQFL (FM), a radio station (100.9 FM) licensed to Rockford, Illinois, United States
