= Thomas Zimmerman (disambiguation) =

Thomas Zimmerman (1838–1914) was a writer and translator.

Thomas Zimmerman may also refer to:

- Thomas G. Zimmerman, inventor of the data glove
- Thomas F. Zimmerman (1912–1991), General Superintendent of the Assemblies of God

== See also ==
- Deadmau5 (Joel Thomas Zimmerman, born 1981), Canadian music producer, DJ, and musician
