= Chi Alpha =

Christian fellowship and student society

- ΧΑ
- Founded: 1953; 73 years ago Missouri State University
- Type: Christian fellowship
- Affiliation: Assemblies of God USA
- Status: Active
- Emphasis: Pentecostalism
- Scope: International
- Motto: "We are therefore Christ's ambassadors, as though God were making His appeal through us. We implore you on Christ's behalf, be reconciled to God." (2 Corinthians 5:20)
- Pillars: Community, Creativity, Diversity, Excellence, Integrity, Servant-Leadership, and Evangelism
- Colors: Black, White, Gray, and Red
- Symbol: Christogram
- Philanthropy: Convoy of Hope
- Chapters: 266
- Nickname: Christ's Ambassadors
- Headquarters: 1445 North Boonville Avenue; Springfield, Missouri 65802; United States
- Website: chialpha.com

Chi Alpha | ΧΑ (sometimes XA, χα, xa, or SfC - Students for Christ, officially known as Chi Alpha Christian Fellowship), is an international and interdenominational, coeducational Christian fellowship, social club, student society, and service organization founded in 1953 on the campus of Missouri State University (then known as Southwest Missouri State College) in Springfield, Missouri. Chi Alpha is sponsored by the Assemblies of God USA.

Chi Alpha adheres to the AGUSA Statement of 16 Fundamental Truths. Its stated mission is "to reconcile students to Jesus Christ, thereby transforming the university, the marketplace, and the world..." It describes its core values or pillars as community, creativity, diversity, excellence, integrity, servant-leadership, and evangelism. Its self-described five-fold approach is prayer, worship, fellowship, discipleship, and mission. One of its philanthropic and service organization affiliations is the Convoy of Hope. Through its campus ministries and fellowships, Chi Alpha operates a missionary internship program through the World Assemblies of God Fellowship, requiring doctrinal assent.

Since the beginning of the 21st century, Chi Alpha Christian Fellowship's campus ministries have fluctuated from 310 locations in 2010, to 350 in 2019, and 266 as of 2026. The organization and its leadership have also been subjected to controversies involving the LGBT community, and sexual and psychological abuse with former members alleging "cult-like" personalities. In May 2023, Christianity Today and other outlets reported a registered sex offender was knowingly allowed to continued ministering to Chi Alpha students for more than 30 years. Since these reports, a website has been launched and dedicated against abuses within Chi Alpha and Assemblies of God.

== Etymology ==
The name Chi Alpha was inspired by the contemporary Assemblies of God youth movement, Christ's Ambassadors (reflection a phrase in 2 Corinthians 5:20). The initials "CA" were changed to the Greek alphabet initials "ΧΑ" (and its Latin Script's stylized equivalent of "XA") to resemble the names of other college organizations, in particular Greek-letter fraternities and sororities. Outside of North America, it is also known as SfC - Students for Christ in Europe, and Conexión or UConexión in Latin America.

== History ==
Chi Alpha Christian Fellowship originates from within Assemblies of God USA as a ministry to collegians in 1947 at the urging of J. Robert Ashcroft, the father of John Ashcroft, consisting of a newsletter sent to college students to encourage them in their faith.

After Ashcroft's newsletter publications, it soon became apparent that a newsletter by itself was inadequate, and so in 1953 Dr. J. Calvin Holsinger chartered the first Assemblies of God student group at Missouri State University (formerly Southwest Missouri State University) in Springfield, Missouri where the Assemblies of God and Assemblies of God USA headquarters is located. (Note: The Assemblies of God USA was originally established in Arkansas upon separating from the historically African-American Church of God in Christ in 1914 in disagreement with episcopal governance and other controversies about race relations in the United States.) The movement inspired and sponsored by Assemblies of God quickly spread to other campuses. For example, the first Chi Alpha to own property was the UC Berkeley chapter, which purchased a house next to campus in 1964.

Chi Alpha began its development internationally in the 1970s, establishing chapters in Europe under the name Students for Christ, and also into Latin America under various names.

At the 1977 Chi Alpha Campus Ministers Conference, chairman C. David Gable met with six other personnel, who collectively became known as the San Antonio Seven to develop an approach to local campus ministry. Subsequently, a document approved by the AG Executive Presbytery established a concise set of ministry principles centered on a fourfold philosophy of worship, fellowship, discipleship, and witness, adapted from Acts 2:42-47. Gable explained, “Our goals are more than evangelism; they include stabilizing, maturing, and drawing out the dynamics of the body of Christ.”

In 1979, Dennis Gaylor became national director of Chi Alpha and served until April 2013, making him the longest-tenured leader of the organization. In a significant move in 1986, Chi Alpha switched from being under the purview of the AG’s Youth Department to a division of AG U.S. Missions. The change recognized Chi Alpha as a mission and the university campus as a mission field. Chi Alpha evolved from a loosely knit, disparate band of campus workers scattered across the nation in the 1980s to a solid group of trained and qualified missionaries in the 1990s.

By 1985, Annie Dillard wrote a widely reprinted essay—"Singing with the Fundamentalists"—about her experiences singing with a group of students from the Chi Alpha chapter at Western Washington University (a chapter which operated under the local name of Campus Christian Fellowship).

In 2013, following Gaylor's leadership, he was then succeeded in leadership led by Scott Martin, up to 2023. Following Martin's resignation in November 2023, Severin Lwali became "transitional stakeholder" of the organization. Lwali, a native of Kenya, remains the director of Chi Alpha International as of 2025, while Alex Rodriguez serves as the Senior National Director.

== Chapters ==
Chi Alpha within the United States has a large presence throughout the South and Midwest. Globally, its second-largest presence is in Europe, within some predominantly and historically Catholic and Eastern Orthodox countries of Western, Central, and Mediterranean Europe. At the beginning of the 21st century, there have been Chi Alpha ministries and fellowships on over 310 campuses throughout the United States as of 2010. As of December 2024, Chi Alpha had a presence at 270 campuses throughout the United States, and as of June 2026, its presence declined to 266 campus ministries and fellowships.

== Controversies ==
Throughout the organization's history, it has been involved in numerous controversies involving the LGBT community, sexual, psychological abuse, and religious abuse. For instance, Chi Alpha chapters at Georgetown University and the University of New Hampshire were highlighted in a 2003 article in The New York Times entitled "Of Bart and Homer, and the Many Ways of Faith"—an article about their use of The Simpsons as a Bible study tool. Additionally, in the 2014-2015 school year, Chi Alpha at CSU Stanislaus was removed from campus because they required that their leaders be Christians. The case gained national attention through conservative news channel Fox News. The chapter was eventually reinstated after a year-long dispute between Chi Alpha and the campus.

In 2019, Chi Alpha's Winona State University fellowship was highlighted by former members for allegations of students following "cult-like" personalities. Its campus leader was alleged of favoritism and shaming student party-goers and drinkers; additional allegations included mishandling sexual abuse and psychological abuse. In 2020, a student from the University of Virginia alleged discrimination after coming out and being forced to step down. A year later, from 2021 to 2022, the fellowship was highlighted for leadership's accusations of discrimination against the LGBT community, students having premarital sex, and students who consume alcohol.

=== Sexual abuse ===
In July 2022, a pastor working for Chi Alpha was arrested for "continuous sexual abuse of a child," pleading innocence. In May 2023, Christianity Today and other outlets reported the organization's platforming of registered sexual offender, Daniel Savala, for more than thirty years. As a result, according to a Dallas, Texas-based law firm, demands have been made to limit the activity of Chi Alpha on multiple college and university campuses. A website was also published, dedicated against abuses within Chi Alpha and the Assemblies of God. On May 21, 2023, board members and elders of a North Texas Assemblies of God church dismissed a pastor of the Texas A&M Chi Alpha chapter and Mountain Valley Fellowship linked to the sex abuse scandal.

On May 25, 2023, a Chi Alpha campus minister for Baylor University was arrested on child sex abuse charges. At the Baylor ministry, the campus chapter has opposed the university allowing an organization for LGBT students. The Baylor chapter was suspended during the sex abuse scandal.

In June 2023, Savala was arrested. The Christian Post reported that the Assemblies of God USA stated that Savala was never on staff with Chi Alpha and took steps to sever ties when it learned of his sex offender status; whistleblowers reportedly disputed the claims. Following Savala's arrest in June, an Alaskan minister linked to Chi Alpha was also charged with sexual abuse.

By August 2023, three Assemblies of God pastors from Texas and Louisiana had called for the resignation of the denomination's leaders over the Savala scandal. A pastor from Orange, Texas criticized his denomination's general superintendent, Doug E. Clay, and alleging minimization of the abuse Savala has been accused of. According to Clay, "Along the spectrum of ministry lines, there are times when there are hiccups, there are times when there are shortcomings, there are times when there are failures. But the failures of some individuals never trumps the strength and purpose and vitality of the particular ministry". An Orange, Texas-pastor, J. R. Armstrong responded, "Hundreds of victims of sexual abuse is not a spot on a spectrum."

In October 2023, it was revealed from a 1989 yearbook for the University of Louisiana at Lafayette, that Savala was mentioned as a Chi Alpha staff member alongside campus minister Eric Treuil. Treuil reestablished the local Chi Alpha chapter for the university in 1987, and since 1994, has led the Cajuns 4 Christ athletic outreach program. Previously, in 2012, former Louisiana Ragin' Cajun football players were arrested for sexual assault allegations. Following, some members of the Louisiana Ragin' Cajuns sought baptism through Chi Alpha and Treuil responded:

I believe it played a bit into it, from the angle of the reality that anybody can get into trouble—easily. And less you make some choices and decisions, it's easy for anybody to mess up. I do think it played a part. They stepped over and decided to make some good, strong decisions. It's saying, ‘Hey, I'm telling everybody I'm living out the Christian life. Now, they've put themselves out there for some accountability.

In November 2023, national director Scott Martin resigned, and the Assemblies of God withheld comment from The Christian Post, referencing its statement on the Savala scandal. As of 2025, Martin served as a missionary to Iceland. In January 2024, additional allegations were presented from an unnamed minor in Texas in a lawsuit set by their father against the Assemblies of God. By March 2024, a church disaffiliated from Assemblies of God USA over the Chi Alpha sex abuse scandal. By May 2024, three men linked with Chi Alpha's Texas A&M chapter were arrested for indecency with a child.

In August 2024, the suspended Texas A&M chapter was highlighted for recruiting during its suspension.

== Notable members ==
Following is a list of some of Chi Alpha's notable alumni.

- Kris Allen, the 2009 American Idol winner, was a member of Chi Alpha when he was a student at University of Central Arkansas in Conway, Arkansas.
- Jay Huff, professional basketball player with the Houston Rockets
- Carson Wentz, professional football players for Washington Commanders

== See also ==
- Baptist Collegiate Network
- Christian fraternities
- Christian sororities
