= WQFL (FM) =

- Rockford, Illinois; United States
- Broadcast area: Rockford and Vicinity
- Frequency: 100.9 MHz

Programming
- Format: Christian Worship
- Network: Air1

Ownership
- Owner: Educational Media Foundation
- Sister stations: WILV

History
- First air date: May 2, 1974
- Call sign meaning: "Quest For Life"

Technical information
- Licensing authority: FCC
- Class: A
- ERP: 2,700 watts
- HAAT: 149 meters (489 ft)
- Transmitter coordinates: 42.3222°N 89.0115°W
- Translator: (105.3 MHz) W287AU (Dekalb)

Links
- Public license information: Public file; LMS
- Webcast: Listen live
- Website: air1.com

WQFL (100.9 FM) is a radio station broadcasting a Christian Worship format as an affiliate of Air1. Licensed to Rockford, Illinois, the station is currently owned by Educational Media Foundation.

== History ==
The station began broadcasting May 2, 1974, and was owned by Open Bible Church, which was pastored by Pastor Don and Donna Lyons. In 1979, the station was sold to Rockford First Assembly of God, which operated it through its subsidiary Quest For Life, Inc. The station would later air a Christian Contemporary format as "Positive Hit Radio 101QFL". In 2009, the station was sold to Educational Media Foundation, along with 91.1 WGSL, for $2 million.
