= WILV =

Coordinates: 42°19′20.1″N 89°0′41.4″W

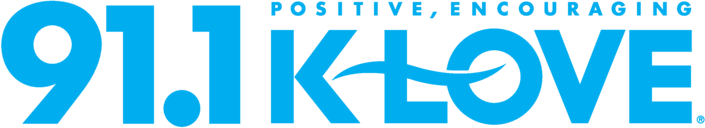
- Loves Park, Illinois; United States
- Broadcast area: Rockford, Illinois; Janesville, Wisconsin; Beloit, Wisconsin
- Frequency: 91.1 MHz
- Branding: K-Love

Programming
- Format: Christian contemporary
- Network: K-Love

Ownership
- Owner: Educational Media Foundation
- Sister stations: WQFL

History
- First air date: March 28, 1988
- Former call signs: WGSL (1987–2015)

Technical information
- Licensing authority: FCC
- Facility ID: 11064
- Class: B1
- ERP: 7,000 watts
- HAAT: 161 meters (528 ft)

Links
- Public license information: Public file; LMS
- Webcast: Listen live
- Website: www.klove.com

WILV (91.1 FM) is a radio station broadcasting a Christian contemporary format as an affiliate of K-Love. Licensed to Loves Park, Illinois, and serving the Rockford area, the station is owned by Educational Media Foundation.

== History ==
WILV began broadcasting as WGSL on March 28, 1988. The station was owned by Rockford First Assembly of God and aired a Christian format branded "Radio 91", with the slogan "Your Home for Life". The station aired Christian talk and teaching programs such as In Touch with Dr. Charles Stanley, Back to the Bible, Focus on the Family, and Grace to You with John MacArthur, as well as Christian music and Pacific Garden Mission's Christian radio drama Unshackled!. In 2009, the station was sold to Educational Media Foundation, along with 100.9 WQFL, for $2 million.
