= The Church at BattleCreek =

Coordinates: 36°05′05″N 95°48′46″W

BattleCreek Church is the name of a Southern Baptist, multi-campus church located in Broken Arrow, Oklahoma.

== History ==
Gracemont Baptist Church purchased an outlet Mall in 1991. In 2002, approximately 100 remaining members of Gracemont Baptist Church in Broken Arrow, Oklahoma, a suburb of Tulsa, asked Alex Himaya agreed to accept a position as Senior Pastor to help revitalize the church.

The church grew into a mega-church with six campuses before incorporating as The Church at BattleCreek, holding its initial public service on August 14, 2003. As of the church's third anniversary in August 2006, it was reporting weekly attendance at two Sunday morning services of over 1600 people, including over 700 children and teenagers. The church had also retired its mortgage debt and the staff of the church had expanded to include five full-time pastors, and several other full and part-time employees. Additionally, The Church at BattleCreek was operating a daily preschool and providing meeting space and financial support to Christian congregations for Arabic and Spanish speaking people in the Tulsa Metropolitan Area.

In 2007, the church began construction of a 1,200-seat auditorium with state-of-the-art audio-visual capabilities.

In 2014, Immanuel Baptist Church, located at the eastern edge of downtown Tulsa, joined the Church at Battle Creek as a satellite congregation. With the addition, the church had four sites, three in the Tulsa area and one in Wheaton, Illinois.

== Affiliation ==
The Church at BattleCreek is part of the Southern Baptist Convention, with a non-denominational approach that does not necessarily emphasize its Baptist affiliation.
