= Ralph M. Riggs =

Ralph Meredith Riggs (16 June 1895 – 13 January 1971) was the 8th General Superintendent of the Assemblies of God (1953–1959). Riggs was also a teacher at Bethany Bible College in Santa Cruz, California in the mid-1960s Books by Ralph M. Riggs. Living in Christ: Our Identification with Him', So Send I You: A study in Personal Soul Winning', 'The Spirit Himself.

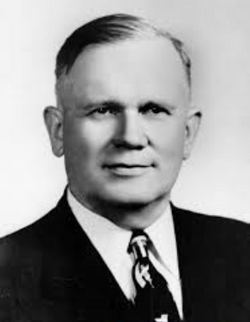
Ralph Riggs

== Early life and ministry ==
Riggs was born in Coal Creek, Tennessee. He converted to Christianity at the age of 10 and was baptized at 14. In 1914, he attended the first General Council of the Assemblies of God in Hot Springs, Arkansas. In 1916, he graduated from the Rochester Bible Training School and was ordained a minister. He pastored a church in nearby Syracuse, New York.
