= City First Church =

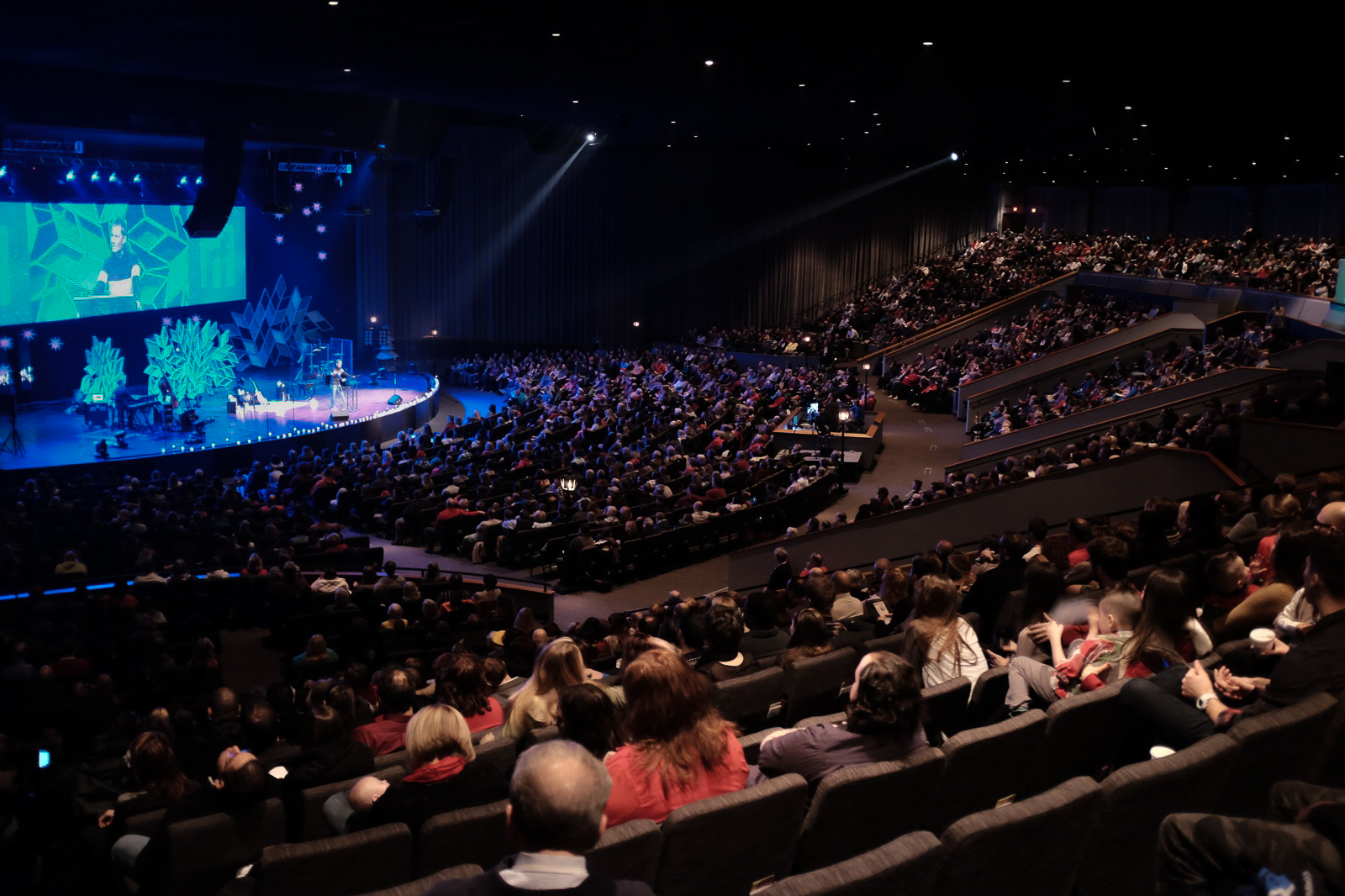
- Worship in 2015
- City First Church
- 42.2986°N 89.0005°W
- Location: Rockford, Illinois
- Country: United States
- Denomination: Pentecostal
- Website: cityfirst.church

History
- Founded: 1929

Specifications
- Capacity: 3,650
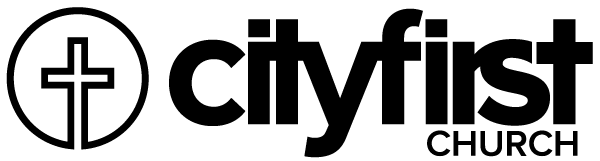

City First Church (formerly Rockford First) is a Pentecostal megachurch based out of Rockford, Illinois with multisite locations in FL and WI. It is affiliated with the Assemblies of God USA. The senior pastor is Jeremy DeWeerdt.

== History ==
City First Church was originally a small Swedish assembly that began meeting in a storefront hall on 5th Avenue in downtown Rockford in 1929.

In 1934, the name "First Assembly" is adopted during the pastoral ministry of Pastor Carl O'Guin. City First is a part of the Assemblies of God. Their claimed mission is four-fold; to evangelize the lost, worship God, disciple believers and to show compassion for others.

On September 12, 1971 a new location opened for First Assembly with a seating capacity of 1,200, at the corner of Spring Creek and Mulford Rds. First Assembly of God, under Pastor Eugene Whitcomb, opened Christian Life Elementary School in 1973. In the fall of 1974, Pastor Whitcomb and 5 other church-members were flying home from So. Dakota when the twin engine plane crashed over Albert Lea, Minnesota. Pastor Ernest Moen of 1st Assm. of God in Phoenix, AZ was called to officiate at the funeral and he later became the new Pastor with a 99% vote.

In 1975 Christian Life High School opened. Then in 1979, WQFL 100.9 FM radio was purchased from Open Bible Church. (Rev. Don Lyon) In 1981, Christian Life Retirement Center was opened on N. Mulford near the church. The Church also owned and operated WGSL (now WILV) 91.1 FM radio beginning in 1988. Both WQFL and WGSL were sold to Educational Media Foundation in 2009.

In 1986, the church begin the construction of a new building with a seating capacity of 3,650 persons. In 1993, Pastor Jeannie Mayo and Jeremy DeWeerdt launched the post high school group called Rockford Masters' Commission, which is now called City First Leadership College.

In April of 2007, Dr. Jeremy DeWeerdt and his wife Jen, accepted the Senior Pastor position, after having been on staff at City First Church for more than 16 years in the role of Student Ministries Pastor and Director/Founder of the post-high school ministry, Rockford Master’s Commission (currently named City First Leadership College).

In December 2010, Rockford First was listed number 51 in the 100 largest Assemblies of God churches in the United States.

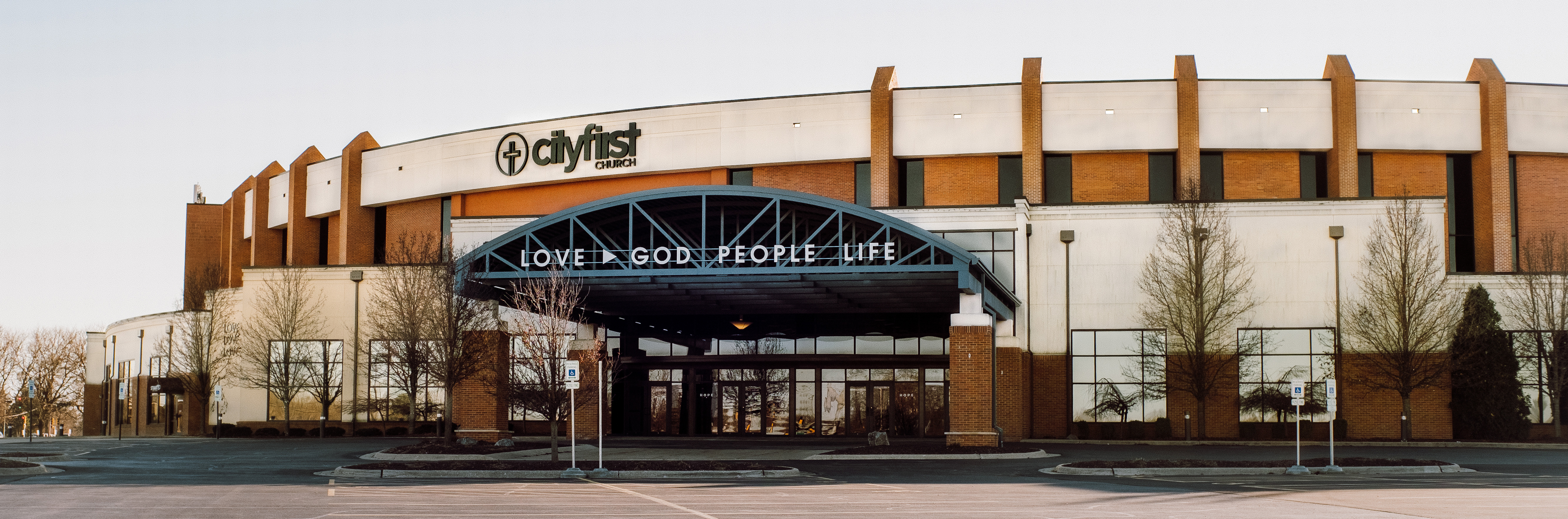
Building in Rockford

In September 2012, Outreach Magazine named Rockford First the 7th fastest growing church in the nation, with a 60% increase in weekly attendance between February 2011 – 2012.

In 2016, the attendance was 5,000 persons.

On January 29, 2017, Rockford First officially changed its name to City First Church. City First Church now has multiple locations, including Cape Coral, Florida, "God Behind Bars", and Janesville, WI.

== Beliefs ==
City First Church is part of the Assemblies of God USA.
