= Convoy of Hope =

American nonprofit organization

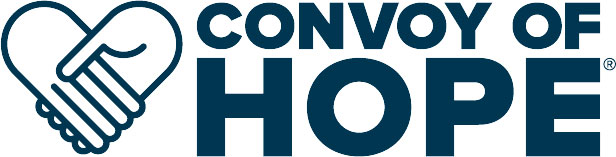
- Formation: 1994
- Founder: Hal (CEO), Steve, and Dave Donaldson
- Founded at: Sacramento, California
- Type: 501(c)(3) Nonprofit
- Location: Springfield, Missouri
- Region served: Worldwide
- Website: convoyofhope.org

Convoy of Hope is an American faith-based non-profit humanitarian and disaster relief organization that provides food, supplies, and humanitarian services to impoverished or otherwise needy populations throughout the world.

== History ==
Convoy of Hope was founded as a nonprofit organization in Sacramento, California, in 1994 by Hal, Steve, and Dave Donaldson. In 1996, Hal Donaldson was offered a job in Springfield, Missouri and moved Convoy of Hope's headquarters there as well.

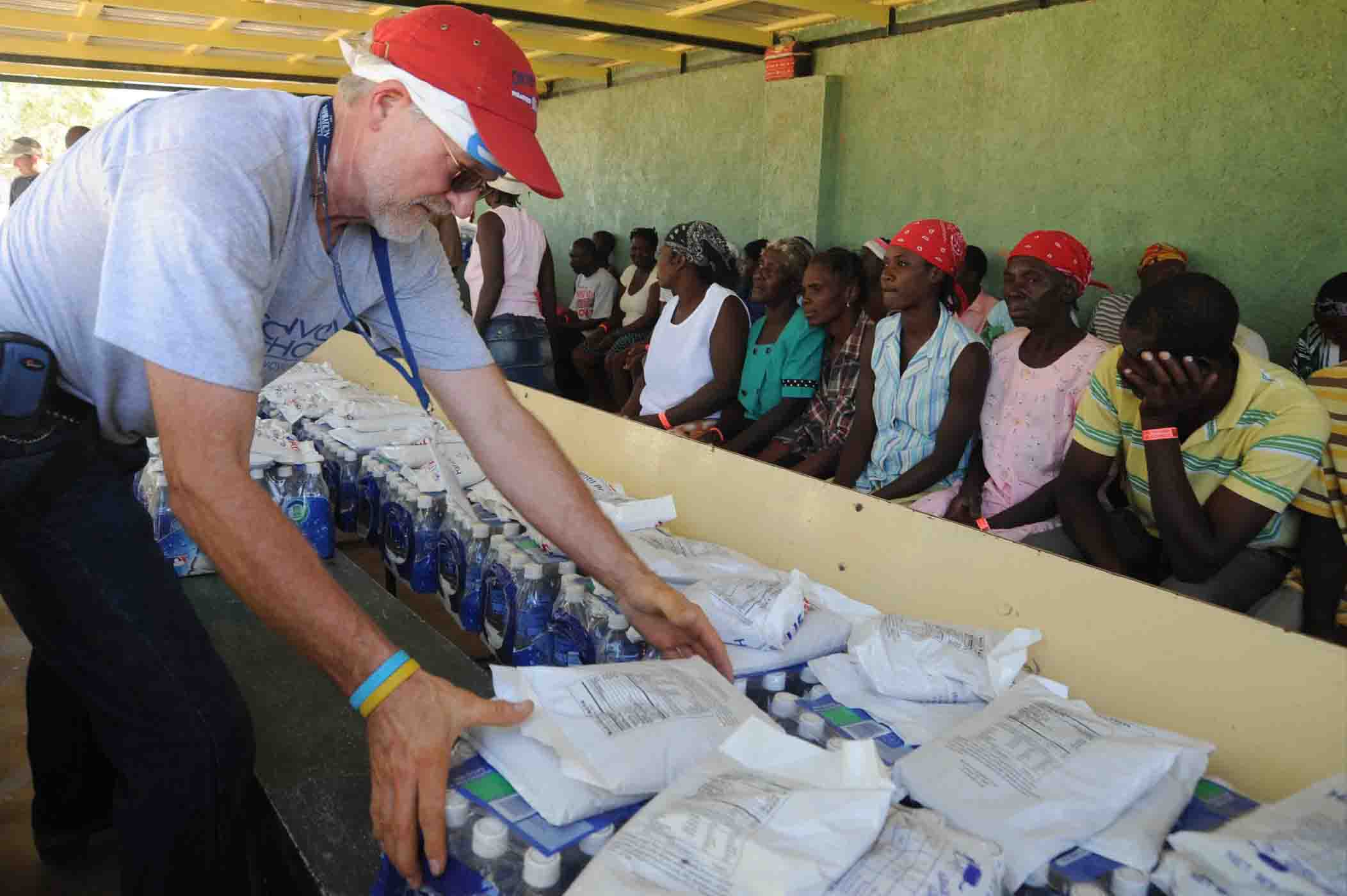
Convoy of Hope Volunteer helps distribute food at a Mission of Hope complex in Source Matelas, Haiti January 22, 2010.

Soon after the organization's arrival in Springfield, a local businessman donated a semi-truck and paid for a driver and fuel for one year. Fundraisers organized by the Assemblies of God helped bring in more trucks after that. In 2000, the organization purchased a 300,000 square-foot warehouse in Springfield to store its food and supplies. In 2005, Convoy of Hope provided $35 million (the equivalent of 700 truckloads) in goods for disaster relief in the aftermath of Hurricane Katrina. In 2006, the nonprofit provided access to food, medical assistance, clothing, and other services and resources to just under 4 million people. The following year, it began collaborating with the United States Agency for International Development (USAID) to offer meals to 12,000 children in Kenya, Haiti, Nicaragua, and El Salvador on a daily basis. In 2011, the Jonas Brothers donated $70,000 to Convoy of Hope to help fund the organization's children's feeding programs, which had expanded to Honduras and the Philippines. The musical group had previously donated $80,000 to fund Convoy of Hope's relief efforts after the 2010 Haiti earthquake.

In 2012, the organization provided aid to the victims of Hurricane Sandy in the Northeastern United States and Typhoon Bopha in the Philippines. By 2014, 20 years after its founding, Convoy had provided services to a total 67 million people in over 100 countries.

In October 2019, Convoy of Hope was given a 4-star rating for the 16th year in a row by Charity Navigator, a charity assessment organization.

The company established its World Distribution Center in Springfield, Missouri, in 2021 and, in October 2023, opened its Global Headquarters and Training Center. Expansion continued with the addition of a food packaging facility, which is scheduled for completion in late 2025.

In August 2025, Convoy of Hope opened a 125,000-square-foot regional distribution center in Bartow County, to improve disaster response times across the region.

As of 2025, the organization has distributed $3.1 billion in food, water, and supplies, served more than 300 million people, and was the 27th-largest charity in the U.S., according to Forbes.

== Services ==
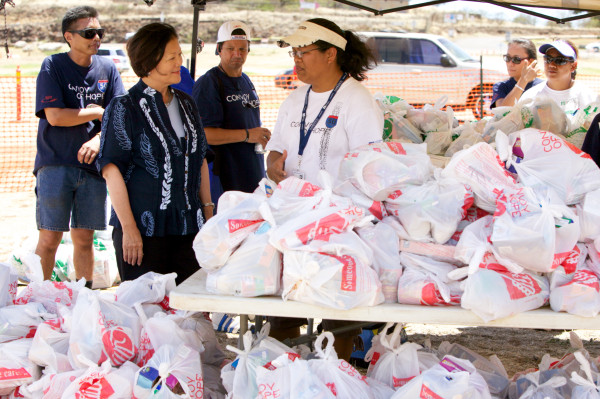
Senator Mazie Hirono with Convoy of Hope volunteers in Hawaii in 2012.

Convoy of Hope provides a variety of services to communities throughout the world. One of its primary functions is as a first responder organization in the wake of disasters. It maintains a fleet of tractor-trailers and other vehicles that can be deployed throughout the United States from its warehouse in Springfield, Missouri. Other vehicles include a chainsaw trailer, mobile bunkhouses, and mobile bathrooms. The tractor trailers that arrive at disaster locations are designed to help Convoy of Hope workers "arrive self-sufficient and ready to provide aid." Convoy of Hope relies on donations, monetary contributions, and volunteer work to provide relief.

Convoy of Hope hosts large-scale Community Events, mostly in locations throughout the United States. Convoy of Hope's Community Events deliver food, goods, and services totaling around $1 million in value. Some of the services provided for free include haircuts, dental exams, and health screenings. The events also often feature children's activities and live entertainment. Most of the goods and services are donated and volunteered by members of local businesses, churches, government agencies, and other nonprofit organizations. In 2018, the organization hosted 61 of these one-day events throughout the United States.

In 2003, Convoy of Hope started their Rural Compassion Initiative, which partners with churches, organizations, and other community leaders to provide resources, supplies, and training to rural communities in need. In 2017, the organization worked with 1,200 churches through its Rural Compassion Initiative to deliver 91,000 pairs of shoes to children in rural areas. The program also provides items like food, backpacks, toys, and other supplies for churches, schools, agencies, and other organizations in rural areas.

Convoy of Hope operates a Women's Empowerment program that is designed to educate women and girls in vulnerable communities. It also provides entrepreneurial training and seed capital for women to start their own businesses. In 2024, the program empowered more than 61,000 women and girls worldwide.

Convoy of Hope also has a children's feeding program that provides meals to children every school day in developing countries throughout the world. In 2024, the program was feeding 639,000 children per day worldwide. The program was originally started in 2006 in collaboration with USAID.

One Day to Feed the World is a global feeding initiative organized by Convoy of Hope and supported by various churches across the United States. The campaign is aimed at addressing hunger and poverty worldwide. Congregations such as The Fields Church in Illinois participate in the initiative through annual fundraising efforts, including their Easter offering.

=== Recent activities ===
In May 2025, Convoy responded to tornadoes in St. Louis and Kentucky, serving more than 10,000 people and distributing more than 195,000 pounds of relief supplies.

In January 2025, Convoy of Hope partnered with BattleCreek Church in Broken Arrow, Oklahoma, to support a large-scale food distribution event that aimed to serve up to 500 families affected by food insecurity during the federal government shutdown.

In July 2025, Convoy of Hope responded to deadly flooding in Texas along the Guadalupe River, where flash flooding killed at least 24 people. In July 2025, Convoy of Hope held a Community Event in Macon, Georgia, providing more than 40,000 pounds of food, more than 1,200 pairs of shoes, and more than 2,000 backpacks and school supplies to families.

In November 2025, Convoy of Hope sent hygiene kits, food, water, and solar-powered generators from its Sacramento hub to assist communities in Jamaica affected by Hurricane Melissa, where more than 70% of the population experienced power outages. Later that month, the organization partnered with the City of St. Charles, Missouri, to deliver a 53-foot truck filled with non-perishable food to local food pantries, helping to alleviate increased demand caused by disruptions to SNAP benefits.

In July 2026, Convoy of Hope partnered with two New England ministries for an event at The Big E in West Springfield, Massachusetts, providing groceries, baby supplies, haircuts, and medical and dental services to families attending the event.

== Partnerships ==
The Home Depot Foundation has supported Convoy of Hope’s disaster relief efforts. In June 2011, following a tornado in Joplin, Missouri, the foundation donated tools and supplies to assist local residents. This donation was part of The Home Depot Foundation's $1 million commitment to immediate relief, recovery, and long-term rebuilding efforts in Joplin. Representatives from The Home Depot Foundation have participated in other disaster response initiatives, including the dedication of Convoy of Hope’s Southeast regional distribution center in 2025.

Bass Pro Shops, headquartered in Springfield, Missouri, has partnered with Convoy of Hope for over 20 years, supporting relief efforts for tornadoes, hurricanes, and wildfires. In 2019, following Hurricane Dorian in the Bahamas, Morris led a campaign that raised in excess of $4 million for hurricane relief, and hosted a "Christmas in the Bahamas" event for children and families affected by the disaster. During the COVID-19 pandemic, Bass Pro Shops announced plans to send 1 million face masks nationwide, and the company, along with sister retailer Cabela’s, partnered with Convoy of Hope to provide 6,000 face masks to healthcare workers at Sentara CarePlex in Virginia.

Other corporate partners include Culligan, Coca-Cola, and Hormel Foods, which provide food and supplies for the organization’s programs. In 2024, Coca-Cola partnered with Convoy of Hope to support Hurricane Helene relief, providing hygiene kits and cases of product to affected areas.
