= Thomas F. Zimmerman =

Thomas F. Zimmerman (March 6, 1912 – January 2, 1991) was the 9th General Superintendent of the Assemblies of God. He is the longest serving general superintendent.

== Early life and ministry ==
Zimmerman was born in Indianapolis, Indiana. Zimmerman began preaching while still in his teens and pastored a number of churches in the Midwest, he was ordained in 1935.
