= Doye Agama =

UK Christian leader

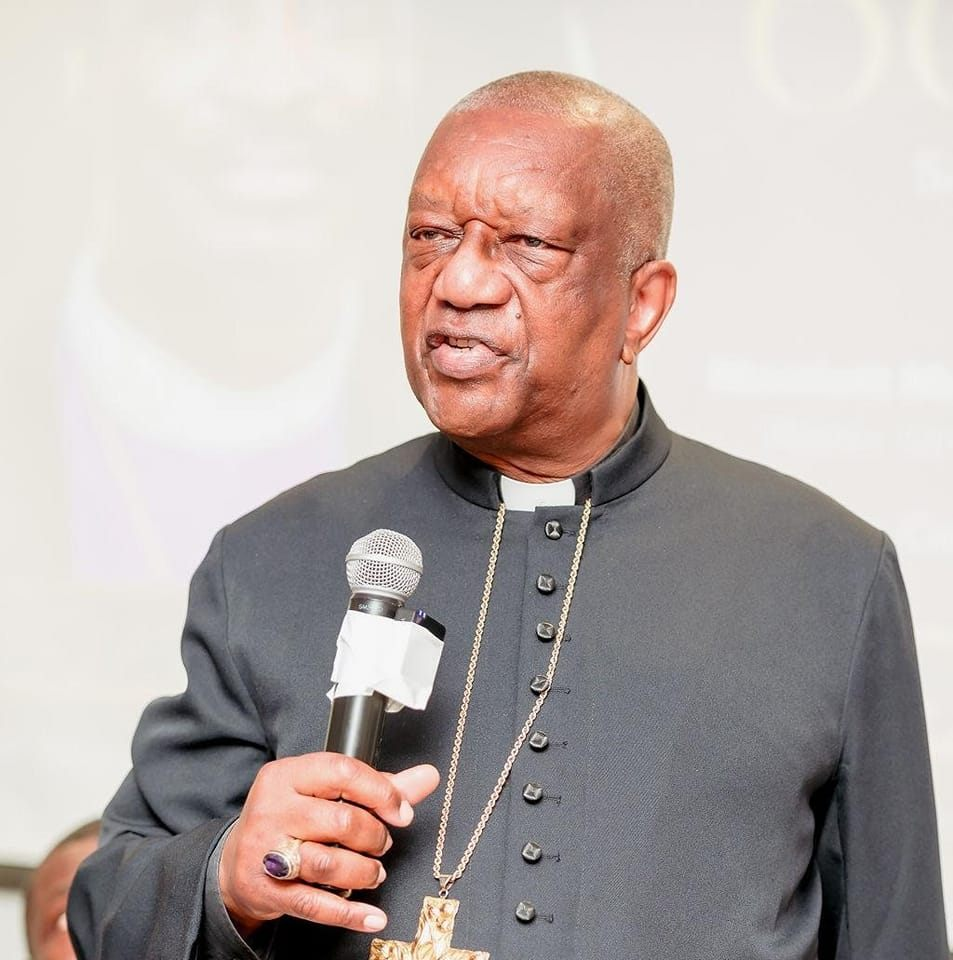
Archbishop Doye Agama

Archbishop Doyé Teido Agama is a Christian leader within the Pentecostal Holiness and Convergence movements. He is the founder of Apostolic Pastoral Congress, a collegiate collective of Pentecostal bishops and pastors adhering to paleo-orthodoxy and was for many years the organisation’s President and its presiding prelate. He leads the Christian Way of Life group of churches. He has been a prominent figure in the Churches Together in England movement and is involved extensively in the African diaspora and black and multicultural affairs.

Agama lives in the United Kingdom, but has close ties with Nigeria.

== Biography ==
Born in England in 1956 to Anglican parents of Nigerian origin, Agama was fostered early as a baby to a white family. In the early 1960s, he joined his natural family in Nigeria, remaining there until the mid 1970s.

Agama was ordained for Christian ministry in 1994, after a secular career in which he attained a range of management, consultancy and engineering skills and qualifications.

Agama was consecrated bishop in 2004, by Henry Paul Kontor, a Greek Orthodox (Old Calendar) bishop. (Note: In November 2003, Kontor was consecrated by Archbishop Maximos Valliantos of Athens, a Greek Orthodox (Old Calendar) prelate. Valliantos had become leader of the "Auxentian" Greek old calendarists in January 1995, in succession to Auxentios Pastras himself, Auxentios having died in 1994. Auxentios Pastras was leader of the "Florinite" Greek old calendarists from 1963 until deposed in 1986. The "Auxentian" old calendarists are the minority who remained loyal to Auxentios after he had been deposed by the majority.)

Agama's status as a bishop was reinforced in 2008 and 2010 as follows:

- In 2008, Agama and his wife Helen were accorded special laying-on of hands by the executive board of the Joint College of African-American Pentecostal Bishops, a college then led by the late Archbishop J. Delano Ellis.
- In January 2010, Agama was received into the House of Bishops of the Pentecostal Churches of Christ (USA), another organisation led by Ellis, and was duly granted apostolic succession.

Agama was elevated to the status of archbishop on 19 October 2013, at a ceremony held in Southwark Cathedral, London. Ellis provided a "Consecration Mandate" which was read during the ceremony. Ellis also sent an episcopal delegation from USA to London, England. The delegation consisted of Bishop Darryl Woodson (who presided at the ceremony as chief consecrator) and Bishop Benjamin Douglass (assisting), both of these being bishops among the Pentecostal Churches of Christ (USA). Bishop Duke Akamisoko of the Anglican Diocesan of Kubwa-Abuja in Nigeria also joined in laying hands on Agama. Akamisoko is bishop of the Kubwa diocese, within the province of Abuja, in the Church of Nigeria (Anglican Communion). Bishop David Chaney, leader of the Anglican Communion of Charismatic Churches also participated. The Archbishop of Canterbury was officially represented at the consecration event by Michael Ipgrave, (then Bishop of Woolwich), who also represented the Diocese of Southwark. Also present in the Anglican delegation was Nigel McCulloch, retired Bishop of Manchester.

Agama became a member of the board of directors/trustees of England's national ecumenical instrument, Churches Together in England, the moderator (2012-2015) of the Forum of Churches Together in England, a member of Churches Together in England's reference group for minority ethnic Christian affairs (MECA-CTE), and a co-president of "Greater Manchester Churches Together". He became abbot of the Order of St Hadrian of Canterbury, a chivalric order under the patronage of Prince Ermias Sahle-Selassie Haile-Selassie, and Goodluck Jonathan (a former President of Nigeria) of Nigeria and Bishop McCulloch among its members.

== Views ==
Agama has a particular interest in the Christian Church of the first millennium in the British Isles and in the early monastics such as those at Whithorn (Candida Casa) (St Ninian) in Galloway, Scotland, at Iona, at Lindisfarne, and the north African Coptic (Coptic Church) (Berber) scholar-monk St Hadrian of Canterbury. Agama wrote on how insights from the first millennium can help people in their personal devotion and prayer life in the 21st century.

Agama has said that recession is nothing new to the black community in the United Kingdom, and that the experience of the majority of the members of the black community over many years has been of hardship and exile. It has been said that, in the same way, Bob Marley and other black musicians and poets often sang and wrote of the experience of living in Babylon.

In May 2013, Agama was one of 53 faith leaders (Christian, Jewish, Muslim, Hindu and Buddhist) who signed an open letter to the UK prime minister calling for a rethink of the then proposed same-sex marriage legislation for England and Wales. The signatories included a Church of England diocesan bishop Mike Hill and three Roman Catholic archbishops. The letter accused the prime minister of rushing the legislation through Parliament without proper scrutiny, and predicted that the Parliamentary Bill would, if enacted, result in serious and harmful consequences for the health of society, for family life, and for human rights such as freedom of religion and of speech.

== Apostolic succession ==
Through its founder, Agama, the Apostolic Pastoral Congress lays claim to a measure of apostolic succession. The Apostolic Pastoral Congress does not consider apostolic succession a requisite for salvation, but does consider it a privilege to be in the chain of historical succession.

Many lines of apostolic succession converge in Agama. The lines cited in the Apostolic Pastoral Congress's 2013 ordinal booklet are as follows:

- through Greek Orthodox tradition (Old Calendar), via Metropolitan Henry Paul Kontor.
- from the Patriarchy of the East through the Syro-Chaldean Archidiocese of North America (renamed in 1992 as the Evangelical Apostolic Church of North America). (Note: The line of succession from Maran Mar Shimun XVIII Rubil to Agama is as follows: On 17 December 1862, Shimun XVIII consecrated Anthony Thondanatt (Mar Abdisho Antonius).; On 24 July 1899, Thondanatt consecrated Luis Mariano Soares (Mar Basilius).; On 30 November 1902, Soares consecrated Ulric Vernon Herford (Mar Jacobus).; On 2 February 1925, Herford consecrated William Stanley McBean Knight (Mar Paulos).; On 30 October 1931, Knight consecrated Dr Hedley Coward Bartlett (Mar Hedley).; On 20 May 1945, Bartlett consecrated Hugh George de Willmott Newman (Mar Georgius).; On 13 April 1952, Newman consecrated Charles Dennis Boltwood.; On 3 May 1959, Boltwood consecrated John Marion Stanley (Mar Yokhannan).; On 31 October 1976, Stanley was a co-consecrator of Bertram Schlossberg (Mar Uzziah Bar Evyon).; In 1995, Schlossberg's jurisdiction entered into collegial fellowship with Ellis and with the jurisdiction led by Ellis (then called United Pentecostal Churches of Christ). Robert Woodward Burgess (a bishop consecrated by Schlossberg, and acting under authority of a mandate issued by Schlossberg) imparted the Schlossberg-Burgess succession to the bishops of the United Pentecostal Churches of Christ, the organization from which Pentecostal Churches of Christ has emerged. Further, on 5 March 1969, Stanley received Bishop James Andrew Gaines (Mar Jacobus) into his jurisdiction. Archbishop Stanley subsequently elevated Gaines to archbishop. Gaines was chief consecrator on 31 October 1976 when (as stated above) Stanley assisted as consecrator at Schlossberg's consecration.; In 2010, Agama was received into the House of Bishops of Pentecostal Churches of Christ and was granted apostolic succession in that House. This was further reinforced on 19 October 2013 at the ceremony of elevation to archbishop in that two Pentecostal Churches of Christ bishops (Bishops Woodson and Douglass) participated as co-consecrators and they were acting under a mandate issued by Ellis.)
- through Wesleyan/Methodist tradition, via John Wesley, Thomas Coke (1747–1814) and Francis Asbury (1745–1816) and two hundred years of Methodism in USA to Carl Edwards Williams and Reuben Timothy Jones who on 17 April 1970 consecrated Ellis and thereby passed on their succession to the House of Bishops of the Pentecostal Churches of Christ. Williams and Jones were bishops of the Church of God in Christ. Both of them were possessors of Holy Orders from the Methodist Episcopal Church USA, Jones having been ordained by Bishop Frederick Pierce Corson, president of the World Methodist Conference. (Note: The question as to whether the succession through Wesley, Coke and Asbury is an episcopal succession is a moot point. Wesley was a Church of England clergyman, but he was not a Church of England bishop. Many hold that Wesley was secretly consecrated a bishop in 1763 by Erasmus of Arcadia when Erasmus was visiting London but that Wesley could not openly announce his episcopal consecration owing to the Praemunire Act of 1393. Erasmus was the Greek Orthodox bishop of Arcadia in Crete, a jurisdiction under the patriarch of Smyrna. In 1784, Wesley ordained Coke as superintendent of the Methodists in the United States. Coke, however, was already an ordained Church of England clergyman prior to this ceremony. For more information, see wikipage on John Wesley.) (Note: Delano, Ellis, J. (2003). The Bishopric - A handbook on creating episcopacy in the African-American Pentecostal church. Victoria, BC: Trafford. ISBN 1-55395-848-9. does not indicate that Bishops Williams and Jones carried succession as bishops from the Methodist Episcopal Church. Ellis states simply that Williams and Jones were Church of God in Christ bishops and that they possessed "Holy Orders" from the Methodist Episcopal Church.)

There are other lines or streams of succession in addition to those that are mentioned in the Congress's 2013 ordinal booklet. For example:

- Russian/Ukrainian Orthodox lines also converge in Agama from James Andrew Gaines who (in 1965) had been consecrated in that tradition.
- Also, there is a line of succession from Archbishop Makarios III, patriarch of the Church of Cyprus. (Note: The Church of Cyprus is an autocephalous Greek church within the Orthodox tradition, part of the Eastern Orthodox Church and in full communion with the Ecumenical Patriarch of Constantinople. The line of succession from Makarios III to Agama is as follows: Makarios III consecrated Theoklitos Kantaris (Greek Orthodox archdiocese of New York (Old Calendar)).; On 30 March 1965, Kantaris elevated Walter Myron Propheta to the status of archbishop.; On 30 May 1965, Propheta consecrated James Andrew Gaines (Mar Jacobus).; On 31 October 1976, Gaines was a co-consecrator of Bertram Schlossberg (Mar Uzziah Ben Evyon).; The succession from Gaines and Schlossberg (via Ellis and the Pentecostal Churches of Christ (USA)) is recounted in an earlier Note in this article.)
- A Slavonic Orthodox line of succession comes in via William Andrew Prazsky and Anthony Prazsky who, in 1976, participated as co-consecrators in Schlossberg's consecration. (Note: This Slavonic succession comes via Gregorious IV (Haddad)(reigned 1906-1928), Melkite Greek Catholic patriarch, as follows: In 1913, Gregorious IV consecrated Metropolitan Archbishop Dionisiy Valedynsky.; In 1932, Valedynsky consecrated Metropolitan Archbishop Polikarp Sikorsky.; In 1942, Sikorsky consecrated Metropolitan Archbishop Nikanor Abramovich.; In 1942, Abramovich consecrated Metropolitan Archbishop Hryhoriy Ohiychuk (metropolitan archbishop of the Patriarchal Throne of Kiev and All Russia-Ukraine in Exile).; In 1969, Ohiychuk consecrated Walter Andrew Prazsky and Anthony Prazsky.)
- A line of succession from Gerardus Gul of the Old Catholic Union of Utrecht comes in via the Catholic Mariavite Church and Newman. (Note: Gul → Maria Michał Kowalski → Marie Marc Fatôme → Marie Paulus Maas → Fusi → Marchese → Newman.) There is a second or parallel path from Gul to Newman, via Arnold Harris Mathew, though some question the validity of that path. (Note: The validity of the Gul → Mathew sequence is a moot point. Gul consecrated Mathew in April 1908 based on fictitious documentation provided to the International Old Catholic Bishops' Conference (IBC) of the Union of Utrecht of the Old Catholic Churches (UU) about non-existent congregations electing Mathew. The IBC bishops voted to include the fictitiously documented congregations (which did not exist) into the UU as a new member church and consecrate Mathew as bishop of that new member church. A consecration ritual did occur in April 1908, but was later declared invalid by the IBC. The IBC did not have adequate evidence of Mathew's culpability in 1908 and he remained an IBC bishop until December 1910 when De Oud-Katholiek concluded that Mathew had "given up communion with the other Old Catholics" when he acted against the Convention of Utrecht by performing secret consecrations of men who belonged to another church and ignored "his duty to inform" the IBC prior to "any consecration" so "that the case may be duly examined" by the IBC. A 1913 jury for the Mathew v. "The Times" Publishing Co., Ltd. trial found that "the words were true in substance and in fact" that Mathew was a "pseudo-bishop." Years after he was declared a "pseudo-bishop" and only months after Mathew and Gul had both died, the IBC declared in April 1920 that Mathew's election was presented in bad faith to the IBC prior to the consecration ritual in 1908 and was annulled as invalid.) (Note: The Gul → Kowalski sequence of apostolic succession is independent of the Gul → Mathew sequence.)
- There is a line of succession via Newman from Church of England archbishops of Canterbury (and therefore stretching back in English history at least as far back as St Augustine of Canterbury (who arrived at Canterbury in 597). The line from archbishops of Canterbury flows via Scottish bishops and then North American bishops and bishops of the Reformed Episcopal Church in North America. (Note: .)

Numerous lines or streams of succession converge in Newman, thus forming what is, in effect, an ecumenical apostolic succession.

== Publications ==
- Agama, DT Ancient Prayers For Today, 2011 Chakram Ltd, Manchester, England ISBN 978-0-9568126-0-5
- Agama, DT A Word For Your Now, 2012 Chakam Publishing, Manchester, England (a booklet of 70 small pages) ISBN 978-0-9568126-1-2
- Agama, Doyé (2015). An apostolic handbook. Volume one, Guidance on faith and order in the Apostolic Pastoral Congress. Peterborough, GB: FastPrint. ISBN 9781784561987.
- Agama, DT An apostolic handbook. Volume two
- Agama, DT An apostolic handbook. Volume three, Ancient prayer secrets of the first apostles and the early church, 2015 Fastprint Publishing, Peterborough, England (a re-publication of Ancient Prayers For Today - see above) ISBN 978-178456-232-8
- Agama, DT Africa, Christianity and the Bible - Our Global Destiny, 2016 Fastprint Publishing, Peterborough, England ISBN 978-178456-312-7
- Agama, DT Strategic Leadership in the Charity Sector - a selection of perspectives, 2016 Fastprint Publishing, Peterborough, England ISBN 978-178456-335-6
