= Bishop Pearson =

Bishop Pearson may refer to:

- Carlton Pearson, an American Christian minister (born 1953)
- John Pearson (bishop), an English theologian and scholar (1613 – 1686)
