= Joint College of African-American Pentecostal Bishops =

Christian organization in Texas, US

- Seal of the Joint College
- Abbreviation: JCAAPB; JCOB
- Formation: 1993
- Type: Religious organization
- Legal status: Civil nonprofit
- Purpose: Education
- Headquarters: Windcrest, Texas
- Official language: English
- Chairman: Archbishop David M. Copeland
- Main organ: Board of Directors
- Affiliations: Pentecostalism; Oneness Pentecostalism
- Website: collegeofbishops.org

The Joint College of African-American Pentecostal Bishops (JCAAPB), more commonly known as the Joint College of Bishops (JCOB) or simply the Joint College, is a Christian organization founded in 1993. Established by bishops J. Delano Ellis, Wilbert Sterling McKinley, Roy Edward Brown, and Paul Sylvester Morton to train Pentecostal and Charismatic bishops and bishops-elect; and to introduce liturgical order and identity into African-American Pentecostalism; the organization is currently chaired by Archbishop David M. Copeland.

From the inception of the Joint College of African-American Pentecostal Bishops, its co-founders have been labeled as "leaders in the shift" among African American Pentecostals for introducing liturgical order and identity among Pentecostal or Full Gospel churches and denominations. The organization also introduced the doctrine of apostolic succession to many Pentecostal and Charismatic bishops and bishops-elect, and its members claim to be in historic apostolic succession through lines which have been denied and repudiated from their origins.

== History ==
The Joint College of African-American Pentecostal Bishops was established in November 1993, by J. Delano Ellis, Wilbert Sterling McKinley, Roy E. Brown, and Paul S. Morton. From its inception, Ellis, primate of the United Pentecostal Churches of Christ (presently the United Covenant Churches of Christ and Pentecostal Churches of Christ), was elected as the organization's chairman.

In 2003, Ellis published The Bishopric – A Handbook on Creating Episcopacy in the African-American Pentecostal Church, for Pentecostal prelates. Through this book, Ellis and JCOB introduced apostolic succession to many within the African-American Christian tradition, and the college reappropriated the history and purpose of vestments and the episcopacy for their Protestant traditions in contrast with their initial users in Catholicism and Anglicanism.

Redefining the episcopacy for African-American Pentecostals in particular, Ellis and the college taught the chimere was a prophetic garment; in contrast, the chimere was originally part of academic dress before adoption by Anglican or Episcopalian bishops. Ellis and the Joint College also taught the fascia was the "towel used to wash His [Jesus] disciples feet," though it was worn by all Catholic clergy since 1624, and symbolizes chastity. Leaders within the Joint College of Bishops even promoted the five-fold ministry of the Apostolic-Prophetic movement, and the ordination of women.

Between 2004-2005, when Bishop Carlton D. Pearson advocated for Christian universalism, Ellis and the college's board denounced Pearson as a heretic.

In 2012, the organization admitted and certified a gay bishop, O.C. Allen of the Vision Church of Atlanta, though Ellis and the board later denounced the ordination of homosexuals.

Following the death of J. Delano Ellis in September 2020, David M. Copeland succeeded as the organization's chairman as of 2025. On March 18, 2026, Copeland was enthroned as the metropolitan of the Joint College of Bishops by the board of directors including Listen Page II and Archbishop Emilio Alvarez Jr.

== Doctrine ==
The Joint College of Bishops rejects Christian universalism and the ordination of homosexuals. The college also teaches apostolic succession, though their claims have been repudiated.

=== Apostolic succession ===
==== J. Delano Ellis' claims ====
Apostolic succession was introduced to African-American Protestant leaders in Ellis' book, The Bishopric – A Handbook on Creating Episcopacy in the African-American Pentecostal Church. Through the third chapter of this book, Ellis and the Joint College of African-American Pentecostal Bishops taught:

No person should have the right to exercise or conduct themselves in any of the Episcopal Matters of our Churches without Apostolic Succession, and Episcopal Dispensation to do so. We believe that bishops are the direct descendants of the Lord Jesus Christ, through His Apostles. Because of that contention, we hold dear our Apostolic Succession which we claim through Augustine of Rome, who was sent by the 'Holy See' to England to establish the English Church. Aside from Succession through the Western Stream, this College also holds this same Succession through the Syrian Orthodox stream. [Please refer to the Historical Documents on Apostolic Succession in the APPENDIX of this Book.] The forgoing statement is not to suggest that we do not recognize any other God-appointed leaders and episcopates of other Christian Reformations and Communions. We only intend to contend for our own heritage within the ancient pilgrim Church family.

— J. Delano Ellis, The Bishopric – A Handbook on Creating Episcopacy in the African-American Pentecostal Church, Chapter III: Apostolic Succession

Ellis claimed "western and eastern streams of apostolic succession." He claimed "western streams of succession" via the Church of England, John Wesley, Thomas Coke, Francis Asbury, the Methodist Episcopal Church and the Church of God in Christ. The claimed succession from the Methodist Episcopal Church is stated as being via three Church of God in Christ bishops (David Charles Williams, Carl Edward Williams and Reuben Timothy Jones), all of whom held holy orders from the Methodist Episcopal Church. In his book, he made no claim or comment at all as to whether the line of succession via Wesley, Coke, Asbury and the Methodist Episcopal Church carries unbroken apostolic succession as distinct from presbyteral succession only. He also didn't indicate that Williams, Williams and Jones possessed episcopal consecration from the Methodist Episcopal Church, nor does he cite any episcopal apostolic lineage for their status as bishops of the Church of God in Christ. Additionally, Wesley was an Anglican priest, but he was not an Anglican bishop. Some believe that Wesley was secretly elevated as bishop by Greek Orthodox bishop Erasmus of Arcadia in 1763. Others believe Wesley's stance that apostolic succession could be transmitted through presbyters, and that he was a scriptural episkopos.

Ellis also noted that in 1964 he had been ordained presbyter by Bishop Ozro Thurston Jones of the Church of God in Christ, and he notes his episcopal consecration in 1970 by Bishop Brumfield Johnson of the Mount Calvary Holy Church of America. His book cited no episcopal apostolic lineage for this 1970 consecration either.

"Eastern streams of succession" were traced by Ellis from the Syro-Chaldean Church in the East, via Archbishop Bertram S. Schlossberg (Mar Uzziah), Archbishop-Metropolitan of the Syro-Chaldean Church of North America, also known as the Evangelical Apostolic Church of North America; in 1995, Ellis claimed that the Evangelical Apostolic Church of North America entered into collegial fellowship with the United Pentecostal Churches of Christ. At a holy convocation of the United Pentecostal Churches of Christ, Bishop Robert Woodward Burgess II (representing Archbishop Schlossberg, who was living in Jerusalem) was claimed to have assisted at the elevation of a number of additional bishops. Burgess had denied assisting or performing any acts, and his diocese issued a statement in 2026 repudiating and denouncing these claims.

According to Michael Ramsey—once the Archbishop of Canterbury (1961–1974)—the validity of someone's apostolic succession pertains to continuity of teaching, preaching, governing, ordination and grace. In Catholic theology, apostolic succession effects the power and authority to administer the sacraments except for baptism and matrimony; thus, apostolic succession is necessary for the valid celebration of the sacraments. Through the Anglican and Catholic understandings of holy orders and the sacramental character imprinted upon those ordained, and those who claim to be within an episcopal apostolic succession; Anglican and Catholic theologians historically reject Ellis and the Joint College's claims, as he converted to Oneness Pentecostalism, breaking theological continuity. In contrast, also with the early Church Fathers and Catholicism, which rejects women's ordination, Ellis and the college also affirmed the ordination of women.

==== Paul S. Morton's claims ====
Alongside Ellis, some members of the Joint College claimed apostolic succession through Paul S. Morton, founding bishop of the Full Gospel Baptist Church Fellowship. Morton claimed apostolic succession through one of his consecrators, Archbishop George Augustus Stallings of the African-American Catholic Congregation. Stallings assisted in the elevation of Morton to the episcopacy in March 1993, following his own 1990 elevation by American Independent Orthodox bishops upon his departure and excommunication from the Catholic Church. Though excommunicated, in light of his sacramental character and the doctrine of ex opere operato, all male ordinations performed by Stallings could be considered "valid but illicit" yet theological continuity via apostolic succession can be disputed for the variances of Baptist doctrine such as the lack of a sacrificial priesthood in Catholic theology; and for Stallings and the African-American Catholic Congregation's religious syncretism with traditional African religions. For these reasons, Stallings' episcopacy was repudiated by his chief consecrator in 1991.
