= Come Sunday (film) =

2018 film by Joshua Marston

- Poster
- Directed by: Joshua Marston
- Written by: Marcus Hinchey
- Based on: "Heretics" from This American Life by Russell Cobb
- Produced by: Ira Glass; Alissa Shipp; James D. Stern; Julie Goldstein
- Starring: Chiwetel Ejiofor; Jason Segel; Condola Rashad; Lakeith Stanfield; Stacey Sargeant; Vondie Curtis-Hall; Danny Glover; Martin Sheen
- Cinematography: Peter Flinckenberg
- Edited by: Malcolm Jamieson
- Music by: Tamar-kali
- Production companies: Apparatus Productions; Endgame Entertainment; This American Life
- Distributed by: Netflix
- Release dates: January 21, 2018 (Sundance); April 13, 2018 (United States)
- Running time: 106 minutes
- Country: United States
- Language: English

Come Sunday is a 2018 American drama film directed by Joshua Marston and written by Marcus Hinchey, based on "Heretics", a 2005 episode of the radio show This American Life. It stars Chiwetel Ejiofor as Carlton Pearson, an evangelist minister who was ostracized by his church and excommunicated for preaching that there is no Hell. Jason Segel, Condola Rashad, LaKeith Stanfield, Stacey Sargeant, Vondie Curtis-Hall, Danny Glover, and Martin Sheen also star.

The film had its world premiere at the 2018 Sundance Film Festival, and was released in the United States on April 13, 2018, by Netflix.

== Plot ==
Evangelist Carlton Pearson is ostracized by his church and excommunicated for preaching that there is no Hell. Pearson, played by Chiwetel Ejiofor, was a popular preacher known for his charismatic sermons and large congregation. However, his faith is shaken when he begins to question traditional Christian teachings, particularly the concept of hell. He starts to believe that a loving God would not condemn people to eternal damnation, even if they are non-believers. This new perspective, which he calls "The Gospel of Inclusion," leads him to preach that hell does not exist and that everyone is already saved through God's grace. His radical shift in theology causes controversy and alienates many in his congregation and the larger Christian community. The film follows Pearson's personal struggles as he faces rejection, both from his church and lifelong mentors, while standing firm in his new beliefs. The movie highlights themes of faith, doubt, and redemption, focusing on the cost of following one’s conscience against tradition.

== Cast ==
- Chiwetel Ejiofor as Carlton Pearson
- Martin Sheen as Oral Roberts
- Condola Rashad as Gina Pearson, Carlton's wife
- Jason Segel as Henry
- Danny Glover as Quincy Pearson, Carlton's imprisoned uncle
- Lakeith Stanfield as Reggie
- Allie McCulloch as Lawyer
- Joni Bovill as Yvette Flunder
- Stacey Sargeant as Nicky Brown
- Vondie Curtis-Hall as J. D. Ellis
- Dustin Lewis as Ron
- Ric Reitz as Richard Roberts
- Greg Lutz as Pat Robertson

== Production ==
In July 2010, it was announced Marc Forster would produce and possibly direct the film Heretics, written by Marcus Hinchey and based on the This American Life episode of the same name. James D. Stern was set to produce the film under his Endgame Entertainment banner, with Ira Glass also producing alongside Alissa Shipp under their This American Life banner. In May 2014, it was announced Robert Redford and Jeffrey Wright had been cast in the film, which had been retitled Come Sunday, while Jonathan Demme would direct, with Forster only serving as an executive producer. In July 2016, it was announced Joshua Marston would now direct the film, with Chiwetel Ejiofor joining the cast and Netflix distributing. In September 2016, Danny Glover joined the cast of the film. In December 2016, Condola Rashad, Lakeith Stanfield and Martin Sheen joined the cast of the film, with Sheen replacing Redford. In January 2017, Stacey Sargeant joined the cast of the film.

=== Filming ===
Principal photography began in January 2017.

== Release ==
The film had its world premiere at the Sundance Film Festival on January 21, 2018. It was released on April 13, 2018, on Netflix.

== Critical response ==
On Rotten Tomatoes, the film has an approval rating of 68% based on 34 reviews, with an average rating of 5.7/10. The website's critical consensus reads, "Come Sunday benefits greatly from Chiwetel Ejiofor's central performance, which is often enough to lift an otherwise uneven drama." On Metacritic, the film has a weighted average score of 65 out of 100, based on 14 critics, indicating "generally favorable" reviews.

David Rooney of The Hollywood Reporter wrote: "The movie's pounding heart is the remarkable Ejiofor. Imbuing his role with authority, charisma, mighty strength and wrenching human frailty, he's enough to make believers of all of us." Peter Debruge of Variety wrote: "Marston, working from Marcus Hinchey’s sensitive and remarkably nuanced script, invites measured introspection from both his characters and the audience."

== See also ==
- List of black films of the 2010s
