= United Holy Church of America =

African-American church

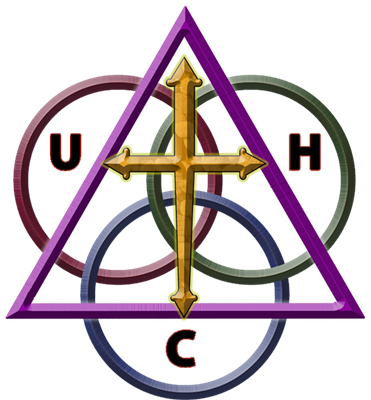
- Classification: Protestant
- Orientation: Holiness-Pentecostal
- Polity: Episcopal
- General Presiding Prelate: Gregory K. Hargrave
- General Vice President: Kenneth White
- General Second Vice President: J. Derrick Johnson
- Associations: Pentecostal/Charismatic Churches of North America
- Region: Worldwide
- Headquarters: Greensboro, North Carolina, U.S.
- Founder: Elder L.M. Mason
- Origin: 1886 (founded), 1918 (incorporated); Method, North Carolina
- Congregations: est. 516
- Members: 50,000+
- Official website: uhcainc.org

The United Holy Church of America (UHCA) is the oldest African-American Holiness-Pentecostal body in the world. It was established in 1886, with the general headquarters in Greensboro, North Carolina.

== Divisions and reunification ==
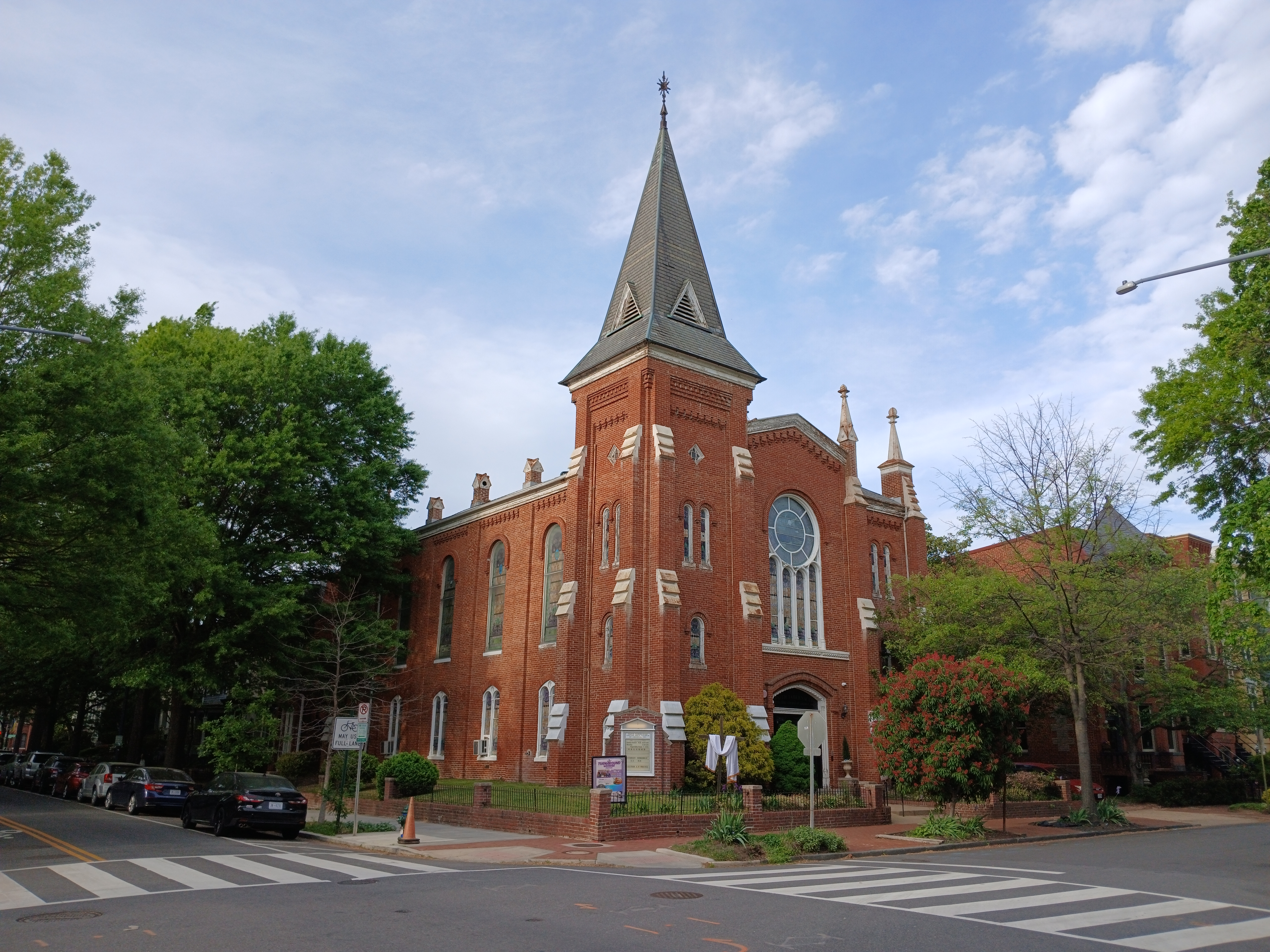
Faith Tabernacle United Holy Church of America, located in Capitol Hill, Washington, D.C., in April 2025

=== Mount Sinai Holy Church of America ===
In 1924, early member and pioneer of the Northern District, Elder Ida B. Robinson of Philadelphia, Pennsylvania felt that ministry opportunities for women in the UHCA were limited. After fasting and praying for ten days, she founded a new denomination, Mount Sinai Holy Church of America, where women could obtain full clergy rights. The establishment was of mutual agreement and many leaders of the UHCA attended their first convocation in 1925, where she was consecrated a bishop.

=== Mount Calvary Holy Church of America ===
In 1928, Elder Brumfield Johnson of Summit, New Jersey, was serving as a pastor of a local congregation of the Northern District, when he conducted a revival in Winston-Salem, North Carolina. Many of the new converts desired that he serve as their pastor. In 1929, after a conference he conducted in New Jersey, twenty ministers joined him and later that year he chartered the new denomination, Mount Calvary Holy Church of America.

=== Alpha and Omega Pentecostal Church of America, Incorporated ===
In 1945, Reverend Magdalene Mabe Philips, a former minister of the UHCA, formed the Alpha and Omega Pentecostal Church of America.

=== Southern District 1977 separation and reunification ===
On May 8, 2000, in the city of Greensboro, North Carolina, during the Quadrennial Session of the General Convocation, a Reunification Service was held with Bishop J. Delano Ellis presiding to celebrate this historic moment.
