= Mount Sinai Holy Church of America =

Pentecostalistic church in Pennsylvania, USA

- Classification: Protestant
- Orientation: Pentecostal
- Theology: Holiness Pentecostal
- Polity: Episcopal
- President: Presiding Bishop Grace R. Batten
- Associations: United Holy Church of America
- Headquarters: Mount Olive Holy Temple, Philadelphia, Pennsylvania
- Founder: Ida B. Robinson
- Origin: 1924
- Congregations: approximately 130
- Members: est. 50,000
- Official website: http://mtsinaiholychurch.org/home.html

The Mount Sinai Holy Church of America (MSHCA) is a Christian church in the Holiness-Pentecostal tradition. The church is episcopal in governance. It has approximately 130 congregations in 14 states and 4 countries and a membership of over 50,000. Its headquarters is in Philadelphia, Pennsylvania.

== History ==
Founded by Ida B. Robinson, the organization is the only organization founded by an African-American woman that held consistent female leadership from its founding in 1924 until February 2001.

In 1924, while fasting and praying in the church for ten days, Robinson said she received a revelation from God: "The Holy Ghost spoke and said, ‘Come out on Mount Sinai.'" On May 20, 1924, the State of Pennsylvania granted her a charter for the church under the name of the Mount Sinai Holy Church of America, Incorporated.

== Doctrine ==
The doctrinal emphasis of the church is the inspired, infallible, authority of Scripture, belief in the trinity, conversion, repentance, salvation in the Lord Jesus Christ, justification, entire sanctification and baptism in the Holy Spirit. The Church teaches that baptism in the Holy Spirit is given to all Christian believers who ask for it. Divine healing is practiced, but not to the exclusion of medical supervision. Holiness of life and practice are emphasized. The ordinances of the Church, as act of obedience to Faith, are water baptism (immersion), the Lord's Supper (Holy Communion) and the Ordinance of Humility (foot washing). One particular doctrine that is solidified in the denomination's history is its beliefs on gender equality. Both men and women are considered equal in reference to official ordinations and ecclesiastical rights.

== Presiding bishops and presidents ==
Ida B. Robinson was the founder, Senior Bishop, Presiding Prelate and first President from 1924 to 1946. On April 6, 1946, Ida Robinson left Philadelphia with a group of missionaries to visit some of the organization's churches in Florida. Her first stop in Florida was Jacksonville. From there she journeyed on to Winter Haven where on 20 April 1946 she died. At the time of her death, the denomination consisted of 84 churches.

Elmira Jeffries served as Senior Bishop, Presiding Prelate, and President from 1946 to 1964. She was a charter member of the denomination, and became its first vice-president. Subsequent to the death of Bishop Ida Robinson, Jeffries was set aside to the Bishopric in 1946 by Bishop W.E. Fuller, President of the Fire Baptized Holy Church. At this time, she became president of Mount Sinai Holy Church of America, Inc., and the pastor of Mount Olive Holy Temple in Philadelphia. Under her leadership, the church purchased the Physicians' and Surgeons' Hospital located 1512-1514 on 15th street in the city of Philadelphia. Today the building has been named, The Elmira Jeffries Memorial Home. On Monday, June 15, 1964, she died.

Mary E. Jackson served as Senior Bishop, Presiding Prelate, and President from 1964 to 1983. Born in 1881, she was also a charter member of the denomination. Jackson's tenure as president was the second longest in the church's history. Jackson was 83 years old when she became the denomination's president. Bishop Jackson is accredited with the creation of the National Youth Department and National Youth Convention for the denomination. On October 26, 1980, Bishop Mary Elizabeth Jackson retired from active pastorate service. When she died on November 8, 1983, her age was 102 years making her the oldest president in the history of the church. Her administration was also the second longest in the church's history. There is currently a book scholarship provided by the National Youth Department in honor of Bishop Mary E. Jackson.

Amy B. Stevens served as Presiding Prelate, President and Senior Bishop from 1983 to 2000. Bishop Stevens was appointed President of Mount Sinai Holy Church of America, Inc., in February, 1984. Under her administration as president of Mount Sinai Holy Church of America, Inc., she created the Mount Sinai Training Institute and the expansion of ministry on the Mount Sinai Farm. She traveled to Mount Sinai's churches in Guyana and Cuba. Bishop Stevens received an Honorary Doctorate of Theology degree from the Official Board of Christian Bible Institute and Seminary. In 1984 Bishop Stevens along with Bishop James F. Brown, Jr. (Mt. Sinai Holy Church of America), Bishop J O Patterson (President of the Church of God in Christ), Bishop J T Bowen (President of the United Holy Church of America)and Bishop J D Ellis (Pentecostal Churches of Christ) founded the International Fellowship of Black Pentecostal Churches in Memphis, Tennessee. Bishop Steven died on Thursday, September 14, 2000. She was the last president to have been with the founder when she died in Winter Haven, Fl.

Ruth E. Satchell served as Presiding Prelate and President from 2000 to 2001. After the death of Bishop Amy Stevens, Bishop Satchell, who at that time was serving as vice president, was appointed president of the denomination. Satchell was in her mid 1990s when beginning her tenure as president. She resigned as president in 2001, making her the shortest-serving president in the church's history. After her resignation she held the title of "President Emeritus" from 2001 until her death on March 1, 2011. She served as the jurisdictional bishop of the Mid-Atlantic District of the organization and was a member of the board of bishops and pastor of two churches. Prior to her presidency Bishop Satchell served as 1st Vice President, 2nd Vice President, a member of the Board of Directors and member of the Executive Board in the organization. She was 100 years old at the time of her death.

Joseph H. Bell, Sr. was Presiding Prelate and President from 2001 until December 2015. In 2001, Bell made history by becoming the first male president of the denomination. Prior to being elected to the presidency of MSHCA in February, 2001, Bishop Bell served the corporate church as its General Secretary and Secretary of the board of directors from 1982. Bell was the pastor of the Bethel Holy Church in New York City and served as jurisdictional bishop of the New York/New England district of the organization. Bell was accredited for the creation of national church "departments" that aimed to serve particular segments of the organization. Bishop Bell passed on December 17, 2015.

Emanuel Holland assumed the office of Presiding Prelate and President of MSHCA upon the passing of the late Bishop Joseph H. Bell, Sr. on December 17, 2015. His assumption of the presidency marks the first time in the church's history that a Bishop from the organization's Southern District took the office of President. Bishop Holland passed on October 7, 2023.
