= Episcopal formation =

The training and mentoring of bishops and bishops-elect

In Christianity, episcopal formation is the training and mentoring of bishops and bishops-elect. Episcopal formation is also known as episcopal development, or episcopal formation and development, and simply formation.

== Terminology ==
The term episcopal formation was first coined by the Protestant Episcopal Church in the United States of America around 2006, through its office of pastoral development. Through the Episcopal Church USA, its general convention adopted resolution 2006-A082 which established this formation program for newly ordained bishops. Earlier, between 2000 and 2002, the Catholic Church's Dicastery for Bishops launched a formation program for bishops under Pope John Paul II. As of 2026, this program has continued.

In 2015, the term episcopal formation was also used by Portland State University professor John S. Ott in Bishops, Authority and Community in Northwestern Europe, c.1050–1150.

In High Church Pentecostalism and the Convergence Movement, the term has been used by the Joint College of African-American Pentecostal Bishops and the Congress of Apostles and Bishops as of 2026—and the congress disputed exclusive ownership over the term in reference to training programs.

== See also ==
- Bishop
- Catechism
