= Apostolic Pastoral Congress =

Collegiate collective of Christian bishops, pastors and other clergy in Great Britain

The Apostolic Pastoral Congress (APC) or Apostolic Pastoral Congress of Great Britain, is a network of Christian bishops, pastors and other clergy in the United Kingdom of Great Britain and Northern Ireland. The APC and its bishops claim apostolic succession. The Apostolic Pastoral Congress is a member of Churches Together in England (CTE). The organisation is also a member of Churches Together in Britain and Ireland and the Evangelical Alliance of Great Britain.

The president of the organisation is Bishop (Archbishop-Elect) Moses Owusu-Sekyere. Bishop Moses was appointed to the role in October 2021, in succession to the organisation's founder, Archbishop Doyé Agama. Bishop Moses is a trustee of Churches Together in England and chair of Churches Together in South London.

Archbishop Agama served as a trustee of Churches Together in England from March 2010-November 2018. He is a past co-president of Greater Manchester Churches Together, and he was the moderator of the Forum of Churches Together in England between 2012 and 2015.

The Apostolic Pastoral Congress is listed in the UK Directory of Black & Multicultural Churches. However, the movement also includes several Asian churches and small numbers of white British churches as well.

== History ==
The Apostolic Pastoral Congress was formed (initially under the name "Apostolic Pastoral Association") during the first decade of the 21st century. It started in northern England and now has country-wide membership. The Apostolic Pastoral Congress remains particularly active in Greater Manchester and the surrounding areas. In 2013, Bishop Doye Agama, who was at that time the presiding prelate of the Apostolic Pastoral Congress, was elevated to the status of archbishop, at a ceremony held in Southwark Cathedral at London Bridge in central London, England.

== Statistics ==
As of 2013, the Apostolic Pastoral Congress had more than 60 members.

== Doctrine ==
The Apostolic Pastoral Congress is High Church Pentecostal in character, firmly evangelical in its soteriology, and sacramental in theology and practice; regarding its relation to Convergence, it is also broad church. Members of the Congress use adapted forms of ancient church liturgy whenever sacraments are expressed, but at other times allow more open styles of Pentecostal worship. As such, it may be identified as being part of the Convergence Movement.

The Congress also promotes knowledge of and respect for the ancient Christian Church of the first millennium in the British Isles, and for the ancient Christian Church worldwide.

Congress policy is to preach and practice baptism by full immersion in water, following confession of faith in Jesus Christ and a personal infilling of the Holy Spirit, evidenced by what it perceives the biblical gifts (see spiritual gift) and fruit of the Holy Spirit. The Apostolic Pastoral Congress is dedicated to promoting holy living which its members believe the right result of salvation in Christ.

There is particular emphasis upon the spiritual heritage deriving from early monastic communities such as those at Whithorn (Candida Casa) (see St Ninian of Whithorn) in Galloway, Scotland, Iona and Lindisfarne and from the seventh century north African (Berber) scholar-monk Hadrian of Canterbury (Adrian of Canterbury) (Hadrian the African) (c.635 - 710) and Antony of Egypt.
