= J. Delano Ellis =

American pastor (1944–2020)

The Most Reverend Jesse Delano Ellis II
- Metropolitan Archbishop of the Joint College of Bishops, Presiding Prelate of the Pentecostal Churches of Christ, and Senior Pastor of the Pentecostal Church of Christ (Cleveland, Ohio)
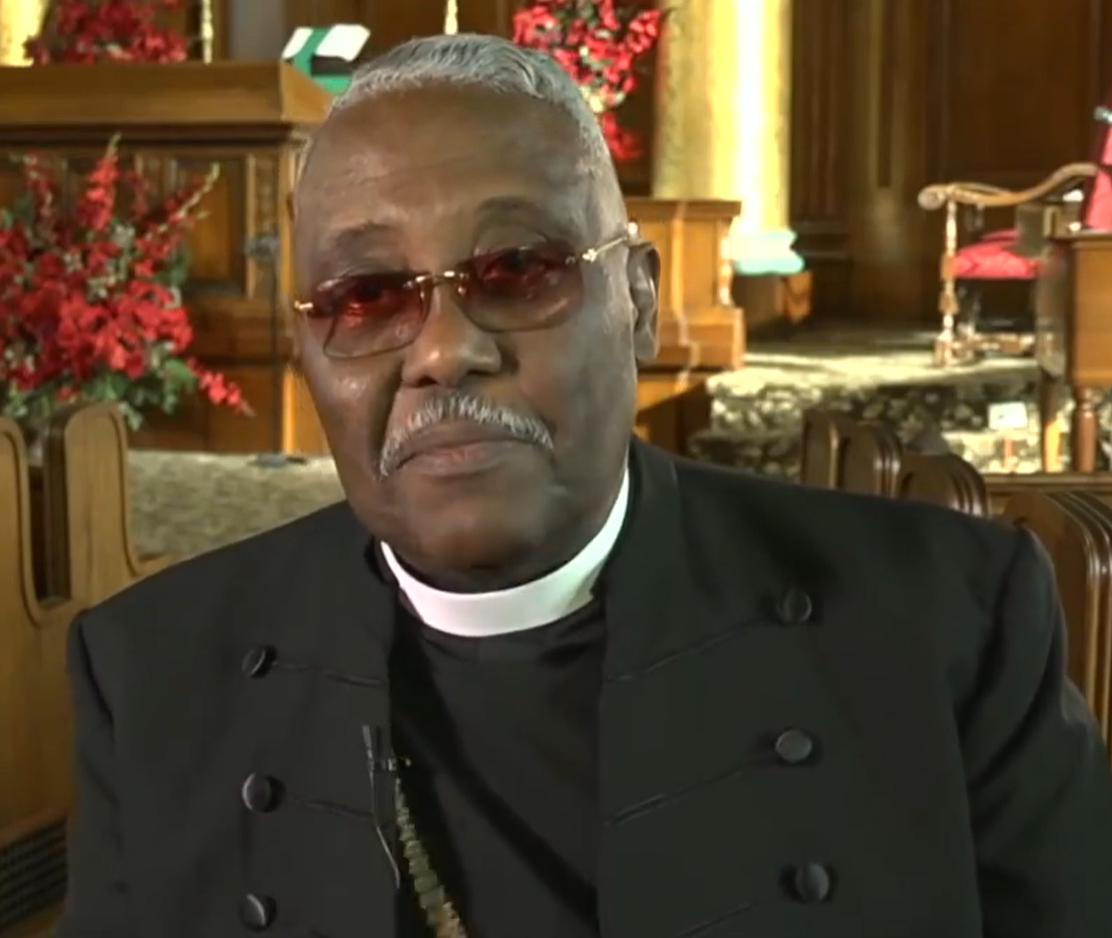
- Church: Pentecostal Churches of Christ
- See: Pentecostal Church of Christ

Orders
- Ordination: 1963 by O. T. Jones Sr.
- Consecration: 1970 by Brumfield Johnson

Personal details
- Born: Jesse Delano Ellis; December 11, 1944 Philadelphia, Pennsylvania
- Died: September 19, 2020 (aged 75) Cleveland, Ohio
- Residence: Cleveland, Ohio
- Children: 6
- Occupation: Pastor, author
- Education: Howard University, BA; Nazarene Theological Seminary, MRE; Stafford University, PhD
- Coat of arms: Jesse Delano Ellis II's coat of arms

Jesse Delano Ellis II, commonly known as J. Delano Ellis, (December 11, 1944 – September 19, 2020) was an American Protestant religious leader and progenitor of unity among African American Pentecostals with Trinitarian and nontrinitarian affinities through the Joint College of African-American Pentecostal Bishops.

Ordained an elder at the age of 19 within the Church of God in Christ, and elevated as bishop at the age of 26, Ellis established and served as presiding prelate for the United Pentecostal Churches of Christ (today the United Covenant Churches of Christ) and Pentecostal Churches of Christ. He served as the senior pastor of the Pentecostal Church of Christ in Cleveland, Ohio, beginning on May 14, 1989.

Through Ellis, many Trinitarian and Oneness Pentecostal denominations claim to derive "western and eastern streams of apostolic succession" as described in the appendix to his book, The Bishopric – A Handbook on Creating Episcopacy in the African-American Pentecostal Church. According to Ellis, claims of succession stemmed from the Church of England, the Methodist Episcopal Church, and the Church of God in Christ; he also claimed apostolic succession through the Syro-Chaldean Church. Through Catholic, Orthodox, and Anglican understandings, his claims to apostolic succession are rejected. In 2026, Robert Woodward Burgess II—whom Ellis claimed extended apostolic succession—and his clergy denounced Ellis, the Joint College of Bishops, and all who claimed to be in holy orders and apostolic succession from him.

== Biography ==
=== Early life ===
J. Delano Ellis II was the son of Lucy and Jesse Delano Ellis Sr. At age 13 or 14, Lucy became pregnant with Ellis. His mother was a Christian and his father rejected Christianity for the Moorish Science Temple of America and then the Nation of Islam. During his childhood, his mother was placed in a mental health institution; and he then lived with his grandmother and great aunt.

During his teen years, Ellis attempted to establish a relationship with his father by attending a Nation of Islam mosque. His father told them Jesus was the "white man's god and Christianity was a trick designed to enslave black people." Ellis began attending the Christian Tabernacle Church of God in Christ under the pastorate of Bishop R.T. Jones Sr. One night at the church Ellis professed Christianity and claimed his father physically abused him for rejecting Islam (see also: apostasy in Islam).

In his early adulthood, Ellis joined the United States Air Force and attended the Church of the Nazarene. Due to racial segregation he joined the Christian Methodist Episcopal Church and developed an appreciation of high church liturgy and ecclesiology. He soon returned to the Church of God in Christ.

=== Ministry ===
In 1963, Ellis was ordained at the age of 19 by Bishop Ozro Thurston Jones Sr. of the Church of God in Christ; he was later elevated to the episcopacy at the age of 26 by Bishop Brumfield Johnson of the United Holy Church of America. In the Church of God in Christ, Ellis organized the Adjutant's Corp. He served as the third Chief Adjutant of the National Adjutancy of the Church of God in Christ. Establishing the Adjutant's Corp for the Church of God in Christ, Ellis used his education and exposure to Anglicanism which culminated in the denomination and other Pentecostal bodies adopting Anglican vestments.

In 1989, Ellis was asked to lead a Oneness Pentecostal congregation outside of the Church of God in Christ. He determined Oneness Pentecostalism and Trinitarianism weren't entirely different conceptions, yet rejected distinctions between the persons of the Trinity. He came to believe there was no scriptural support for the doctrine of Trinitarian Christianity. Ellis soon after founded the United Pentecostal Churches of Christ (today the United Covenant Churches of Christ).

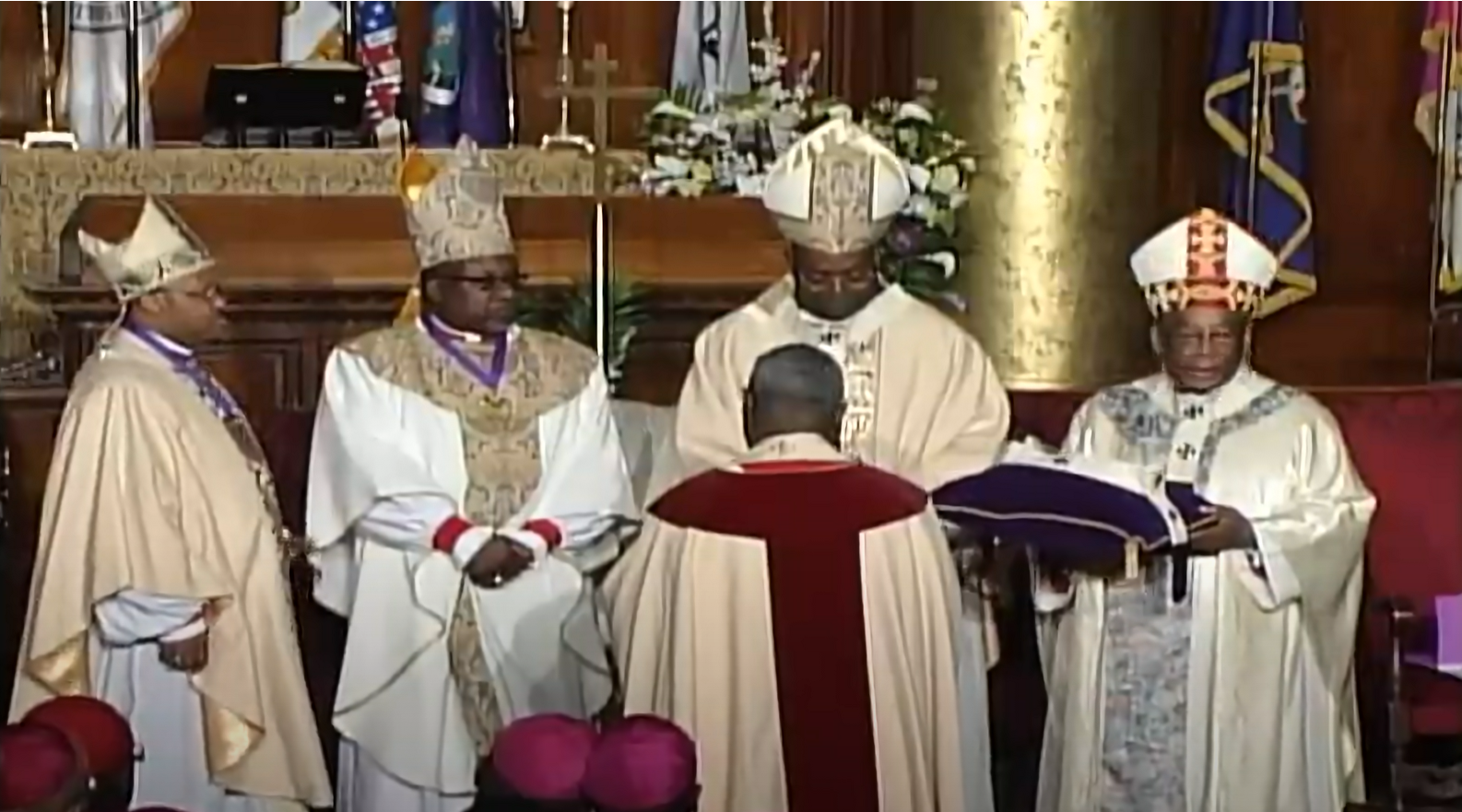
J. Delano Ellis during his apostolic investiture as metropolitan archbishop

During his tenure as presiding prelate of the United Pentecostal Churches of Christ, he co-founded the Joint College of African-American Pentecostal Bishops. He was also elected as chairman of the organization, and elected and vested as a metropolitan archbishop.

Through this organization, Ellis introduced apostolic succession to many within the African-American Christian tradition, and the college reappropriated the history and purpose of vestments and the episcopacy for their Protestant traditions in contrast with their initial users in Roman Catholicism and Anglicanism.

Reappropriating the original and historic meanings, Ellis and the college taught the chimere was a prophetic garment; in contrast, the chimere was originally part of academic dress before adoption by Anglican bishops. Scarlet or red chimeres were also traditionally only worn by bishops with doctorates of divinity, while all others wore black. Ellis and the Joint College also taught the fascia was the "towel used to wash His [Jesus] disciples feet," though it was worn by all Catholic clergy since 1624, and symbolizes chastity. Leaders within the episcopal college also promoted the five-fold ministry of the Apostolic-Prophetic movement, and the ordination of women.

During theological disputes on Christian universalism within the Joint College due to Carlton Pearson's influence, Ellis and the college's board denounced Pearson as a heretic for advocating universalism. Under his administration, the Joint College of African-American Pentecostal Bishops also controversially admitted and certified gay bishop O.C. Allen of the Vision Church of Atlanta in 2012. By 2015, Ellis served as a co-consecrator for Marvin Sapp's episcopal consecration within the Global United Fellowship.

=== Controversy, later life ===
In 1995, Ellis was fired after briefly serving as a city police chaplain for his comments toward Muslims, stating Islam was "bloody and dangerous" at worst. In 2001, Ellis resigned from a local faith committee over antisemitic controversy. As late as the 21st century, Ellis also served as a member of Eureka Lodge No. 52 of the Prince Hall Freemasons. He was a grand prior and 33rd degree mason.

After 30 years of leadership at the Pentecostal Church of Christ in Cleveland, Ellis abdicated his pastorate in 2019, and his wife, Dr. Sabrina Ellis, was appointed the new senior pastor.

On September 19, 2020, Ellis died, according to an announcement from his wife. Before he died, a street was named in his honor. The Potter's House Church founder Thomas Dexter Jakes preached at his funeral. Following his death, Bishop Woodson of the PCC's Mid-South Episcopal Diocese was elected as new presiding prelate for the Pentecostal Churches of Christ.

== Apostolic succession claims ==
In an appendix to his book The Bishopric – A Handbook on Creating Episcopacy in the African-American Pentecostal Church, Ellis claimed both "western and eastern streams of apostolic succession" for himself and for the United Pentecostal Churches of Christ.

Ellis claimed "western and eastern streams of apostolic succession." He claimed "western streams of succession" via the Church of England, John Wesley, Thomas Coke, Francis Asbury, the Methodist Episcopal Church and the Church of God in Christ. The claimed succession from the Methodist Episcopal Church is stated as being via three Church of God in Christ bishops (David Charles Williams, Carl Edward Williams and Reuben Timothy Jones), all of whom held holy orders from the Methodist Episcopal Church. In his book, he made no claim or comment at all as to whether the line of succession via Wesley, Coke, Asbury and the Methodist Episcopal Church carries unbroken apostolic succession as distinct from presbyteral succession only. He also didn't indicate that Williams, Williams and Jones possessed episcopal consecration from the Methodist Episcopal Church, nor does he cite any episcopal apostolic lineage for their status as bishops of the Church of God in Christ. Additionally, Wesley was an Anglican priest, but he was not an Anglican bishop. Some believe that Wesley was secretly elevated as bishop by Greek Orthodox bishop Erasmus of Arcadia in 1763. Others believe Wesley's stance that apostolic succession could be transmitted through presbyters, and that he was a scriptural episkopos.

Ellis also noted that in 1964 he had been ordained presbyter by Bishop Ozro Thurston Jones of the Church of God in Christ, and he notes his episcopal consecration in 1970 by Bishop Brumfield Johnson of the Mount Calvary Holy Church of America. His book cited no episcopal apostolic lineage for this 1970 consecration either.

"Eastern streams of succession" were traced by Ellis from the Syro-Chaldean Church in the East, via Archbishop Bertram S. Schlossberg (Mar Uzziah), Archbishop-Metropolitan of the Syro-Chaldean Church of North America, also known as the Evangelical Apostolic Church of North America; in 1995, Ellis claimed that the Evangelical Apostolic Church of North America entered into collegial fellowship with the United Pentecostal Churches of Christ. Ellis wrote that at a holy convocation of the United Pentecostal Churches of Christ, Bishop Robert Woodward Burgess II (representing Archbishop Schlossberg, who was living in Jerusalem) had assisted at the elevation of a number of additional bishops. Burgess denied assisting and conferring succession to anyone.

According to Michael Ramsey—once the Archbishop of Canterbury (1961–1974)—the validity of someone's apostolic succession pertains to continuity of teaching, preaching, governing, ordination and grace. In Catholic theology, apostolic succession effects the power and authority to administer the sacraments except for baptism and matrimony; thus, apostolic succession is necessary for the valid celebration of the sacraments. Through the Anglican and Catholic understandings of holy orders and the sacramental character imprinted upon those ordained, and those who claim to be within an episcopal apostolic succession; Anglican and Catholic theologians historically reject Ellis and the Joint College's claims, as he converted to Oneness Pentecostalism, breaking theological continuity. In contrast, also with the early Church Fathers and Roman Catholicism, which rejects women's ordination, Ellis and the college also affirmed the ordination of women.

== See also ==
- Joint College of African-American Pentecostal Bishops
