= Stacey Sargeant =

American actress

- Education: Syracuse University
- Occupation: Actress

Stacey Sargeant is an American actress. She has been nominated for Drama Desk, Drama League, and Lucille Lortel awards and is the recipient of the South Korea Daegu International Musical Festival Best Supporting Actress Award and the New York Musical Theatre Festival Outstanding Individual Performance Award.

== Early life ==
Sargeant was born to a Trinidadian father and Tobagonian mother and raised in Brooklyn, New York. She attended La Guardia Performing Arts High School.

== Education ==
Sargeant earned a BFA in musical theatre from Syracuse University.

== Career ==
Sargeant is mainly known for her roles in Netflix's The Forty-Year-Old Version and in National Geographic's Genius: Aretha. She played Dinah Washington in the latter.

In June 2025, it was announced that Sargeant would play Mrs. Who in a new musical production of A Wrinkle in Time at Washington D.C.'s Arena Stage.

== Film ==
Work	Year
Chosen Family	2024
Reunion (short)	2023
The Snakes (short)	2021
The Forty-Year-Old Version	2020
Come Sunday	2018
Top Five	2014
Obvious Child	2014

== Television ==
Work	Year
The Equalizer	2024
FBI: Most Wanted	2022
Genius: Aretha Franklin	2021
Bull	2020-2021
Blue Bloods	2020
Elementary	2016
The Blacklist	2013-2014
Gossip Girl	2012
Glee	2011
Law & Order: SVU	2007
Guiding Light

== Theatre ==
Work	Year	Venue	Ref
A Wrinkle In Time	2025	Arena Stage	
La Race	2022	McGinn/Cazale Theater, Women's Project Theater	
Nantucket Sleigh Ride	2019	Lincoln Center Theater	
Homos, Or Everyone in America	2016	Bank Street Theater	
The Taming of the Shrew	2016	Shakespeare in the Park	
Eclipsed	2015	Yale Repertory Theatre	
Big Love	2015	Signature Theatre	
Our Lady of Kibeho	2014	Signature Theatre	
Rent	2009	Weston Playhouse	
Legally Blonde	2008	National tour	
Damn Yankees	2008	City Center	
Kiss Me, Kate	2007	Repertory Theatre	
A Midsummer Night's Dream	2006	Paper Mill Playhouse, McCarter Theatre	
Two Gentlemen of Verona	2005	Delacorte Theatre	
Purlie	2005	City Center	
The Color Purple	2004	Alliance Theatre	
Harlem Song	2002	Apollo Theatre	
Little Ham	2001	Hudson Guild Theatre	
