= Pentecostal Churches of Christ =

Protestant Christian denomination

- Abbreviation: PCC
- Type: Western Christian
- Classification: Protestant
- Orientation: Pentecostal
- Theology: Oneness Pentecostalism
- Presiding Prelate: Darryl D. Woodson
- Headquarters: Cleveland, Ohio, U.S.
- Founder: J. Delano Ellis
- Branched from: United Pentecostal Churches of Christ
- Official website: https://www.pcceverywhere.org

The Pentecostal Churches of Christ (PCC) is a Protestant Christian denomination in the Oneness Pentecostal tradition. The Pentecostal Churches of Christ self-identify as "Anglican-Apostolic". The Pentecostal Churches of Christ was founded and initially led by Archbishop J. Delano Ellis, and its national cathedral is in Cleveland, Ohio, United States while the seat of its primate is currently Memphis, Tennessee.

== History ==
Following a meeting on May 29, 1992, convened in Ohio by Archbishop Ellis, several congregations affiliated together as the United Pentecostal Churches of Christ. The then newly formed United Pentecostal Churches of Christ recognized Ellis as their general overseer and president on August 22, 1992. Ellis continued in this role with United Pentecostal Churches of Christ for twelve years until he resigned in June 2004. He would be succeeded by Bishop Larry Trotter and Bishop Eric Garnes.

As of 2014, at least two distinct Pentecostal Christian denominations look to the May 29, 1992 meeting convened by J. Delano Ellis as their starting-point or as a particular landmark on their journey, and that regard the first twelve or more years of the United Pentecostal Churches of Christ as part of their history. These two are the Pentecostal Churches of Christ and United Covenant Churches of Christ; the Pentecostal Churches of Christ also regards 1935 as its year of organization through the Pentecostal Church of Christ in Cleveland. When Bishop Garnes was installed as presiding bishop of United Covenant Churches of Christ on October 30, 2009, Ellis was chief installer at the ceremony of installation.

In 2020, after the death of Archbishop J. Delano Ellis, Bishop Darryl D. Woodson was elected as second presiding prelate for the Pentecostal Churches of Christ.

== Doctrine ==
The Pentecostal Churches of Christ is a Oneness Pentecostal denomination, adhering to a form of Modalistic Monarchianism. Within the PCC, baptism is also done only in Jesus name. The denomination also believes in divine healing and considers the Lord's Supper as a sacrament. Additional essentials to its doctrine has been the adoption of an episcopal-presbyterial polity, governed by a house of bishops and board of overseers. Through the Joint College of African-American Pentecostal Bishops, the PCC claims their founder's holy orders and apostolic succession, which had been repudiated by Robert Woodward Burgess II as having never been conferred.

== See also ==
- J. Delano Ellis
- United Pentecostal Churches of Christ
- United Covenant Churches of Christ
