= Ida B. Robinson =

American bishop

Bishop Ida Bell Robinson
- Born: August 3, 1891; Hazlehurst, Georgia, U.S.
- Died: April 20, 1946 (aged 54); Winter Haven, Florida, U.S.
- Occupations: Senior Bishop, Mount Sinai Holy Church of America, Pastor and Evangelist
- Predecessor: None
- Successor: Elmira Jeffries

Ida B. Robinson (August 3, 1891 – April 20, 1946) was an American Charismatic denominational leader. She was the founder, first Senior Bishop and President of the Mount Sinai Holy Church of America, Inc. Robinson formed the organization in response to her vision and Divine Call to secure an organizational home where women preachers would be welcomed and encouraged. Mount Sinai Holy Church of America is the only organization founded by an African-American woman that held consistent female leadership from its founding in 1924 until February 2001.

== Marriage and beginning of ministry ==
Ida Bell married Oliver Robinson in 1910. Though they never had children they adopted a niece, also named Ida Bell. The niece was the daughter of Ida Robinson's brother, Charles. Ida and Oliver left Florida for Philadelphia in hopes of finding better employment opportunities in 1917. Upon arrival to the city, Ida joined a small holiness congregation at Seventeenth and South Streets. That congregation was pastored by Elder Benjamin Smith. During her tenure at the church, Ida would at times fill in for Elder Smith when he was unable to minister. Due to her animated preaching style and her singing ability, the membership of the small congregation began to grow. Complications between her and leadership of the church eventually led to her leaving the church and affiliating herself with the United Holy Church of America where she was consecrated to the ministry through ordination. Ida Robinson was ordained in public as a "Gospel Preacher" by Bishop Henry L. Fisher.

Ida Robinson was appointed as pastor of a small church in 1919. She stressed and preached holiness as a divine requirement; holiness as a work of the Holy Ghost; holiness as a condition to seeing God. The congregation began to grow quickly. However, she began to feel that ministry opportunities for women in United Holy Church were limited.

== Founding of Mount Sinai Holy Church of America ==
The year of 1924 was a very important year in the life of Ida Robinson. During the beginning of 1924, Bishop Robinson on several occasions revealed to a number of persons that God revealed Himself to her through visions and dreams. It was her belief that God wanted to use her as a vehicle to establish a church that would "loose the women" and allow full clergy rights to them. While fasting and praying in the church for ten days, she stated she again received a revelation from God. She stated to members of Mount Olive that “The Holy Ghost spoke and said, ‘Come out on Mount Sinai.” After receiving this message from God, Bishop Robinson was confident that she understood what God meant for her to do.

On May 20, 1924, the State of Pennsylvania granted her a charter for the new organization. Keeping in mind that the call of the Holy Spirit that she envisioned, the charter for the new church was granted under the name of the Mount Sinai Holy Church of America, Incorporated. At the time of its founding, the church leadership consisted of nine officials. Out of the nine officials, six were women. The growth of Mount Sinai was rapid and quickly spread across the east coast of the United States. Elder Robinson was consecrated as bishop at the organization's first Holy Convocation in 1925. Her separation from United Holy Church was one of mutual agreement. Leaders of her parent organization were in attendance at the first Holy Convocation of Mount Sinai and continued to fellowship with the organization during her leadership and after.

== End of life ==
On April 6, 1946, Ida Robinson left Philadelphia with a group of missionaries to visit some of the organization's churches in Florida. Her first stop in Florida was Jacksonville. From there she journeyed on to Winter Haven. Upon arrival to Winter Haven, Florida, she fell very ill. On April 20, Bishop Ida Robinson died. When she died, the denomination consisted of 84 churches, more than 160 ordained ministers of whom 125 were women, an accredited school in Philadelphia, mission work in Cuba and Guyana, and a farm in South Jersey that provided a safe haven away from the city for church members.

== Sources ==
- Official Website of the Mount Sinai Holy Church of America http://mtsinaiholychurch.org/home.html
- http://www.blackpast.org/?q=aah/robinson-ida-bell-1891-1946
- ""Ida_Robinson": A History of Women and Religion in America By Susan Hill Lindley, Published by Westminster John Knox Press, 1996, pages 335-336, ISBN 0-664-25799-2, ISBN 978-0-664-25799-6

https://www.amazon.com/You-Have-Stept-Your-Place/dp/0664257992

- The handbook of the Mount Sinai Holy Church of America
- Daughters of Thunder: Black Women Preachers and Their Sermons, 1850-1979 By Bettye Collier-Thomas, Published by Jossey-Bass, 1997, pages 194-209, ISBN 0-7879-0918-1, ISBN 978-0-7879-0918-5

https://www.amazon.com/Daughters-Thunder-Preachers-Sermons-1850-1979/dp/0787909181/ref=sr_1_1?ie=UTF8&s=books&qid=1228742288&sr=1-1

- "Reshaping Black Pastoral Theology: The Vision of Bishop Ida B. Robinson" Dr. Harold Dean Trulear, Journal of Religious Thought;vol 46, 17-31p (Howard Divinity Library)
- African-American Holiness Pentecostal Movement: An Annotated Bibliography By Sherry Sherrod DuPree Published by Taylor & Francis, 1996 ISBN 0-8240-1449-9, ISBN 978-0-8240-1449-0, 650 pages
- U.S. African American Denominations in Cuba by Dodson, Jualynne E. (1994) Contributions in Black Studies: Vol. 12, Article 4. UMASS Amherst Libraries, http://scholarworks.umass.edu/cgi/viewcontent.cgi?article=1080&context=cibs
- Encyclopedia of Women and Religion in North America: Integrating the worlds of women's religious experience in North America, by Rosemary Skinner Keller, Rosemary Radford Ruether, Marie Cantlon, Published by Indiana University Press, 2006, ISBN 0-253-34685-1, ISBN 978-0-253-34685-8
- http://www.nwhm.org/exhibits/AfricanAmerican/13.html
- The Ordination of Women:An Issue among ‘Spirit-filled’ Churches from the African Diaspora

By Antipas L. Harris, http://people.bu.edu/wwildman/WeirdWildWeb/courses/thth/projects/thth_projects_2003_harris.htm
