= United Pentecostal Churches of Christ =

Disambiguation: This wikipage is about a group of churches holding Trinitarian beliefs. For the Oneness Pentecostal movement called United Pentecostal Church or United Pentecostal Church International or UPCI, see United Pentecostal Church International.

United Pentecostal Churches of Christ was a name used from 1992 until at least 2004 as the name of a Holiness Pentecostal denomination in the United States of America. Formed during 1992 as a result of a meeting convened by J. Delano Ellis, at least two Christian denominations claim descent from this organization: the Pentecostal Churches of Christ, and the United Covenant Churches of Christ. By the time of its founder's retirement, the denomination had 17 bishops, 300 churches, and approximately 500,000 members.
