= United Covenant Churches of Christ =

- Abbreviation: UCCC
- Type: Western Christian
- Classification: Protestant
- Orientation: Interdenominational
- Presiding Prelate: Glenn E. Livingston
- Headquarters: Orlando, Florida, U.S.
- Founder: J. Delano Ellis
- Branched from: United Pentecostal Churches of Christ
- Official website: https://www.uccconline.org

The United Covenant Churches of Christ (UCCC) is a Christian denomination established in the United States of America. The UCCC descends from the United Pentecostal Churches of Christ, which was established by Metropolitan Archbishop J. Delano Ellis.

== History ==
The United Covenant Churches of Christ was originally established as the United Pentecostal Churches of Christ, in 1992 by J. Delano Ellis. By 1993, the denomination drafted and adopted its first constitution.

In 2004, Ellis resigned from his primacy over the United Pentecostal Churches of Christ, and Bishop Larry D. Trotter succeeded him to office. Under his leadership, the United Pentecostal Churches of Christ amended its name to the United Covenant Churches of Christ.

In 2009, Trotter was succeeded by Eric D. Garnes, who, by 2020, was succeeded by Glenn E. Livingston.

== Organization ==
As of 2025, the UCCC has churches in Massachusetts, New York State, Pennsylvania, Maryland, Delaware, Virginia, the Carolinas, Georgia, Florida, Texas, Illinois, Indiana, and Michigan. All churches are under the authority of the denomination's presiding prelate, general board, and other auxiliaries.
