= Carlton Pearson =

American minister, activist, and writer

Bishop Carlton Pearson
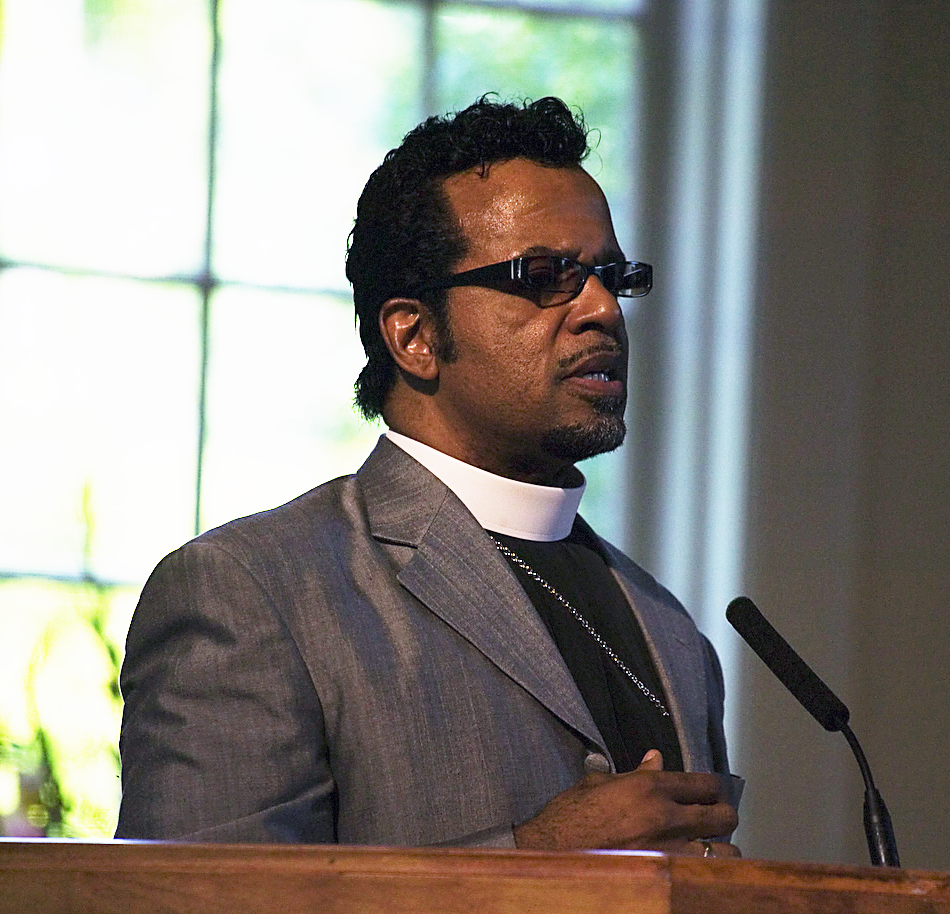
- Bishop Carlton Pearson delivering a sermon in 2001.
- Born: Carlton D'Metrius Pearson; March 19, 1953; San Diego, California, U.S.
- Died: November 19, 2023 (aged 70); Tulsa, Oklahoma, U.S.
- Education: Oral Roberts University (attended)
- Occupations: Christian minister, Gospel singer
- Spouse: Gina Marie Gauthier (m. 1993; div. 2019)

Ecclesiastical career
- Ordained: United Church of Christ (2006), Church of God in Christ (c. 1981)

Religious life
- Religion: Christianity (Mainline Protestantism)
- Denomination: United Protestant (of the United Church of Christ), Unitarian Universalist (of the Unitarian Universalist Association)
- Church: All Souls Unitarian Church of Tulsa (2008 - 2023); Higher Dimensions Family Church (1981 - 2008)
- Profession: Minister
- Website: www.bishoppearson.com

Carlton D'Metrius Pearson (March 19, 1953 – November 19, 2023) was an American Mainline Protestant minister, Christian Universalist, and gospel music artist. At one time, he was the pastor of the Higher Dimensions Evangelistic Center Incorporated, later named the Higher Dimensions Family Church, which was one of the largest churches in Tulsa, Oklahoma. During the 1990s, it grew to an average attendance of over 6,000.

Due to his stated belief in universal reconciliation, Pearson rapidly began to lose his influence in ministry with the Joint College of African-American Pentecostal Bishops and was eventually declared a heretic by his peers in 2004.

Pearson was subsequently the senior minister of Christ Universal Temple, a large New Thought congregation in Chicago, Illinois; head of New Dimensions gathering in Chicago; and an affiliate minister at Tulsa's All Souls Unitarian Church.

== Early career ==
Carlton D'Metrius Pearson was born on March 19, 1953, in San Diego, California. He attended Oral Roberts University in Tulsa, where he was mentored by Oral Roberts, and sang with the World Action Singers, later becoming an associate evangelist with the Oral Roberts Evangelistic Association. He was licensed and ordained in the Church of God in Christ.

Along with Dr. Frederick K. C. Price Sr., he was at one time one of only two African-American ministers to host a weekly national television preaching show, reaching hundreds of thousands to millions of people weekly, and has been credited as being one of the first black ministers to hold major conferences in arenas and stadiums across the country.

Pearson was also the host of the AZUSA Conference in Tulsa. Pearson was also a traveling evangelist, holding two-day revivals across the continent. Pearson also gave many up-and-coming ministers and singers national exposure and a global audience, including T. D. Jakes, Joyce Meyer, and Donnie McClurkin.

Pearson was also a gospel vocalist who won two Stellar Awards, and he was nominated for a Dove Award.

=== Gospel of Inclusion ===
After watching a television program about the wretched conditions of people suffering and dying from the 1994 genocide in Rwanda, and considering the teachings of his church that non-Christians were going to Hell, Pearson reported receiving an epiphany from God. He stated publicly that he doubted the existence of Hell as a place of eternal torment. He said that hell is created on earth by human depravity and behavior.

In February 2002, Pearson lost a primary election for the office of mayor of Tulsa. By then Pearson had begun to call his doctrine—a variation on universal reconciliation—the Gospel of Inclusion and many in his congregation began to leave.

In March 2004, after hearing Pearson's argument for inclusion, the Joint College of African-American Pentecostal Bishops concluded that such teaching was heresy. Declared a heretic by his peers, Pearson rapidly began to lose his influence in the evangelical fundamentalist church. Membership at the Higher Dimensions Family Church fell below 1,000, and the church lost its building to foreclosure in January 2006. The church members began meeting at Trinity Episcopal Church on Sunday afternoons as the renamed New Dimensions Worship Center.

=== Higher Dimensions Worship Center ===
In 1981, Pearson, along with a few former ORU classmates and friends, founded the Higher Dimensions Evangelistic Center. Beginning in a small storefront in Jenks, Oklahoma, the church plant quickly grew and within six months, the storefront could no longer hold the ever-growing, diverse congregation.

Within a few years, Higher Dimensions acquired property on South Memorial Drive in Tulsa, not far from Oral Roberts University. The church's popularity in Tulsa began to expand nationwide, partly due to Pearson’s affiliation with Oral Roberts & Pearson’s weekly christian television broadcast, Everything's Gonna Be Alright.

In 2006, Pearson was ordained as a United Church of Christ minister.

In June 2008, the then renamed New Dimensions Worship Center moved its services to the All Souls Unitarian Church in Tulsa. On September 7, 2008, Pearson held his final service for the New Dimensions Worship Center, and it was absorbed into the All Souls Unitarian Church.

=== Christ Universal Temple (Chicago) ===
In May 2009, Pearson was named the interim minister of the Christ Universal Temple, a large New Thought congregation in Chicago, Illinois. On January 3, 2011, it was reported that he had left this position.

=== New Dimensions Chicago and return to Tulsa ===
In 2014, Pearson returned to Tulsa to be with his ailing father who died two days after Pearson's 62nd birthday. He began preaching at the 11 am service at All Souls Unitarian Church on the third Sunday of the month, while still traveling to Chicago to preach once a month at New Dimensions Chicago, the fellowship he founded there. Pearson also began holding a monthly discussion with a guest before a live audience at Tulsa's "My Studio" in May 2015. His first conversation was with Neale Donald Walsch, author of the mega-best-selling nine-book series, Conversations with God.

=== Illness and death ===
In September 2023, Pearson was diagnosed with cancer on the lining of the bladder. He died on November 19, 2023, at the age of 70.

== Come Sunday ==
In July 2010 it was announced that director Marc Forster would direct a feature film about Pearson's life, from a script by Marcus Hinchey based on This American Life's "Heretics" episode. In January 2017, Joshua Marston was reported to be directing the project as a film for Netflix, with Chiwetel Ejiofor cast to play Pearson, Condola Rashad as his wife Gina, and Martin Sheen as Oral Roberts. The film, entitled Come Sunday, premiered at the 2018 Sundance Film Festival and was released on Netflix on April 13, 2018.

== Personal life ==
A person who spends every day getting drunk, will ruin their health, marriage, family, and career; they will make their lives a living Hell. But that still falls far short of the chronic alcoholic being condemned by a just God to literally burn in Hell forever and ever.For others it may very well be that the punishment merited by their sins is greater than what they receive in this life. For those people perhaps there will be some kind of punishment after death, but we believe that it will be remedial and corrective rather than just punishment for punishment's sake. Exactly what that will be and how long it will last we don't know. Will Hell for some people last 10 minutes or 10 million years... we don't know. But this we do know: Hell will not last for eternity; it will not be endless... Don't sin. Be reunited with God now, rather than after you have put yourself (and those you love) through Hell.

— Pearson's belief in Hell as stated on his web site

In September 1993, Pearson was married at age 40 to Gina Marie Gauthier. She is a life coach by profession. They have two children: a son, Julian D'Metrius Pearson, born on July 9, 1994, in Tulsa, Oklahoma, and a daughter, Majestè Amour Pearson, born October 29, 1996, in Tulsa, Oklahoma.

On August 25, 2015, Gina Pearson filed for divorce. On May 19, 2016, before the divorce was finalized, Mrs. Pearson dismissed her petition for divorce. The divorce was finalized on October 3, 2019.

== Media coverage ==
- Pearson's life story was the subject of "Heretics", an episode of the Chicago Public Radio program This American Life that was first broadcast on December 16, 2005.
- Pearson's life story was telecast on the Dateline NBC program To Hell and Back, first shown on August 13, 2006.
- Pearson was the subject of a CNN story on June 24, 2007, that covered the changes in his teachings (including acceptance of LGBT people into his church) and the backlash against it.
- In March 2009, Pearson appeared on Nightline "Face Off" with Deepak Chopra, Mark Driscoll, and Annie Lobert to address the question "Does Satan Exist?"
- In September 2010, Pearson again appeared on CNN with anchor Kyra Phillips, discussing the widely publicized gay rumors regarding Bishop Eddie Long. Pearson was again criticized for his inclusive thinking by many Christian fundamentalists, for stating

Until the Church—the Church, black or otherwise—confronts—not combats—confronts this issue of human sexuality and homosexuality, which is not going away. Homosexuals and homosexuality is not going away. If every gay person in our church just left or those who have an orientation or preference or an inclination, or a fantasy, if everyone left, we wouldn't have—we wouldn't have a church.

- In December 2010, Academy Award winner Mo'Nique invited Pearson to appear on The Mo'Nique Show, her BET late night talk show. Mo'Nique publicly suggested that she followed and supported Pearson and would "come to his church in Atlanta, if he had one and would have her."

== Books ==
- The Gospel of Inclusion: Reaching Beyond Religious Fundamentalism to the True Love of God, 2007. Azusa Press/ Council Oak Books, ISBN 0-9791689-0-2.
- God Is Not a Christian, Nor a Jew, Muslim, Hindu… 2010 Atria Books/ Simon & Schuster, Inc. ISBN 1-4165-8443-9.
