= Erasmus of Arcadia =

Erasmus Έρασμος
- Bishop of Arcadia
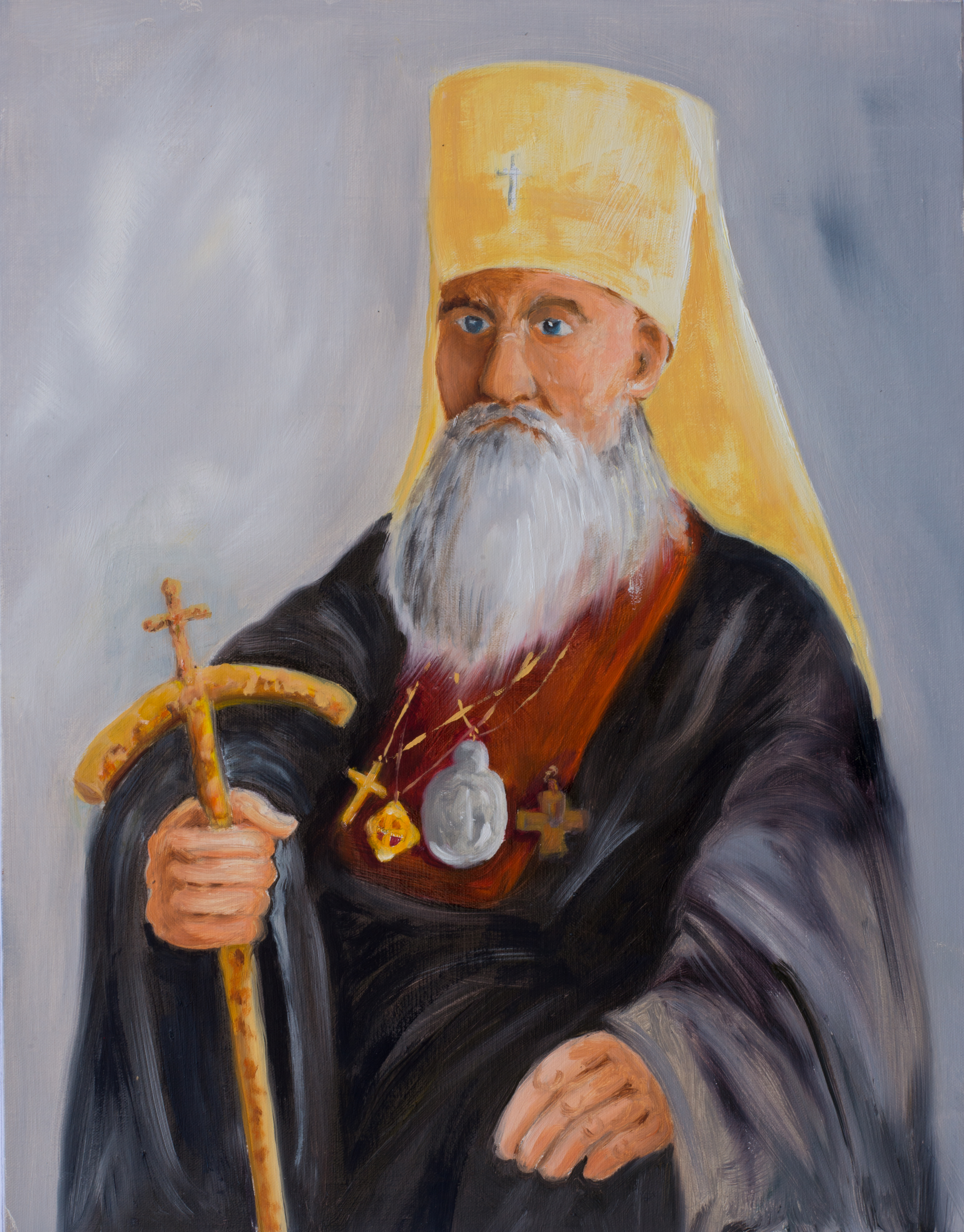
- Church: Greek Orthodox Church
- Archdiocese: Metropolis of Smyrna
- Diocese: Diocese of Arcadia
- In office: 1700s

Personal details
- Born: Crete

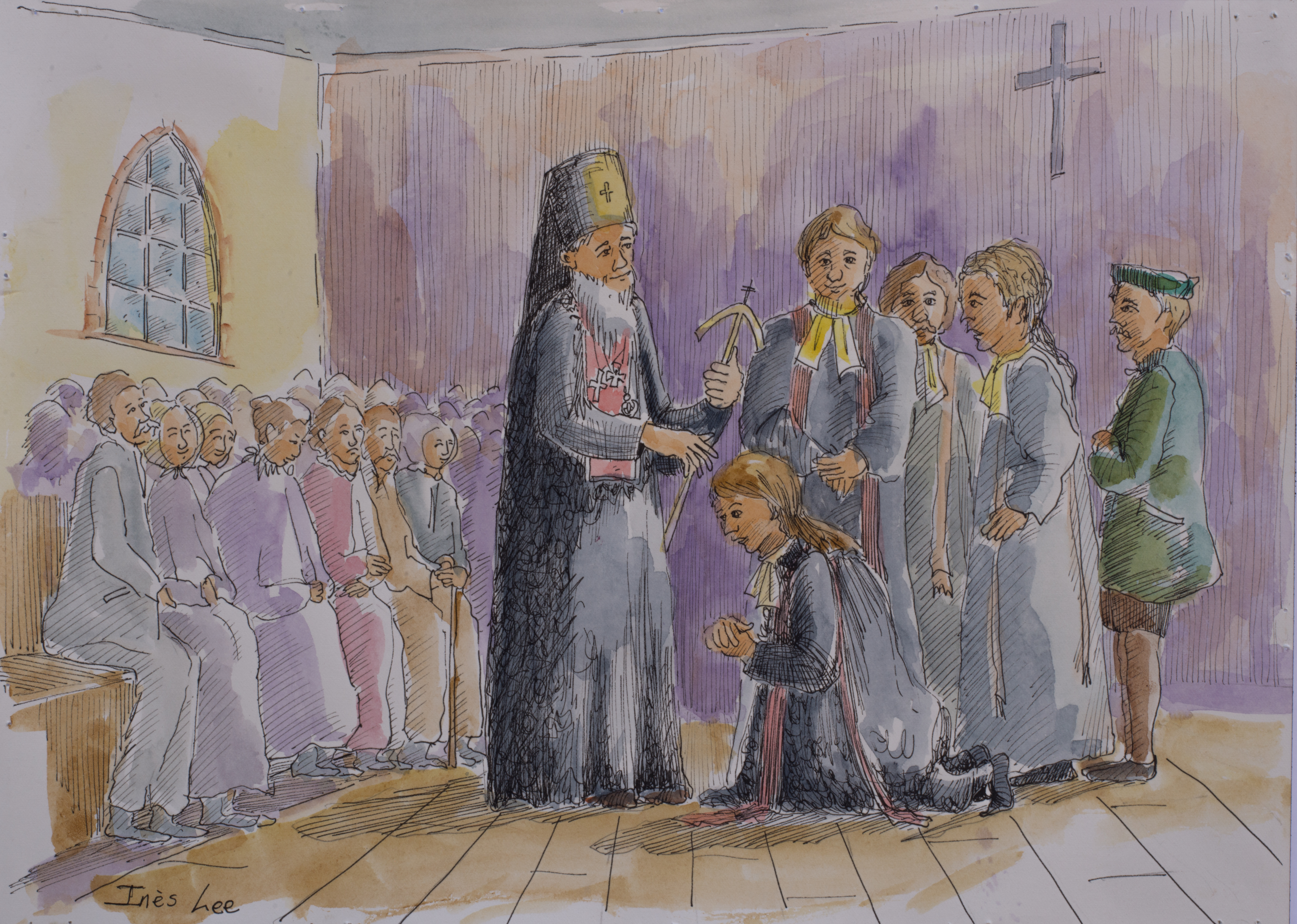
Gerasimos Avlonites Ordains John Wesley to the Episcopate, painted by Inès Lee and commissioned by Sir John Das (2018)

Erasmus of Arcadia (Greek: Έρασμος της Αρκαδίας), also known as Gerasimos Avlonites (Greek: Γεράσιμος Αυλωνίτης), was a Greek Orthodox bishop of the Diocese of Arcadia in Crete, operating under the Metropolitan of Smyrna.

Erasmus' monastery, located south of Rethymon in central Crete, was a centre of resistance to foreign domination by the Turkish régime. As such, the bishop was driven into exile around 1739. He is regarded as the founder of the first Greek Orthodox congregation in Amsterdam.

== Consecration of John Wesley ==
Some Methodists believe that the Greek bishop, while visiting London in 1763, consecrated John Wesley as a bishop and ordained several Methodist lay preachers (including John Jones and Thomas Bryant) as priests. However, Wesley could not openly announce his episcopal consecration without incurring the penalty of the Præmunire Act. In light of Erasmus's alleged episcopal consecration of Wesley, some believe that Methodists can assert participation in apostolic succession as understood in the traditional sense, because John Wesley ordained and sent forth every Methodist preacher in his day, who preached and baptized and ordained, and because every Methodist preacher who has ever been ordained as a Methodist has allegedly been ordained in this direct succession from Erasmus. Nevertheless, some people (notably, Augustus Toplady) doubt or condemn Erasmus's consecration of Wesley. According to The Greek Orthodox Theological Review, Bishop Erasmus of the Diocese of Aracadia also ordained other famous clergymen, including Samson Staniforth, Thomas Bryant, Alexander Mather, among other men, as presbyters:

Our measure from the grace, gift, and power of the all-holy and life-giving Spirit, given by our Saviour Jesus Christ to His divine and holy apostles, to ordain sub-deacons and deacons, and also to advance to the dignity of a priest! Of this grace, which hath descended to our humility, I have ordained sub-deacon and deacon, at Snow Fields Chapel, on the 19th day of November 1764, and at West Street Chapel, on the 24th of the same month, priest, the Rev. Mr. W.C., according to the rules of the holy apostles and of our faith. Moreover, I have given him power to minister and teach, in all the world, the gospel of Jesus Christ, no one forbidding him in the Church of God. Wherefore for that very purpose, I have made this present letter of recommendation from our humility, and have given it to the ordained Mr. W.C. for his certificate and security. —Given and written at London, in Britain, Nov. 24, 1764.

— Erasmus of Arcadia, Certificate presented to W. C. after ordination

The eastern prelate was also well respected in London, by men who had known Erasmus in the Ottoman Empire. Greek Orthodox Christians in Amsterdam attribute Erasmus with establishing Orthodoxy there.
