= Denver Heights =

Denver Heights may refer to:

- Denver Heights, West Virginia, a community in Marshall County
- Denver Heights COGIC, a Pentecostal church in San Antonio, Texas
