= Stephon Ferguson =

Stephon Ferguson is an American motivational speaker, actor and voice over artist best known for recreating the voice of Martin Luther King Jr.

Ferguson is a native of Fayetteville, North Carolina. He joined the U.S. army after completing his high school and served as a sergeant. After serving in the military, he had been associated with radio broadcasting at the show 'on-air gig' at "107.7 The Flava" in Fayetteville during 1993. He was a radio personality and news reporter for fifteen years. Ferguson is known primarily for recreating the voice of Martin Luther king Jr. for his speech 'I have a Dream', which he had delivered in March 1963 in Washington for Jobs and Freedom. He is also known for recreating other speeches of Martin Luther king Jr like 'Letter from Birmingham Jail', 'Mountaintop' etc.

Ferguson is presently working as Associate Minister at Greater Piney Grove Baptist Church in Atlanta, Georgia. He is also associated with Ebenezer Baptist Church, Dr. King's home church, where he conducts historical presentations and interpretive programming for the visitors. He acted in the character of Martin Luther King Jr. in the movie 'The March', a virtual reality film project about Martin Luther King Jr., produced by Time.
