= Church of God in Christ =

Holiness-Pentecostal Christian denomination

- The official seal of the COGIC features a sheaf of wheat representing the members of the COGIC. The rope that holds the shaft together represents Charles Harrison Mason, COGIC's founding father. The rain in the background represents the Latter Rain revivals that gave birth to the Pentecostal movement.
- Classification: Protestant
- Orientation: Pentecostal
- Theology: Holiness Pentecostal
- Polity: Episcopal
- Presiding Bishop: John Drew Sheard Sr.
- Associations: Pentecostal/Charismatic Churches of North America
- Region: Worldwide
- Headquarters: Memphis, Tennessee, U.S.
- Founder: Charles Harrison Mason
- Origin: 1897 (founded) 1907 (incorporated); Memphis, Tennessee
- Separated from: National Baptist Convention, USA
- Separations: Church of Christ (Holiness) U.S.A. (separated 1907), General Council of the Assemblies of God (separated 1914), Church of God in Christ, International (separated 1969)
- Members: 6.5 million
- Official website: www.cogic.org

The Church of God in Christ (COGIC) is an international Holiness–Pentecostal Christian denomination and a large Pentecostal denomination in the United States. Although an international and multi-ethnic religious organization, it has a predominantly African-American membership based within the United States. The international headquarters is in Memphis, Tennessee.

The current Presiding Bishop is John Drew Sheard Sr., who is the senior pastor of the Greater Emmanuel Institutional Church of God in Christ in Detroit, Michigan. He was elected as the denomination's leader on March 27, 2021. On November 12, 2024, Bishop Sheard was re-elected by acclamation to serve another four-year term as the presiding bishop and chief apostle of the denomination.

== Background ==
=== Holiness origins ===
The Church of God in Christ was formed in 1897 by a group of disfellowshipped Baptists, most notably Charles Price Jones (1865–1949) and Charles Harrison Mason (1864–1961). In 1895, Jones and Mason were licensed Baptist ministers in Mississippi who began teaching and preaching the Wesleyan doctrine of Christian perfection (or entire sanctification) as a second work of grace to their Baptist congregations. Mason was influenced by the testimony of the African-American Methodist evangelist Amanda Berry Smith, one of the most widely respected African-American holiness evangelists of the nineteenth century. Her life story led many African-Americans into the Holiness movement, including Mason. He testified that he received entire sanctification after reading her autobiography in 1893.

In June 1896, Jones held a Holiness convention at Mt. Helm Baptist Church in Jackson, Mississippi, attended by Mason and others from several states. Protestant doctrinal debates about Calvinism and Wesleyan perfectionism affected how even local African-American Baptist pastors responded to new Christian movements at the time. Some of these African-American Baptist pastors in local Southern areas such as Mississippi, Tennessee, and Arkansas considered Jones and Mason to be controversial. The leadership of the Mississippi State Convention of the National Baptist Convention, USA, Inc. intervened and expelled Jones, Mason, and others who embraced the Wesleyan teaching of entire sanctification.

In 1897, Mason founded the St. Paul Church in Lexington, Mississippi, as the first church of the new movement. At its first convocation, held in 1897, the group was identified as the "Church of God". Many Holiness Christian groups and fellowships forming at the time wanted biblical names for their local churches and fellowships, such as "Church of God," "Church of Christ," or "Church of the Living God". They rejected denominational names such as "Baptist", "Methodist", or "Episcopal". Since so many new Holiness groups and fellowships were forming that used the name "Church of God", Mason sought a name to distinguish his Holiness group from others.

Later in 1897, while in Little Rock, Arkansas, Mason stated that God had given him the name "Church of God in Christ" for the group. He believed that the name, taken from 1 Thessalonians 2:14, was divinely revealed and biblically inspired. His Holiness fellowship adopted the name Church of God in Christ (COGIC), and began to develop congregations throughout the South. Jones was elected the General Overseer, Mason was selected as Overseer of Tennessee, and J. A. Jeter was selected as Overseer of Arkansas. After testifying to being sanctified, members of the church referred to themselves as "Saints", believing that they were set apart to live a daily life of Christian Holiness in words and deeds.

=== Pentecostal origins ===
By 1906, the church had grown to nearly 100 congregations in three states. Desiring to learn more about the work of the Holy Spirit in the church, Mason, Jeter, and D. J. Young were appointed to a committee by Jones to investigate reports of a revival in Los Angeles, California, that was being led by an itinerant preacher named William J. Seymour. Jones was acquainted with Seymour between 1895 and 1905, as Seymour's travels brought him into contact with many Holiness preachers, including John G. Lake and Martin Wells Knapp. Mason stayed in Los Angeles for five weeks, and his visit to the Azusa Street Revival changed the direction of the newly formed holiness church. During his visit, Mason received baptism with the Holy Spirit; the evidence was believed to be his glossalia, in accordance with the account described in the Christian book of Acts 2:4.

Upon his return to Jackson, Mississippi, Mason faced opposition when he recounted his experience. Not everyone in the church was willing to accept "speaking in tongues" as the initial evidence of baptism of the Holy Ghost. At the general convention held in Jackson in 1907, a split occurred between Jones and other church leaders over such disagreements. After being ejected for accepting his new Pentecostal teachings, Mason called a meeting in Memphis later in the year and reorganized the Church of God in Christ as a Holiness-Pentecostal body. The leaders of the newly formed denomination in 1907 were E. R. Driver, J. Bowe, R. R. Booker, R. E. Hart, W. Welsh, A. A. Blackwell, E. M. Blackwell, E. M. Page, R. H. I. Clark, D. J. Young, James Brewer, Daniel Spearman, and J. H. Boone. The group became the first Pentecostal General Assembly of the Church of God in Christ. They unanimously chose Mason as General Overseer and Chief Apostle. Mason was given authority to lead the new denomination.

In 1907, with 10 congregations, the Church of God in Christ became the first legally chartered Pentecostal body incorporated in the United States. Jones and those Holiness leaders who did not embrace the Azusa Revival experience continued as Holiness churches. In 1915, after years of court litigation over the name of the organization and use of the name "Church of God in Christ" by the two groups; Mason's group was granted the use of the name and Jones's group organized a legally chartered Holiness body called the Church of Christ (Holiness) U.S.A.

== History ==
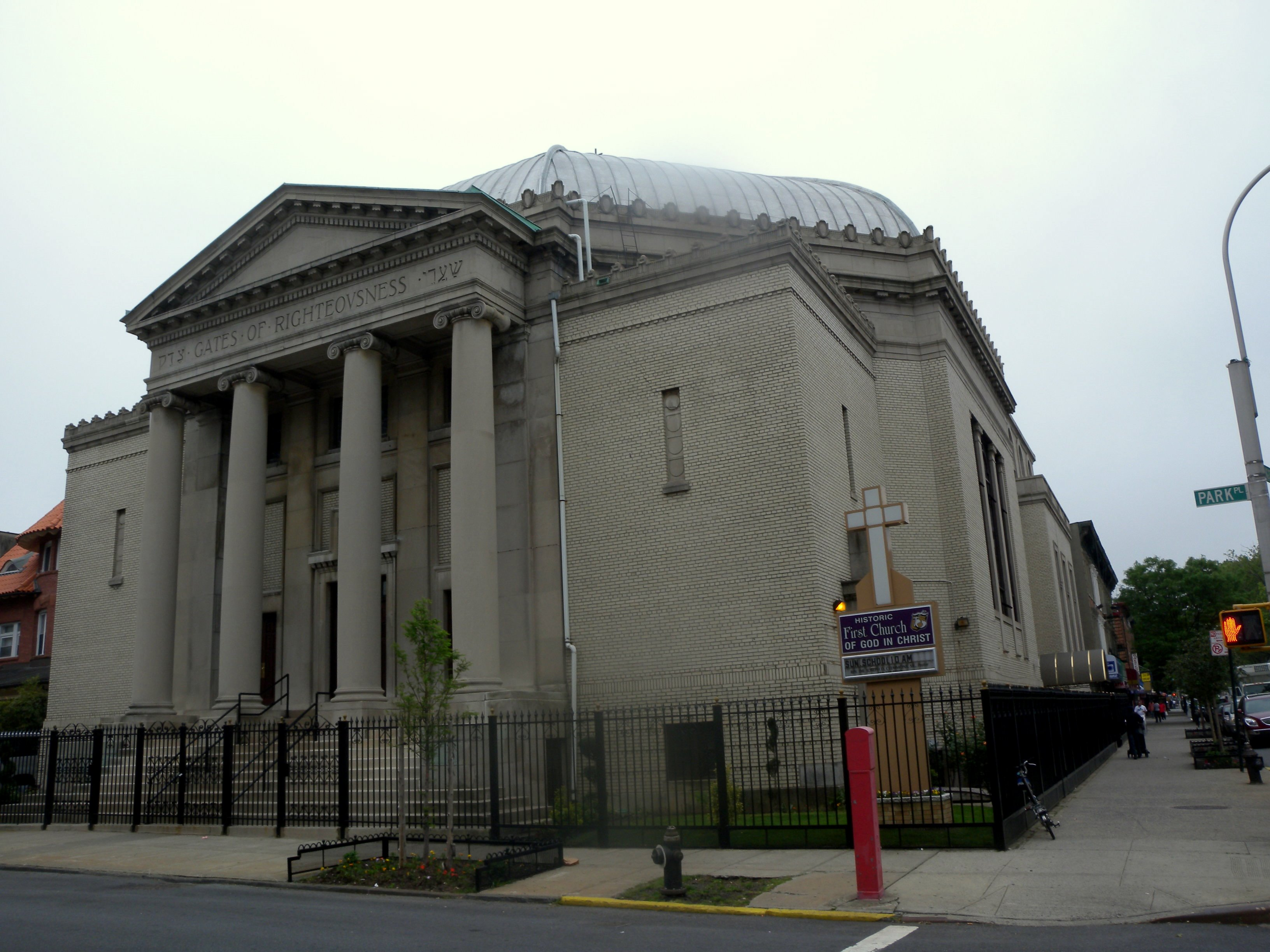
First Church of God in Christ at Park Place and Kingston Avenue in Brooklyn, New York; it took over a former synagogue

=== Bishop C. H. Mason era (1897–1961) ===
After moving to Memphis, Tennessee, Bishop Mason established a local congregation called Temple COGIC. He also established the COGIC national headquarters there. He called for an annual gathering of COGIC members, known as the "International Holy Convocation", to be held in Memphis. Originally, this gathering of the 'Saints' lasted for twenty days, from November 25 to December 14. This seasonal period was selected because most of the COGIC members were farmers and were finished harvesting their crops around this time. COGIC members gathered for praying, fasting, teaching, preaching, fellowship and conducting business related to the national COGIC organization.

COGIC originated among African Americans in the Southern states of Mississippi, Arkansas, and Tennessee. But during the early twentieth century, the Pentecostal movement had rapid growth nationally and attracted racially integrated congregants to its worship services. Mason was pivotal in licensing and credentialing both white and African American ministers, who spread the Pentecostal message and planted new churches. The first general secretary of COGIC was Elder William B. Holt, a white minister. During 1910–1913, two white ministers, Elder H. A. Goss and Elder Leonard P. Adams, were clergy under the authority of C. H. Mason. They were given the authority through a "gentlemen's agreement" to license ministers and establish churches under the COGIC name.

A few years after the Azusa Revival, in 1914, shortly before the United States entered World War I, approximately 300 white ministers, representing a variety of independent churches and networks of churches, including the "Association of Christian Assemblies" of Indiana; and the "Church of God in Christ and in Unity with the Apostolic Faith Movement" from Alabama, Arkansas, Mississippi, and Texas; met in Hot Springs, Arkansas. They determined to separate from COGIC and form what would eventually become the Worldwide Fellowship of the Assemblies of God. There seemed no prospect of an integrated Pentecostal movement under the leadership of an African American such as C. H. Mason. White Americans also, while receiving credentials from COGIC, continued to work along segregated lines; Howard Goss, one of the many white ministers, described the relationship with COGIC as "an association...mainly for purposes of business." (Note: Robeck (2005, II.A.) writes: "On paper, at least, there were over 350 such ministers which made it appear that these white ministers composed roughly half of all Church of God in Christ leadership. What now seems quite apparent is that while these white ministers received ordination from the Church of God in Christ, they continued to function along segregated lines. For them, it was a marriage of convenience, not an integrated fellowship. Howard Goss who negotiated with Mason for the ability to sign these credentials would later label it 'an association...mainly for purposes of business.' But was it only a business proposition for Mason?") The organizers of the meeting in Hot Springs had sent invitations only to white ministers to discuss a new movement, although racial and ethnic minorities did attend.

The Howard A. Goss faction left COGIC to join the Assemblies of God USA. Over time, the ministers and churches under Leonard P. Adams also separated from COGIC; they assimilated into other white Pentecostal groups or organizations. In 1916, a few white churches were organized as a white branch of COGIC. William B. Holt was appointed as General Superintendent. The racial climate in the post WWI years, when there was high competition for jobs and housing and violent unrest in many cities in 1919, would not sustain this relationship. It ultimately ended by 1930, when the Depression set in.

Mason continued to travel across the nation preaching and establishing COGIC churches. As African Americans migrated north and west to industrial cities during the Great Migration, he began to establish COGIC churches in the north and, especially after 1940, in the west. Mason sent ministers and evangelists to cities and urban areas outside the South, including William Roberts (Chicago), O. M. Kelly (New York), O. T. Jones Sr. (Philadelphia), E. R. Driver (Los Angeles), and Samuel Kelsey (Washington, D.C.) From these major cities, COGIC spread throughout the country.

In 1926, Mason authorized the church's constitution, outlining the bylaws, rules, and regulations of the church. In 1933, he set apart five overseers to the Office of Bishop in the church, the first five bishops of COGIC.

The first national tabernacle was built and completed in 1925. It was destroyed by fire in 1936. In 1945, Mason dedicated Mason Temple in Memphis as the church's national meeting site. Built in the 1940s during World War II, the nearly 4000-seat building was the largest church auditorium of any African American religious group in the United States.

In 1951, when Mason was approaching 85 years of age, he set up a "special commission" to help with the administration and oversight of the church. On June 5, 1951, he selected Bishops A. B. McEwen, J. S. Bailey, and O. M. Kelly as his assistants. On May 19, 1952, he added Bishop J. O. Patterson Sr. Also in 1952, Mason revised the constitution to determine the leadership and succession of the church after his death. On October 12, 1955, Mason added three bishops to the commission: U. E. Miller, S. M. Crouch, and O. T. Jones Sr. This group of seven bishops became known officially as the Executive Commission, which took on greater responsibility over church affairs until Mason's death.

In 1907, there were ten COGIC churches, but by the time of Mason's death in 1961, COGIC had spread to every state in the United States and to many foreign countries. It had a membership of more than 400,000, who supported more than 4,000 churches.

=== Bishop O.T. Jones Sr. era (1962–1968) ===
The years of 1962–1968 has been described as a "Dark Period" in the history of the Church of God in Christ, because there was polarization and conflict in leadership following the death of the founder. After Mason's death, in accordance with the 1952 church constitution, the control of the church reverted to the COGIC Board of Bishops. However, the General Assembly vested authority in the executive board composed of the seven bishops selected by Mason before his death. The COGIC constitution at the time did not identify a clear successor or the authority of the executive board after Mason's death. A. B. McEwen was elected chairman of the executive board, and O.T. Jones Sr. was elected Senior Bishop by the General Assembly.

Bishop Ozro Thurston Jones Sr. was pastor of the Holy Temple Church of God in Christ in Philadelphia and the Jurisdictional Bishop of the Commonwealth of Pennsylvania Jurisdiction. Jones was the only living bishop of the five original bishops consecrated by Mason. After Mason's death, Jones assumed leadership as Senior Bishop of the Church of God in Christ. In 1964 however, disagreement between the authority of the Senior Bishop and the executive board, led by A. B. McEwen, came to a head and was addressed at the 57th Holy Convocation. Factions developed within the organization as both Jones and McEwen made conflicting administrative and executive decisions.

The parties filed lawsuits in the Chancery Court of Shelby County, Tennessee, to resolve the legitimate authority of the denomination. The court ordered the church to convene a constitutional convention in February 1968. The constitutional convention drafted and approved a new constitution which dissolved both the office of the Senior Bishop and the executive board; it also established the General Assembly, which meets biannually, as the supreme authority over the church to decide matters of faith and practice. Furthermore, the new constitution created the office of the presiding bishop and a general board of twelve bishops and defined their responsibilities. The presiding bishop and all twelve members of the general board are to be elected every four years and preside over the church when the General Assembly is not in session. On November 14, 1968, the General Assembly of the COGIC elected the first general board and presiding bishop of the church.

==== First general board 1968–1972 ====
- Bishop J. O. Patterson Sr. – presiding bishop
- Bishop J. S. Bailey – first assistant presiding bishop
- Bishop S. M. Crouch – second assistant presiding bishop
- Bishop W. N. Wells
- Bishop L. H. Ford
- Bishop O. M. Kelly
- Bishop C. E. Bennett
- Bishop J. A. Blake
- Bishop J. W. White
- Bishop D. L. Williams
- Bishop F. D. Washington
- Bishop J. D. Husband

Several bishops disagreed with the new organizational structure; they severed ties with COGIC to start their own organizations. The most notable rift occurred in 1969, when fourteen bishops met in Evanston, Illinois, to form the Church of God in Christ, International. They disagreed in having an electoral process to select the presiding bishop. Another body operating under the same name Church of God in Christ, International, split and organized in the Northeast area under Bishop R. T. Jones of Philadelphia and later Bishop C. E. Williams Sr. of Brooklyn, New York City.

After the office of Senior Bishop was abolished, O. T. Jones Sr. remained in the denomination as Jurisdictional Bishop of the Commonwealth of Pennsylvania until his death in 1972. COGIC continued to grow and in 1973, the church claimed a worldwide membership of nearly three million.

=== Bishop J. O. Patterson era (1968–1989) ===
Bishop James Oglethorpe Patterson Sr. was elected in November 1968 as the first presiding bishop of the church by the General Assembly at the denomination's 61st Holy Convocation, and at the age of 56 is the youngest person elected to the office. The son-in-law of C. H. Mason, Patterson had served the church previously as a member of the executive board and as executive secretary. He was pastor of the Pentecostal Temple Institutional COGIC in Memphis, Tennessee, and was Presiding Prelate of the Tennessee Headquarters Jurisdiction. Patterson established protocols of worship, policy and practices. A new constitution and official manual of the church were completed in 1973. COGIC became a major force in the collective Black Church and worldwide Pentecostal movement. It has had rapid growth in many regions as one of the fastest-growing and largest religious groups in the United States.

As the first elected presiding bishop, Patterson established the Charles Harrison Mason Seminary in Atlanta, Georgia.

In 1982, Patterson led COGIC in its Diamond Jubilee, in a celebration of the International Holy Convocation. He established the World Fellowship of Black Pentecostal Churches and gained COGIC membership in the Congress of National Black Churches. His dream was to establish an international ministry complex known as "Saints Center" and an accredited institution known as "All Saints University". He was elected four times uncontested as presiding bishop. He consecrated and appointed more than 100 bishops during his twenty-one years of leadership.

=== Bishop L. H. Ford era (1990–1995) ===
Bishop Louis Henry Ford of Chicago, Illinois, was elected after the death of J. O. Patterson Sr. in 1989. Ford was pastor of the St. Paul COGIC in Chicago and was Presiding Prelate of the Historic Illinois First Jurisdiction. He was a strong advocate for social justice. He became nationally recognized in 1955 for officiating at the funeral of 15-year-old Emmett Till, who was brutally murdered in Mississippi. He gave the eulogy for Till at Robert's Temple COGIC in 1955.

Ford also renovated several COGIC structures in Memphis, including Mason Temple. Ford is credited with inviting President Bill Clinton, a personal friend, to speak to the Eighty-Sixth International Holy Convocation on November 13, 1993. Clinton is the only US president to have addressed a COGIC convocation at Mason Temple.

=== Bishop C. D. Owens era (1995–2000) ===
Bishop Chandler David Owens Sr. was elected Presiding Bishop after the death of L. H. Ford in 1995. C. D. Owens had gained national attention in the church as the president of the Youth Department. He was a noted evangelist who had pastored several churches, including: Bostick Temple in St. Louis, Missouri; Well's Cathedral COGIC in Newark, New Jersey; and Greater Community COGIC in Marietta, Georgia. He also served as the Presiding Prelate of the New Jersey Garden State Jurisdiction and the Central Georgia Jurisdiction. Owens led the COGIC in its centennial celebration in 1997 with the theme, "Holiness, a Proven Foundation for a Promising Future!" He is credited with systematically restructuring church departments and ministries, expanding the church in Asia, primarily India and the Philippines, and placing the COGIC on a solid financial status. Owens outlined a progressive plan to position the COGIC for ministry in the twenty-first century, known as "Vision 2000 and Beyond". In 2000 at the Ninety-Third International Holy Convocation, the COGIC General Assembly elected Gilbert Earl Patterson to replace Owens as Presiding Bishop. Owens continued to serve as a jurisdictional bishop and member of the General Board until his death in 2011.

=== Bishop G. E. Patterson era (2000–2007) ===
Bishop Gilbert Earl Patterson began his ministry as co-pastor of the Holy Temple COGIC with his father, Bishop W. A. Patterson. In 1975, he resigned as co-pastor, withdrawing his membership in COGIC following leadership disagreements with then Presiding Bishop J. O. Patterson Sr. concerning establishing another jurisdiction in Memphis, to which J. O. Patterson was opposed. G. E. Patterson established the Temple of Deliverance, the Cathedral of Bountiful Blessing which grew to become the largest Pentecostal church in Memphis with over 14,000 members. In 1988, after a thirteen-year exodus from COGIC, G. E. Patterson returned as the founding Prelate of the newly formed Tennessee Fourth Jurisdiction. In 2000, he was elected as the Presiding Bishop of COGIC. Patterson was the second youngest person to ever be elected Presiding Bishop of COGIC at the age 60 in 2000, second to his uncle, J. O. Patterson Sr. who was 56 when he was elected Presiding Bishop in 1968. He re-ignited the church to be a flagship Pentecostal denomination. He was able to bridge denominational barriers and encourage non-COGIC ministries to work collboratively with the denomination. He established COGIC Charities which has provided thousands of dollars in college scholarships and disaster relief efforts such as Hurricanes Katrina and Rita.

=== Bishop C. E. Blake Era (2007–2021) ===
Bishop Charles E. Blake assumed leadership and was elected Presiding Bishop of the church following G.E. Patterson's death in March 2007. Blake is the senior pastor of the West Angeles Cathedral COGIC in Los Angeles. For many years, West Angeles has been one of the fastest growing churches in the United States and remains the largest COGIC local congregation with a membership of 25,000. Blake served as the Presiding Prelate of the First Jurisdiction of Southern California. Blake led COGIC through the death of G. E. Patterson while preparing the church for its 100th Holy Convocation; an important milestone for the church. Blake led the COGIC to become a greater global ministry, primarily in Africa and Latin America, while at the same time investing in the inner cities where many COGIC congregations are located. He is also known for his aggressive initiative, "Save Africa's Children" which supports hundreds of African children who have been affected by HIV/AIDS in orphanages in several countries in Africa. In 2009, Blake unveiled an aggressive program known as "Urban Initiatives" to address the plight of America's urban areas. In 2010, Blake led more than 50,000 delegates to the 103rd International Holy Convocation to St. Louis, Missouri. In April 2018, Blake led COGIC in partnership with American Federation of State, County and Municipal Employees (AFSCME) to commemorate the 50th anniversary of the assassination of Martin Luther King Jr. in Memphis to continue to struggle for civil rights in the 21st century. On October 23, 2020, Blake announced that he will not seek a re-election as Presiding Bishop nor as a member of the General Board and that he would retire from the Office of Presiding Bishop and from the General Board in 2021.

=== Bishop J. D. Sheard era (2021–present) ===
Bishop John Drew Sheard Sr., who had previously been elected to the General Board in 2012 and 2016, was reelected to the General Board and subsequently elected as the current Presiding Bishop on March 20, 2021, in the first-ever virtual online election for the denomination.

In his first year as Presiding Bishop in 2021, in order to combat debt that the church had accrued from previous years, Sheard helped to launch the "I Love My Church" Initiative, which was a massive fundraising campaign that helped the COGIC denomination to pay off much of its debts, renovate and refurbish its headquarters church, Mason Temple, establish housing complexes for low-income families throughout Shelby County, Tennessee near the church's headquarters, and purchased a former Catholic nunnery convent in Memphis to provide housing for single mothers affected by health challenges, disabilities, teen pregnancies, and domestic violence.

== Statistics ==
The National Council of Churches ranks COGIC as the fifth largest Christian denomination in the U.S. COGIC is a Holiness–Pentecostal Christian denomination, with a predominantly African American membership. In 2010, According to the US Religious Census, COGIC in the United States had 624,419 members in 2,966 churches. According to a 2015 statistical study by the Pew Research Center, the denomination was estimated to have a United States membership of approximately 84% African Americans, 5% White Americans, 8% Latino-Americans, and roughly 2% Asian-Americans. In 2016, the church had 5.5 million members in 60 countries around the world. In 2022, it was present in 112 countries.

=== Statistics Conflict ===
The Church of God in Christ has not shared official statistics with the public as the website states millions of adherents. This has led to multiple different figures for church membership being declared. For an example, some have stated over 5,000,000 members in the United States. This would place them as the fifth largest Christian denomination in the U.S. and the largest Pentecostal denomination in the nation. In 2020, ARDA's U.S. Religious Survey has placed the Church of God in Christ at 920,429 members in 3,313 churches. In the case of ARDA's figures, this would place the Church of God in Christ behind other Pentecostal groups in the U.S.

== Theology and beliefs ==
COGIC is a Trinitarian Holiness Pentecostal denomination. The church teaches three separate and distinct works of grace that God performs in the life of believers: salvation, entire sanctification, and the baptism or infilling of the Holy Ghost. The church declares to be evangelical in ministry, fundamentalist in doctrine and practice and Pentecostal in worship and expression. COGIC theology and beliefs fall in the tradition of Wesleyan-Arminian theology.

=== Statement of faith ===
The beliefs of the Church of God in Christ are briefly written in its Statement of Faith, which is reproduced below: It is often recited in various congregations as part of the order of worship and all national and international convocations.

- We believe the Bible to be the inspired and only infallible written Word of God.
- We believe that there is One God, eternally existent in three persons, God the Father, God the Son, and God the Holy Spirit.
- We believe in the Blessed Hope, which is the rapture of the Church of God, which is in Christ, at His return.
- We believe that the only means of being cleansed from sin is through repentance and faith in the precious Blood of Jesus Christ.
- We believe that the regeneration by the Holy Ghost is absolutely essential for personal salvation.
- We believe that the redemptive work of Christ on the Cross provides healing for the human body in answer to believing prayer.
- We believe that the Baptism of the Holy Ghost, according to Acts 2:4, is given to believers who ask for it.
- We believe in the sanctifying power of the Holy Spirit, by whose indwelling a Christian is enabled to live a holy and separated life in the present world. Amen

=== Doctrine ===
According to the Articles of Religion in the COGIC Official Manual, COGIC believes in biblical inspiration and holds that the Bible is the supreme and final authority for doctrine and practice. There is one God eternally existent in three persons: Father, Son, and Holy Spirit. COGIC teaches the deity of Jesus Christ, his virgin birth, sinless life, physical death, burial, resurrection, ascension and visible return to the earth. Christ is the Head of the church, and He is the only mediator between God and humanity, and there is no salvation in any other. COGIC teaches that the Holy Spirit is alive and active in the world. The Holy Spirit is the agent that equips, empowers, leads, and guides the church until the return of Christ.

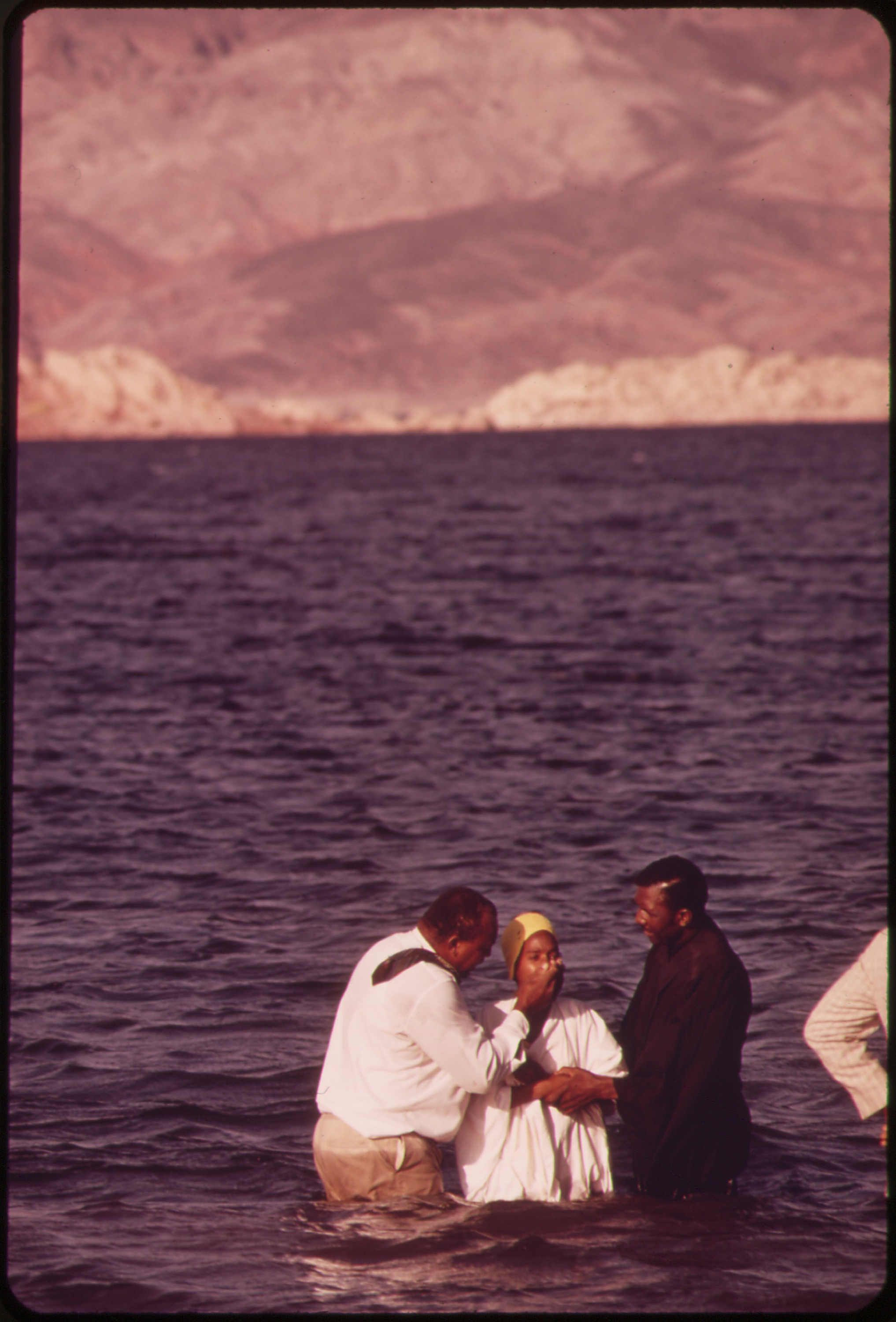
Baptism performed in Lake Mead in 1972 by members of the North Las Vegas Church of God in Christ

COGIC teaches that angels are messengers sent from God who served during the creation, throughout the Old Testament, the life and ministry of Jesus Christ, the establishment of the church and the ministry of the apostles, and continue to be at work in the Kingdom of God. They exist primarily in the spiritual realm and are organized according to duty and function. Demons exist as manifestation of evil or unclean spirits. They are fallen angels who joined Satan in his failed attempt to usurp power in Heaven. They exist today as adversaries to the kingdom, purpose and will of God. As Pentecostals, the church believes that demons can be subdued and subjugated through the power of the Holy Spirit in the name of Jesus Christ.

COGIC teaches that man was created in the image of God as a tripartite being having a body, soul, and spirit. Through the cleansing of sins can you live a perfect life free from sin. Sin originated in eternity when Satan committed open rebellion against God in heaven. Sin was transmitted to humanity when Adam and Eve ate of the forbidden fruit in the Garden of Eden, as a result all men have original sin. The result of sin is the depravity of man, broken communion with God, shame and guilt, and physical and spiritual death. Humanity can only be restored through salvation offered only through Jesus Christ. The human soul is immortal and will spend eternity either in heaven as the redeemed or in hell as the damned.

COGIC teaches that salvation is the work of redemption to the sinner and his restoration to divine favor and communion with God. Salvation is an operation of the Holy Spirit upon sinners brought about by repentance toward God, which brings about conversion, faith, justification, and regeneration. It teaches that salvation is a work of grace brought about through faith in Jesus Christ; it does not promulgate nor encourage the doctrine of eternal security, also known as "once saved, always saved."

COGIC teaches that sanctification is a continuous operation of the Holy Spirit, by which he "delivers the justified sinner from the pollution of sin, renews his whole nature in the image of God and enables him to perform good works". It is a separate and distinct work of grace that occurs in the lives of believers after conversion. It teaches that sanctification should precede the baptism with the Holy Spirit.

COGIC teaches that the baptism of the Holy Ghost or Holy Spirit is an experience subsequent to conversion and sanctification, can be experienced by all believers who ask for it. As a Pentecostal church, COGIC teaches that when one is baptized in the Holy Spirit, the believer will experience an initial evidence of speaking in tongues (glossolalia) by the will of God. COGIC does not teach that Spirit baptism is the same as salvation. According to the Articles of Religion, "We believe that we are not baptized with the Holy Ghost in order to be saved, but that we are baptized with the Holy Ghost because we are saved". COGIC also teaches that all the spiritual gifts are for believers today.

COGIC teaches that the church is the community of Christian believers who have accepted Jesus Christ and submit to his Lordship and authority in their lives. It can be spoken of as the individual and the collective, physical and spiritual. It includes not only those who are members of COGIC, but all believers who have placed their faith in the Lord Jesus Christ. COGIC teaches that according to the Word of God, there will be final events and conditions that address the end of this present age of the world. These events include physical death, the intermediate state, bodily resurrection, the Second Coming of Christ, the Great Tribulation, the Battle of Armageddon, the Millennial Reign, the Final Judgment, the future of the wicked in hell, and life for the redeemed in heaven.

COGIC believes in divine healing, however, it does not advocate the exclusion of medical supervision. It believes that the gifts of the Spirit are given to believers and are active in the church today. The ordinances of the church are water baptism by immersion, the Lord's Supper and foot washing. The church does not practice infant baptisms or christenings, but does conduct baby dedications in formal ceremonies.

=== Distinctives ===
As a classical Holiness Pentecostal denomination, COGIC continues to embrace its holiness heritage, teaching modesty in dress, appearance, moderate participation in secular entertainment and prohibitions against profanity, alcohol, substance abuse and immoral behavior. The church has a tradition of prayer, fasting, praise, and consecration that was once unique to Holiness or Holiness Pentecostal groups. Many mainline denominations and countless nondenominational churches that once rejected these beliefs and practices have adopted these distinctions in their worship liturgy and lifestyle practices.

==== Abortion ====
COGIC has always been traditionally anti-abortion. The denomination teaches that God gives life to human beings, biologically and spiritually, through the moment of conception in the womb of the mother, using Jeremiah 1:5, Genesis 1:26–27, and Psalms 139:13–16 as their scriptural basis for this belief. COGIC teaches that because God uses conception through and after sexual reproduction and intercourse to create human life, that willfully aborting a human fetus is contrary to God's Word and Christian ethics, and it is considered to be a sin against God and the Bible within the denomination. However, the Church believes that in some extreme or rare cases, medical and operational abortion may be the safest way to help the mother if the pregnancy is jeopardizing the mother's life and health. COGIC believes, though, that even then in the case of saving the life of the mother, that abortion should still only be considered as a last resort, if all other options to help the mother and the unborn fetus have been thoroughly exhausted. COGIC believes "that if such a case arises, the mother should pray and seek the wisdom and guidance of God and the Holy Spirit on whether or not they should resort to emergency abortion if it is necessary to save her life," but if not, the Church traditionally encourages expecting mothers to "seek God's guidance for other options and choices regarding their unborn child so that they do not have to choose aborting it, and can safely go through with their pregnancy until childbirth." COGIC also encourages mothers that if they know they will not be able to provide proper care to their child, they should seek assistance to give the child up for either private adoption, legal adoption through domestic or international adoption agencies, or foster care.

In July 2016 during their annual Auxiliaries in Ministries convention, COGIC announced their Urban Initiative Outreach ministries and Missions and Charity departments would be partnering up with The Human Coalition, an anti-abortion advocacy group, from 2016 to 2019 for a three-year initiative to encourage COGIC pastors and ministers to encourage anti-abortion advocacy in their local churches. The three-year initiative would also help encourage COGIC clergy to use their missions and charity ministries in local churches to help offer aid and assistance to African Americans and people of other ethnic minorities, and people of low incomes in local communities who are considering and contemplating abortion and offer aid and assistance to people dealing with economic and medical issues from pregnancy. The three-year-initiative with The Human Coalition was also supposed to encourage local COGIC clergy leaders across the United States, both male and female, to partner up with other anti-abortion advocacy groups and Christian ministries to lobby for more anti-abortion restrictions throughout local states.

==== Civil rights ====
Organized in the South and having a predominately African American membership, COGIC has had a long history in advancing civil rights. Pentecostals have been criticized because of their noticeable absence from the official record of activism that has been largely overshadowed by black ministers of other denominations such as Baptists and Methodists; however, there is evidence to verify and document the role and response of COGIC ministers and other Pentecostal denominations to the cause and struggle for Civil Rights in the United States during the 20th Century.

As previously stated, COGIC although predominately black, had a significant white membership during its first decade of existence, with a number of white ministers holding leadership positions in the church. However, after a meeting in Hot Springs, Arkansas, that led to the founding of the Assemblies of God, the white constituency of COGIC continued to decline, until it was almost nonexistent by the 1930s. During World War I, the FBI opened a file on Bishop Mason and conducted surveillance on him because of his pacifism during the war. Bishop Mason taught COGIC members against going to war, but more so he was against African American men being called to fight a war overseas for freedom and then coming home and being treated as second-class citizens and being lynched, even in their uniforms, because of racism.

During the 1940s and 50s, Bishop Mason often invited the white elected officials of the city of Memphis to the International Holy Convocation on Civic Night. Overseer E.R. Driver, who was the overseer of California and pastor of the Saints Home COGIC led an interracial congregation made up of many Blacks, Whites, and Latinos, for many years. However, his out-spoken criticism of the racial prejudice and discrimination of whites led most, if not all of them, to leave his church for other ministries where the message against racism was not so obvious and offensive to them. During the 1930s and 1940s, a white COGIC elder named James L. Delk who remained in the church after many whites had left, was very active in politics in Missouri and worked to promote civil rights by writing legislatures and petitioning the federal government on the behalf of COGIC. He is credited with helping to secure the steel needed to construct Mason Temple which was virtually impossible during World War II.

During the 1950s and 60s, during the height of the civil rights movement, COGIC ministers and congregations played host to many significant events. In 1955, Emmett Till's funeral was held at Robert's Temple Church Of God in Christ in Chicago, Illinois. Mamie Till-Mobley was a member of St. Paul COGIC led by then Elder Louis Henry Ford (who would later become the presiding bishop of the denomination) officiated the service. In Chicago, Ford organized voter registration initiatives. He protested during the 1950s and 1960s against lodging segregation in Memphis, while participating in COGIC Holy Convocations there during the Civil Rights era before federal laws prohibiting such segregation.

Medger Evers, the famed NAACP Field representative for the state of Mississippi who was gunned down in the front of his house in 1963 was raised in by his mother as a member of COGIC before later becoming a Baptist. On February 21, 1965, when Malcolm X was assassinated and the family needed a place for his funeral, no major black church or facility would open their doors for the service. COGIC Bishop Alvin A. Childs of the Faith Temple Church of God in Christ (later renamed Child's Memorial in his honor) was the clergyman who finally opened his doors. According to Alex Haley, "He and his wife then received bomb threats at home and at church." Malcolm X's Funeral was held in Harlem, New York City at Faith Temple Church Of God in Christ.

In 1965, during the March to Selma, a young COGIC minister, Charles E. Blake (previous COGIC Presiding Bishop), was studying at the Interdenominational Theological Center (ITC) in Atlanta, GA. He led a group of students to participate in the March on Selma. In 1968, Two sanitation workers who were also COGIC members, Echol Cole and Robert Walker, were crushed to death in a garbage compactor where they were taking shelter from the rain. Their pastor was then elder Gilbert Earl Patterson, who also became a COGIC Presiding Bishop, at Holy Temple COGIC in Memphis, Tennessee. He was one of the nine members of the strategy committee that organized the sanitation strike in Memphis. Holy Temple COGIC was the first church to open its doors to the garbage workers. On April 3, 1968, Martin Luther King Jr. delivered his "I've Been To The Mountaintop" speech, at Mason Temple Church Of God in Christ in Memphis. He was assassinated the next day, on the balcony of the Lorraine Motel.

Throughout the 1970s and 80s, as COGIC continued to grow to millions of members nationwide, COGIC ministers all over the country continued to advance civil rights in their communities. As the International Holy Convocation grew to thousands, COGIC leaders had to negotiate with city officials to provide hotel accommodations for the saints. Rev. Al Sharpton, a noted civil rights activist, began his ministerial career as a minister in COGIC. His pastor and mentor was Bishop F. D. Washington of Brooklyn, New York. In 1984 and 1988 respectively, Rev. Jesse Jackson was invited to speak during the COGIC International Holy Convocation when he was running for the presidency. During the 1990s, President Bill Clinton was invited by then COGIC Presiding Bishop, Louis Henry Ford to attend the International Holy Convocation. President Clinton gave speeches at COGIC meetings including the International Holy Convocation at Mason Temple and the Women's International Convention.

At the start of the new millennium, then COGIC presiding Bishop Gilbert Earl Patterson, continued to support the advancement of civil rights. During the current administration of Presiding Bishop Charles Blake, COGIC unveiled its Urban Initiatives Program to provide 60,000 programs nationwide through its more than 12,000 congregations to continue to promote the work of civil rights, and to reduce poverty, crime and violence, etc. In April 2018, Presiding Bishop Charles Blake along with Lee Saunders, Andrew Young, DeMaurice Smith, and Brian Dunn coordinated the "I AM 2018 Mountaintop Conference" at the historic Mason Temple in Memphis to commemorate the fiftieth anniversary of the assassination of Martin Luther King Jr.

Since Bishop J. Drew Sheard assumed the role of Presiding Bishop of the Church of God in Christ (COGIC) in 2021, the denomination has significantly expanded its engagement in civil rights and social justice initiatives. A pivotal development was the establishment of the Social Justice Ministry, with Bishop Talbert W. Swan II appointed as its inaugural National Director. Under their leadership, COGIC has intensified its efforts to address systemic injustices and advocate for marginalized communities.

==== Strengthening Civil Rights Engagement ====
In February 2025, Bishop Sheard was elected to the National Board of Directors of the NAACP, marking the first time a COGIC leader has held such a position. This appointment underscores COGIC's commitment to civil rights and its alignment with organizations dedicated to social equity.

==== Expanding the Social Justice Ministry ====
Bishop Swan, a seasoned civil rights advocate and current Prelate of the Greater Vermont Ecclesiastical Jurisdiction, has leveraged his extensive experience to advance COGIC's social justice agenda. His initiatives have focused on police reform, voting rights, and community empowerment. Notably, in 2024, he was appointed national chairperson of "COGIC Counts", a voter mobilization campaign aimed at maximizing electoral participation among congregants.

Through these concerted efforts, COGIC, under the leadership of Bishops Sheard and Swan, continues to play a vital role in advocating for civil rights and social justice, reinforcing its historical legacy in these domains.

==== Marriage and sexuality ====
COGIC believes marriage is a monogamous sacred, civil, and legal union between a husband and wife that is recognized as a covenant between them and God for the purpose of the couple being a helpmate to each other and raising a family together. COGIC clergy are also allowed to be married. Remarriage is usually highly discouraged, except in the case of the death of a spouse or former spouse. Divorce is considered inconsistent with biblical teachings and is highly discouraged as well, but exceptions are made for special circumstances. COGIC considers any physical, sexual relationship outside of the sanctity of marriage to be outside of the sovereign will of God and unbiblical. COGIC clergy do not officially sanction or recognize same-sex relationships to be united in marriage and the denomination at-large discourages same-sex relationships as unbiblical and immoral. COGIC regards homosexuality and infidelity as immoral and views aspects of sexual behavior and sexuality that do not agree with Biblical scripture as sinful. COGIC policies and bylaws have also been established regarding sexual misconduct of COGIC clergy and laymembers for disciplinary purposes. COGIC clergy are also encouraged to have a certain degree of training in marriage counseling as well.

A 2014 statistical study from the Pew Research Center Forum on Religion & Public Life, reported that most members of COGIC usually got married between the ages of 25 and 30, and that over 42% of COGIC members between the ages of 25 and 65+ were married, at least 19% were divorced or separated, 32% were never married, and at least 5% were widowed. The study also found that over 70% of COGIC members overwhelmingly opposed the legalizing of same-sex marriage and considered relationships from infidelity, polygamy, polyamory, and sex outside of marriage as sinful and unbiblical as well.

=== Ecumenism ===
The COGIC has always had a long history with Christian ecumenism, partnering up with and collaborating with other Christian churches and denominations for the purposes of advancing ministry and charity efforts, both in the United States, and globally in foreign countries as well.

When the COGIC was first founded by Bishop Mason in the 1910s, he wanted the denomination to have ecumenical relationships with other predominantly Black Methodist and Baptist churches, but many of them were unwilling to do so at the time because of Mason's controversial history with being expelled from his former Baptist ministry associations and churches in Mississippi for preaching sanctification and Pentecostalism. At the time, because many churches disagreed with what they considered its eccentric worship styles and expressions of Pentecostalism, such as the Baptism of the Holy Spirit and speaking in tongues and the laying on of hands, many churches distanced themselves from the COGIC for many years.

Nevertheless, as time progressed in the 1950s and 60s, and as COGIC began to grow and became increasingly institutionalized as a denomination, several other churches and denominations began partnering up with COGIC's leaders to help advance the cause of Civil Rights for African Americans, most notably such as the National Baptist Convention, the African Methodist Episcopal Church, the African Methodist Episcopal Zion Church, and many other similar predominantly Black denominations as well.

During the tenure of Bishop J. O. Patterson Sr. as Presiding Bishop in the 1970s and 80s, Bishop Patterson established several interdenominational Christian schools and seminaries, and helped to establish the World Fellowship of Black Pentecostal Churches and gained COGIC membership in the Congress of National Black Churches as well, a national caucus of Black church denominations that represent different denominations and organizations of the Black Church in America. During the tenure of Bishop L. H. Ford as Presiding Bishop in the 1990s, he helped gain COGIC membership into the Pentecostal/Charismatic Churches of North America, a more diverse, international caucus of different Pentecostal church denominations and organizations that sought to heal the racial divides in the North American Pentecostal movement.

During the tenure of Bishop G.E. Patterson, the nephew of the above-mentioned Bishop J.O. Patterson, as Presiding Bishop of the Church in the 2000s, he helped bridge denominational barriers and encouraged non-COGIC ministries and denominations to work collaboratively with the COGIC denomination to help support charity efforts for poor and disadvantaged African Americans and people affected by poverty and disasters in foreign countries through the COGIC Charities Department and the COGIC Missions and Evangelism Department.

Bishop Charles E. Blake, as the Presiding Bishop of the COGIC from the late 2000s up to the 2010s, was also dedicated to increasing and maintaining stable ecumenical relationships from the COGIC with other diverse Christian denominations, most notably Pentecostal/Charismatic churches, Baptist churches, African Methodist Episcopal (A.M.E.) Churches, and A.M.E. Zion churches, and even some non-denominational Christian ministries for the purposes of ministry efforts and collaborating on addressing social issues that affect Christians and specifically the Black Church in America, most notably through his Urban Initiatives program.

== Polity and government ==
According to its 1973 Constitution, the church has two structures to govern the church: civil and ecclesiastical. The civil structure of the Church of God in Christ includes a president, first vice-president, second vice-president, general secretary, general treasurer, and the financial secretary. All officers are elected by the General Assembly. The general secretary, general treasurer, and financial secretary terms run concurrent with the current presidential administration that is elected every four years.

=== Corporate structure ===
==== General officers ====
- Presiding Bishop – Bishop J. Drew Sheard, Michigan
- 1st Assistant Presiding Bishop – Bishop Jerry W. Macklin, California
- 2nd Assistant Presiding Bishop – Bishop Lawrence M. Wooten, Missouri
- General Secretary – Bishop Robert G. Rudolph Jr., Arkansas
- General Treasurer – Bishop Charles Harrison Mason Patterson Sr., Tennessee
- Financial Secretary – Bishop Michael B. Golden Jr., Virginia
- Chairman of the General Assembly – Bishop Lemuel F. Thuston, Kansas

The legislative authority of the church is vested in a general assembly, composed of the members of the general board, jurisdictional/auxiliary bishops, jurisdictional supervisors, chaplains, pastors, ordained elders, four district missionaries and six lay members from each jurisdiction. The general assembly elects a 12-person general board (presidium) every four years from the college of bishops, who serve functionally as executive directors and administrators of the church. The general assembly meets biannually each year in April and November while the presidium acts as the executive branch of the church, overseeing the day-to-day operation when the general assembly is not in session. As a result, the general board exercises great authority over the church. The presidium includes a separately elected international presiding bishop by the general assembly who serves a term of four years, who, then appoints two assistant presiding bishops. The current presiding bishop is Bishop J. Drew Sheard who was elected in 2021.

National officers of the church are chosen at the general assembly every four years unless special elections are warranted. The judicial board serves as the judicial branch and is the supreme body that interprets polity and practice. It has nine members, elected by the general assembly, including three bishops, three elders, and three lay members.

==== Members of the General Board (2024–present) ====
- Bishop J. Drew Sheard Sr. – Presiding Bishop (2021–present) and board member (2012–present), Michigan
- Bishop Jerry W. Macklin – First Assistant Presiding Bishop (2021–present) and board member (2004–present), California
- Bishop Lawrence M. Wooten – Second Assistant Presiding Bishop (2021–present) and board member (2012–present), Missouri
- Bishop Brandon B. Porter – Secretary to the General Board (2021–present) and board member (2012–present), Tennessee
- Bishop Michael E. Hill – Assistant Secretary to the General Board (2021–present) and board member (2021–present), Michigan
- Bishop Darrell L. Hines – Board member (2016–present), Wisconsin
- Bishop Prince E. W. Bryant Sr. – Board member (2021–present), Texas
- Bishop Charles H. McClelland – Board member (2021–present), Wisconsin
- Bishop Elijah Hankerson, III – Board member (2021–present), Missouri
- Bishop Jerry L. Maynard – Board Member (2024 – present), Tennessee
- Bishop Linwood E. Dillard Jr. – Board member (2024–present), Tennessee
- Bishop Frank A. White – Board member (2024–present), New York

==== Emeritus members of the General Board ====
- Bishop Charles E. Blake, Sr. – Board Member (1990–2021), Presiding Bishop (2007–2021), Presiding Bishop Emeritus (2021–present) California
- Bishop David A. Hall – Board Member (2021–2024), Tennessee
- Bishop Malcolm Coby – Board Member (2021–2024), Oklahoma

In addition to the general board, there is a board of bishops that is composed of all jurisdictional and auxiliary bishops, a national trustee board that is composed of 15 members who are elected for a term of four years, the General Council of Pastors and Elders, which is open to any officially recognized pastor and current credentialed ordained elder in the church.

==== Additional officers ====
- Chairman of the Board of Bishops – Bishop Donald Murray, California
- 1st Vice Chairman of the Board of Bishops – Bishop Roger L. Jones, Michigan
- 2nd Vice Chairman of the Board of Bishops – Bishop William Watson, III, Texas
- Secretary of the Board of Bishops – Bishop Adrian Williams, Georgia
- Vice Chairman of the General Assembly – Bishop Melvin Smith, Missouri
- Chairman of the General Council of Pastors and Elders – Bishop-Designate Michael Eaddy, Illinois
- Vice chairman of the General Council of Pastors and Elders – Superintendent Kiemba Knowlin, Michigan
- Secretary of the General Council of Pastors and Elders – Superintendent Andre Fluker, Illinois
- Treasurer of the General Council of Pastors and Elders – Pastor William Ward, Virginia
- Chief operating officer (COO) – Bishop Keith Kershaw, South Carolina
- Adjutant General – Bishop Dickerson L. S. Wells Sr., Tennessee
- Chief of Security (for COGIC conventions and conferences) – Bishop William E. McMillan, Jr., Maryland
- General Board Clerk – Bishop Talbert W. Swan II, Massachusetts
- General Supervisor, International Department of Women – Mother Barbara McCoo Lewis, California
- Chairman of the National Judiciary Board – Bishop Martin Luther Johnson, New Jersey
- Vice Chairman of the National Judiciary Board – Bishop Enoch Perry, Washington, D.C.
- Secretary of the National Judiciary Board – Elder Carl King, Illinois
- Chairman of the National Board of Trustees – Superintendent Melton Timmons, Michigan
- First Vice Chairman of the National Board of Trustees – Attorney Amos Smith, Illinois
- Second Vice Chairman of the National Board of Trustees – Mother Georgia Macklin Lowe, Tennessee
- Secretary of the National Board of Trustees – Missionary Jennifer Patterson Hill, Tennessee
- Assistant General Secretary – Bishop Talbert W. Swan II, Massachusetts
- Assistant General Treasurer – Bishop Kendall Anderson, Tennessee
- Assistant Financial Secretary – Bishop Tyrone Butler, New York
- Chairman of AIM – Superintendent Nathaniel Green, Texas
- Vice-Chairs of AIM - Elder Ryan Allen, Washington, DC, Deacon Christopher Payton, Illinois, Evangelist Althea Sims, California, Pastor Billy J. Evans, Illinois
- Co-President of the Men's Ministry – Bishop Roderick Hennings, New York
- Co-President of the Men's Ministry – Bishop Patrick L. Wooden Sr., North Carolina
- President, International Sunday School Department – Superintendent Mark Ellis, Louisiana
- Field representative, International Sunday School Department – First Lady Bonita Shelby, Michigan
- President, International Youth Department – Pastor Kale Mann, New York
- Chairlady, International Youth Department – Evangelist Vandalyn Kennedy, New York
- President, International Department of Missions – Bishop Terence P. Rhone, California
- Elect Lady, International Department of Missions – Supervisor Lee E. Van Zandt, Maryland
- Vice Presidents, International Department of Missions – Bishop Nate' M. Jefferson, South Carolina; Supervisor Maddaline Norfleet, Connecticut; Bishop Solomon Iyobosa Omo-Osagie, Maryland; Supervisor Faye M. Butler, New York; and Bishop Bevin Lawrence, India
- President, International Department of Evangelism – Pastor Gary Sprewell, California
- Elect Lady, International Department of Evangelism – Evangelist Dr. Dorinda Clark-Cole, Michigan
- President, International Music Department – Dr. Myron Williams, Texas
- Vice Presidents of the International Music Department – Evangelist Kierra Sheard-Kelly, Michigan; Evangelist Rosalind Jones; Pastor Derrick Starks; Superintendent C. Ivan Johnson; Evangelist Chrystal Rucker; and Elder Zacchaeus Hayslett
- Director, Social Justice Ministry - Bishop Talbert W. Swan II, Massachusetts.

=== Ecclesiastical structure ===
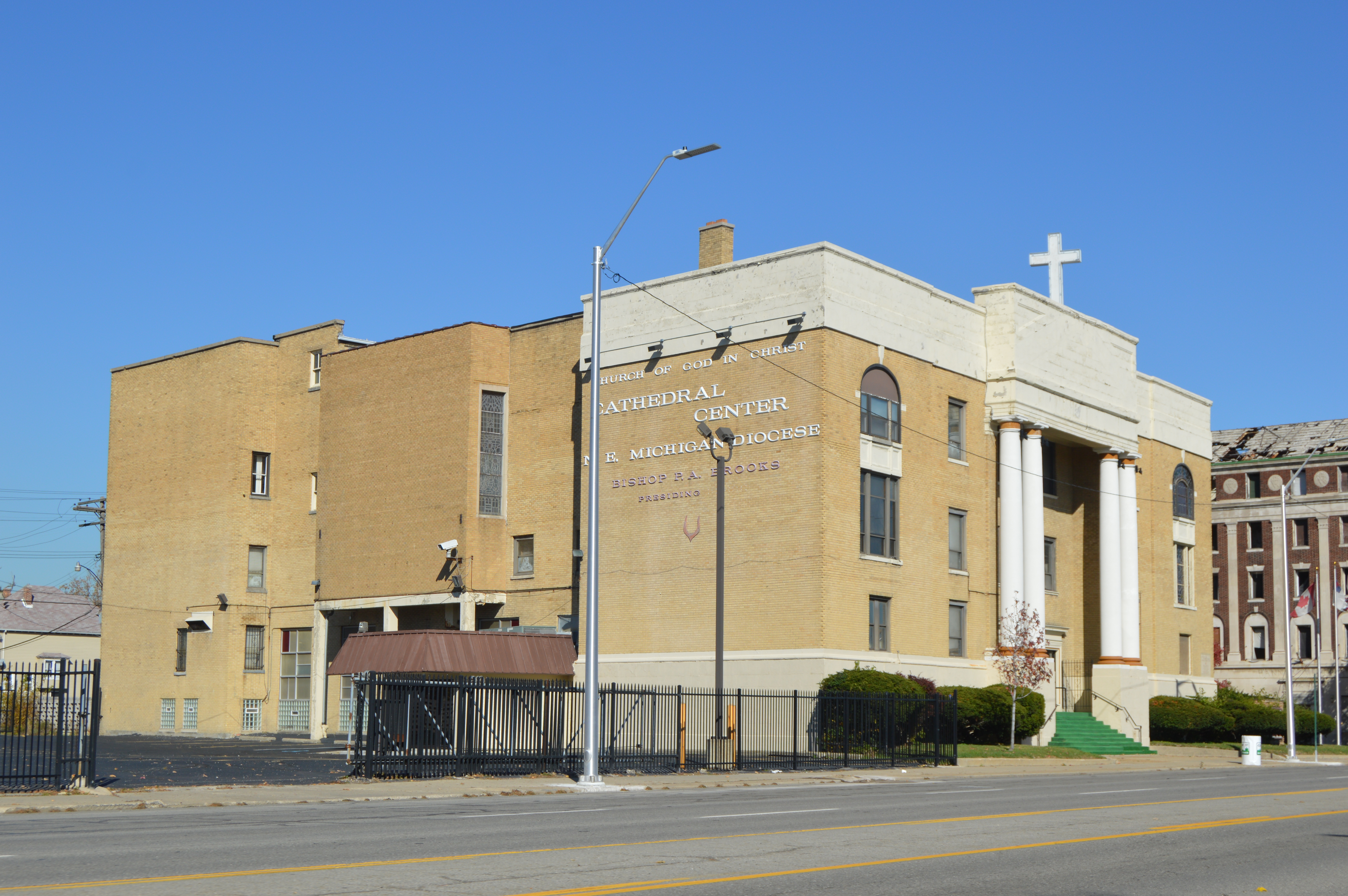
COGIC Cathedral complex in Detroit

The Church of God in Christ ecclesiastical structure is an episcopal-presbyterian form of government. Churches are organized in dioceses called jurisdictions, each under the authority of a bishop. There is a presiding bishop, known as the chief apostle of the church. The presiding bishop is part of a general board, consisting of eleven other bishops elected by a general assembly consisting of pastors, elders, chaplains, bishops, missionaries, supervisors, and designated lay delegates. The general assembly is the supreme authority over the church to decide matters of faith and practice. Jurisdictions range in size between 30 and 100 churches. Each state in the US consists of at least one jurisdiction, and several states have more than one jurisdiction. These jurisdictions are then separated into districts, which consist of 5 to 7 churches and are governed by superintendents (ordained elder or pastor). There are more than 200 ecclesiastical jurisdictions around the world, with 170 in the United States. Jurisdictions are set up similar to the national church in terms of composition, polity, and procedure.

=== Annual events ===
- Leadership Conference (January)
- General Assembly and Call Meeting (April), Memphis
- Men Perfecting Men Conference (May)
- International Women's Convention (May)
- International Auxiliaries in Ministry (AIM) Convention (July)
- Shepherds Conference and Elders Academy (August)
- Bishop C.H. Mason Birthday / Founder's Celebration (September)
- Bishop's Conference (September)
- International Holy Convocation and General Assembly (November)

Mason Temple (Memphis, Tennessee) serves as the denomination's international headquarters.

== Department ministries ==
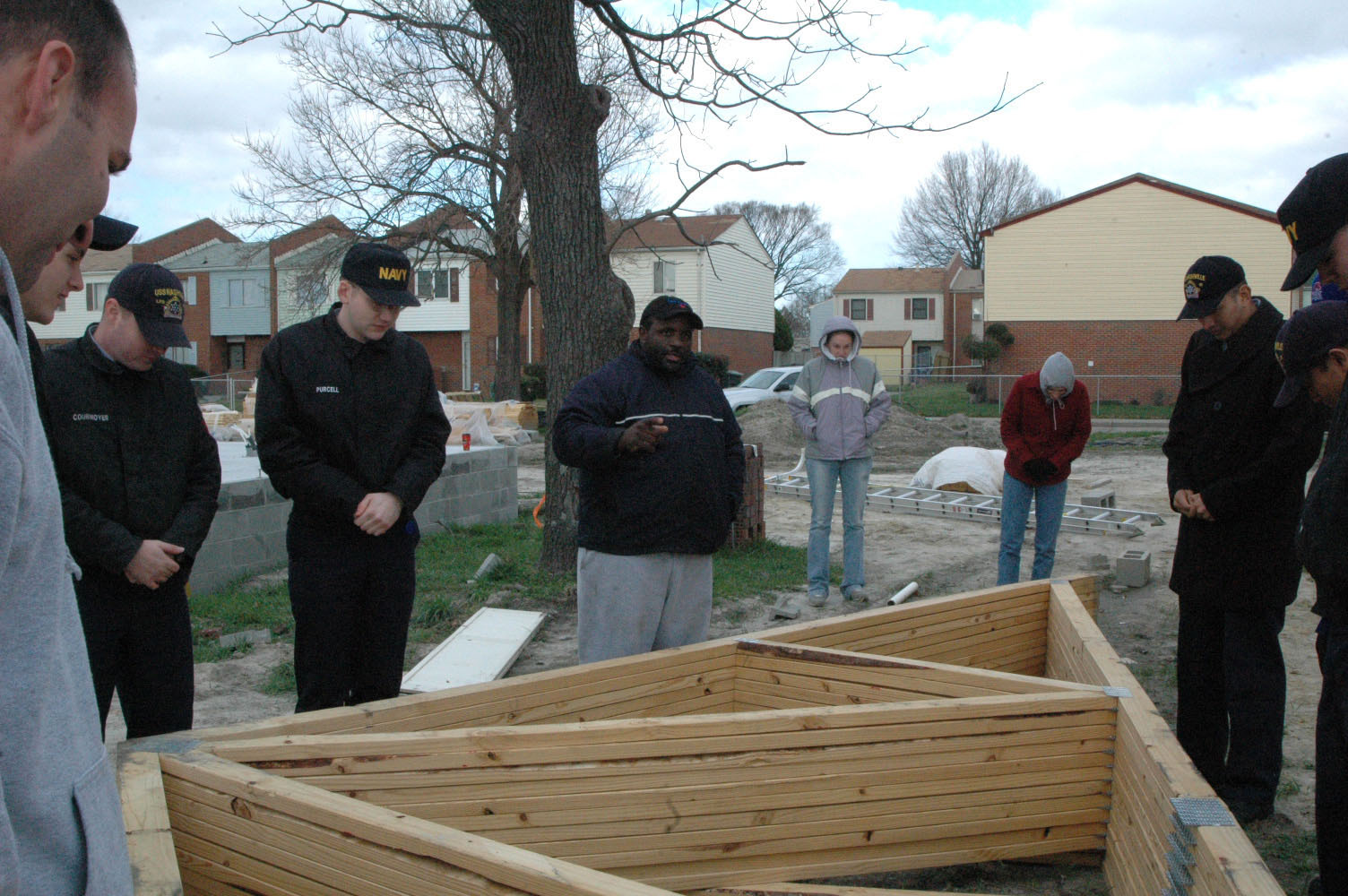
Antonio Burke, pastor for the Center of Love Church of God in Christ (COGIC), leads Sailors from amphibious transport dock USS Nashville (LPD-13) in a prayer before building a house for Habitat for Humanity in Norfolk, Va.

During the formative stages of COGIC, Bishop Mason organized departments to further support the work of the church as it continued to grow and expand. These departments include: the Women's Department, the Sunday School Department, the Youth Department known as Y.P.W.W. (Young People Willing Workers), and Missions and Evangelism. As COGIC has continued to grow, new departments, auxiliaries, and ministries have been established including the music department, the National Adjutancy, Men's Department, COGIC Charities, and Urban Initiatives to name a few. These auxiliaries are found in nearly every church, district, and jurisdiction within COGIC and function to support the holistic approach that COGIC has toward ministry within the church and the larger community that COGIC congregations serve.

=== Women's Department ===
Women in COGIC have been influential in the leadership and organization of the church since its inception. They are the largest department in the COGIC. Bishop Mason was opposed to the ordination of women to formal ministry, but in 1911 created an autonomous department to promote the ministry of women in the church. The church believes that women are gifted and called to ministry; it does not, however, officially ordain women to the office of elder, pastor, or bishop. Nevertheless, women are licensed in COGIC to proclaim the gospel as evangelists. COGIC licensed female evangelists may also serve as chaplains in military, federal, state, and local institutions requiring chaplains. This endorsement allows female chaplains who are serving in the military, working in an institution or jails to perform religious services including funerals and weddings. Some pastor's wives have served as pastor of congregations usually after the death of a pastor sometimes serving under the title of "shepherdess, shepherd mother, or church administrator".

==== Organization of the department ====
A general supervisor of women is appointed by the presiding bishop and given authority to lead the International Women's Ministry of the church. Each jurisdictional bishop appoints a jurisdictional supervisor to lead the work of the women on a jurisdictional level. The jurisdictional supervisor is assisted by district missionaries who oversee the women's ministry of the district. Historically, women in ministry in COGIC are known as "Missionaries" and are designated in two categories: Deaconess Missionary, and Evangelist Missionary. Deaconess Missionaries serve and assist in the ceremonial and temporal affairs of the local church. Evangelist Missionaries are licensed to preach the gospel, conduct gospel meetings, and may be given the oversight of local congregations serving as the church administrator. Recognizing the significance of women to the ministry, COGIC has created numerous positions that allow women to work as counterparts to the department presidents as chair ladies (YPWW) and Elect ladies (Evangelism).

On the local church level in addition to the office of missionary, COGIC developed and has maintained the position of the "church mother". Church mothers have historically served as the leader of the women's ministries in the local congregations. The designated church mother along with other "older and seasoned" women of the church provided the practical teaching of holiness in daily life and practice. Today however, many church mothers have been reserved to titular positions as many pastor's wives have assumed the role of leader of women's ministries in local congregations. Despite what seems to be obvious limitations to minister because of ordination, women have been given great latitude and numerous opportunities to serve in ministry in COGIC. As a result, many local congregations, foreign missions, and schools were established through the leadership and efforts of women in COGIC.

==== General supervisors for the Department of Women ====
- Mother Lizzie Woods Robinson – first general supervisor (1911–1945)
- Mother Lillian Brooks Coffey – second general supervisor and founding president of the Women's International Convention (1946–1964)
- Mother Annie L. Bailey – third general supervisor (1964–1975)
- Mother Mattie McGlothen – fourth general supervisor (1975–1994)
- Mother Emma F. Crouch – fifth general supervisor (1994–1997)
- Mother Willie Mae Rivers – sixth general supervisor (1997–2017)
- Mother Barbara McCoo Lewis – seventh general supervisor (2017–present)

Lizzie Woods Robinson (1911–1945) was the first "General Mother" of the church. Finding two groups of women in the church, one group praying known as the Prayer Band, the other group studying and teaching the Word known as the Bible Band, she combined the two under the name of the Prayer and Bible Band. She organized the sewing circle and after meeting Elder Searcy, she encouraged the women to support mission work through the Home and Foreign Mission bands. As the church continued to grow, she created women auxiliaries including the Purity Class and the Sunshine Band. She began women's work on the state level and appointed the first state mothers. Robinson was a staunch advocate for holiness and taught strict guidelines for the women with regard to dress and worldliness. She was greatly interested in the building of Mason Temple and she kept her national building fund drives functioning until she knew the building was ready for dedication. When she died in 1945, she had laid an impressive foundation for the women's ministry in COGIC.

Her successor, Lillian Brooks Coffey (1945–1964) was the organizer of the Women's International Convention to support the work of foreign missionaries. The first convention was held in Los Angeles, California, in 1951. Today the International Women's Convention/Crusade meets annually in May in different cities throughout the nation drawing thousands of women from around the world. It is one of the largest gathering of Christian women from any major denomination and religious organization. Coffey was a child convert to COGIC under the preaching of Bishop Mason, and was influential in organizing many of the auxiliaries, bands, and units that exist within the COGIC Women's Department. The most active women's auxiliaries include: Missionary Circle, Hospitality, Executive Hospitality, Hulda Club, Wide Awake Band, Minister's Wives Circle, Deaconess, Deacon's Wives Circle, Prayer Warriors, Young Women's Christian Council, Usher Board, Educational Committee, Boy's League, Big Brothers, Cradle Roll, Women's Chorus, Board of Examiners, Public Relations, News Reporters and the Burners Home and Foreign Mission Bands. Coffey also began the use of the title "Jurisdictional Supervisor" for state mothers as more jurisdictions were forming in each state.

After the death of Mother Coffey in 1964, Dr. Annie L. Bailey (1964–1975), became the third General Supervisor. She was the wife and companion of Bishop John Seth Bailey, a trusted adviser of Bishop Mason, and later the first assistant presiding bishop of the church. The pair modeled the pastor and wife ministry team in COGIC. She developed the International Women's Convention into a training institute for women in the ministry. She served as the jurisdictional supervisor of several states including Maryland and New Jersey helping to establish and stabilize struggling jurisdictions. Units added during her tenure as general supervisor were the: business and Professional Women's Federation, Rescue Squad, Sunday School Representatives Unit, United Sisters of Charity, National Secretaries Unit, and the Jr. Missionaries.

Dr. Mattie McGlothen (1975–1994) the fourth General Supervisor, was an organizer with significant impact on the development of the Women's Department. She was the Jurisdictional Supervisor of Women for California Northern First Jurisdiction. She established new auxiliaries including the International Hospitality Unit, the Educational and Bishop's Wives Scholarship funds, WE-12 and Lavender Ladies. She built a home for missionaries in the Bahamas, a pavilion for senior citizens and unwed mothers in Port-au-Prince, Haiti. She also established the Mattie McGlothen Library and Museum in Richmond, California, as a resource for COGIC historical facts and memorabilia. Finally under her administration, the visible presence of women in ministry changed with the introduction of the ministry "habit". Today thousands of COGIC women when ministering the gospel or serving in official capacities are seen in their civic (black) or ceremonial (white) habits.

After the death of Mother McGlothen, Mother Emma F. Crouch (1994–1997) of Dallas, Texas, served as the fifth General Supervisor. She was the Jurisdictional Supervisor of Women for Texas Southwest Jurisdiction under the late Bishop T. D. Iglehart. In her brief tenure, she encouraged the women to stay focused and supportive to the leadership of the church. One of her contributions was to divide the women's fellowship in the local congregations into two groups: The Christian Women's Council for the middle aged and senior women, and the Young Women's Christian Council (YWCC) for the younger women.

Mother Willie Mae Rivers (1997–2017) of Goose Creek, South Carolina, succeeded Mother Crouch. She is also the Jurisdictional Supervisor of Women for the South Carolina Jurisdiction. She served as chairperson of the board of supervisors, member, Executive Board, member, Screening Committee, member, Program Committee General Church, coordinator, Leadership Conference, International Marshall, secretary, and Assistant General Supervisor for the Department of Women. A local church mother since the age of 21, she was committed to strengthening the auxiliaries in the local churches and to prepare the younger women to carry the mission of COGIC into the Twenty-first Century. Under her leadership, the Women's International Convention added the term "and Crusade" to highlight and promote the evangelistic approach of the convention. Mother Rivers also began the "49 and Under" to enlist and focus the younger women of COGIC to remain committed to the doctrine and teachings of the church. Mother Willie Mae Rivers served faithfully for 20 years as General Mother until 2017 and the age of 91.

The current General Supervisor of Women is Dr. Barbara McCoo Lewis of Los Angeles, California. She is also the Jurisdictional Supervisor for the First Jurisdiction, Southern California. She has previously served on the Women's advisory board, Executive Board, steering committee Women's International Convention, General Supervisor's Regional Representative (West Coast Region of the United States), member of the Program Committee then chairperson, Chairperson Special Convention Assistance Committee, National Leadership Conference and Women's Convention Leadership Conference, International Marshall and Assistant General Supervisor. A visionary, she spearheaded the establishment of the multi-million dollar Hale Morris Lewis Manor, a senior citizen complex in Los Angeles, CA.

==== Significant women of COGIC ministry ====
As has been stated, COGIC does not ordain women as elder or bishop, however, COGIC would not have become the largest predominately African American Pentecostal church in the world, nor have the largest Women's convention of any major denomination without the contributions of women. These women have been listed for their significant contributions and impact to the church.

- Evangelist Emily Bram Bibby#, longest-serving national female evangelist
- Missionary Pearl Paige Brown#, foreign missionary
- Dr. Valerie Daniels Carter, entrepreneur, Jurisdictional Supervisor,
- Dr. Dorinda Clark Cole, International Elect Lady of Evangelism Dept., international evangelist
- Dr. Mattie Moss Clark #, second and longest-serving president of Int'l. Music Dept.
- Mother Elizabeth Dabney#, prayer leader
- Mother Dorothy Exume#, foreign missionary
- Evangelist Reatha D. Herndon#, first and longest-serving elect Lady, church organizer, national evangelist
- Supervisor Deola Wells Johnson, national evangelist, jurisdictional supervisor
- Mother Frances Kelley, prayer leader
- Evangelist Maria Gardner Langston, COGIC pastor, national evangelist, former Elect Lady
- Dr. Arenia Mallory#, educator, president, Saint's College
- Mother Elsie Washington Mason#, third and final wife of Bishop Mason
- Mother Lelia Washington Mason#, second wife of Bishop Mason
- State Senator Yvonne Miller#, evangelist missionary, state senator, VA
- Mother Deborah Mason Patterson#, daughter of founder, Bishop Mason and wife of first presiding bishop James O. Patterson Sr.
- Supervisor Irene Oakley#, pastor, supervisor, bishop's wife
- Mother Lee Etta Van Zandt, international missionary, supervisor of women, world missions elect lady
- Mother Louise Patterson#, evangelist, former first lady and wife of G.E. Patterson
- Mother Frances Kelley, prayer leader
- Evangelist Joyce L Rodgers#, Jurisdictional Supervisor, Former Chairlady of Youth Dept., international evangelist
- Mother Elsie Shaw#, prayer leader
- Dr. Lytia R. Howard, Emeritus, President of the Sunshine Band, COGIC Pastor
- Mother Leatha Herndon Chapman Tucker#, church organizer, national evangelist
- Mother Elizabeth White#, foreign missionary
- Dr. Rita Womack, national evangelist, former Elect Lady
- Mother Willa Mary Collins#, founding First Lady of Holy Trinity Church of God in Christ in Evansville, Indiana

(#) deceased

=== Sunday School Department ===
The first Sunday School Superintendent was Professor L. W. Lee (1908–1916). In 1924, the Sunday School was formally organized under "Father" F. C. Christmas (1916–1944). Elder L. C. Patrick was added to the National Sunday School. In 1945, Bishop S. Crouch of the Northern California Jurisdiction appointed Elder H. C. Johnson as State Sunday School Superintendent who appointed Missionary Lucille Cornelius to be Chairlady, the first woman to lead the supervision of COGIC women in the Sunday School Department. Mother Jennie Bell Dancy Jones of Arkansas became the first National Field Representative under Bishop Patrick. There was the creation of the Sunday School Field Representative. This office is reserved for a woman who serves as counterpart to the Sunday School Superintendent. These offices are found in every local, district, and jurisdiction to support development and growth of the Sunday School. In 1946, the National Sunday School Congress began to meet with the Young People's Willing Workers (YPWW) Congress. In 1951, the first separate National Sunday School Convention convened in Kansas City, Missouri. The current International Sunday School Superintendent is Superintendent Mark Ellis of Baton Rouge, Louisiana, and the International Field Representative is First Lady Bonita Shelby, of Canton, Michigan.

=== Young People Willing Workers (YPWW) International Youth Department (IYD) ===
The first youth leader on a national level was Elder M.C. Green. In 1917, the YPWW was officially organized under the leadership of Elder Ozro Thurston Jones Sr., who in 1928 established the first Youth Congress bringing together youth leaders and workers on a national level. He began production of the YPWW Quarterly Topics to train the youth of the COGIC in the faith, doctrine, and polity of the church. YPWW became a distinctive trademark for COGIC and the principle training institute usually meeting on Sunday night prior to evening worship services. For a brief period of time, the YPWW Congress was combined with the Sunday School Congress in a joint convention until 1951. The Youth Congress eventually become one of the largest conventions in COGIC. Other leaders of the Youth Department who leader became influential leaders of the church included: Bishop F.D. Washington, Bishop Chandler D. Owens, Bishop Brandon B. Porter, and Bishop J. Drew Sheard. To be consistent with progressive measures and modernization, in the Nineties, the international church along with many local COGIC churches began to use the term "youth department" instead of "YPWW. " Today, the International Youth Department (IYD) is led by the International Youth President, Pastor Kale Mann of New York, New York, and the International Chairlady, Evangelist Vandalyn Kennedy of Queens, New York.

=== Missions Department ===
Missions work in COGIC began under Elder Searcy in 1925. In 1926, upon the recommendation of Mother Lizzie Roberson, Elder C. G. Brown of Kansas City Missouri, was appointed the first Executive Secretary-Treasurer of the Home and Foreign Missions Department by Bishop C. H. Mason. The Elders' Council met and organized the first Missions board of the Church of God in Christ. In 1927, the call was made for workers to go to serve the Lord in foreign lands. Mrs. Mattie McCaulley of Tulsa, Oklahoma was the first to respond, and was sent to Trinidad. Thereafter, missionaries were sent to Africa and the islands of the Caribbean, Asia, and elsewhere. Military chaplains have also been instrumental in spreading COGIC through military installations. In November 1975, at the National Holy Convocation in Memphis, Tennessee, with the consent of the General Board, Bishop Carlis Moody Sr. of Evanston, Illinois, was appointed by Bishop J. O. Patterson to be president of the Department of Home and Foreign Missions. Bishop Carlis Moody immediately began to reorganize the Missions Department, giving new guidelines. President Moody also added these ministries to the Missions Department:

1. Youth on a Mission (YOAM) – a ministry of young people visiting the mission field to serve each summer.
2. Student Aid – a ministry of support to foreign students.
3. Touch a Life – child support ministry
4. Nurses Aid Ministry – nurses taking their skills to the mission field.
5. Sister Church Support Ministry – a church in the USA giving support to a church on the mission field.
6. The Voice of Missions – a bimonthly magazine

Today COGIC has more than 12,000 churches, and several schools, missions, and medical clinics in more than eighty nations, including every inhabited continent. The church is thought to have nearly two million members in 7,000 churches on the continent of Africa. The church has more than 3,000 churches in Asia, and 2,000 churches in the Caribbean and South America. The fastest growing areas include Nigeria, South Africa, Brazil, and India. Nigeria alone has 19 bishops and more than 2000 churches. The international membership of COGIC is estimated be between one and three million adherents. In 2015, after more than 40 years of faithful service, Bishop Carlis L. Moody was emeritized as Bishop of Missions. The current president of the Missions Department is Bishop Dr. Terence P. Rhone of Pomona, California and Prelate for Brazil First Jurisdiction. The current Elect Lady is Supervisor Lee E. Van Zandt of Vienna, Maryland.

=== Evangelism Department ===
The Department of Evangelism was officially organized on a national level by Overseer L.C. Page in 1927. The spread of COGIC was due largely to the efforts of its evangelists through crusades and revivals. Male as well as female evangelists were instrumental in spreading COGIC throughout the United States as well as around the world. The first meeting was held in Memphis, Tennessee around 1937. The early conventions of the Evangelist Board were basically crusades led by Page and a few other Evangelists from across the country. In 1981, Bishop J.O. Patterson appointed Dr. Edward Lee Battles President of the Department of Evangelism. During his administration, Battles organized Regions to oversee evangelistic ministry in various regional areas across the country. He also instituted the Annual Prayer Breakfast, conducted Evangelistic Crusades across the country and developed the Church of God in Christ National Evangelist Registry. Battles served as president until his death in December 1996.

In 1997, Bishop Chandler D. Owens appointed Evangelist Richard "Mr. Clean" White as president of the Department of Evangelism. He continued to build on the department through expansion of the Regional Administration into 10 geographical locations across the country. He appointed regional presidents to serve as liaisons to the jurisdictional presidents. Of special note is Evangelist Reatha Herndon who served as the International Elect Lady of the Department of Evangelism from 1951 to 2001. Mother Lillian Coffey appointed Mother Reatha Herndon as president of the National Women's Evangelist Board in 1951. Herndon and her twin sister Leatha were pioneers of the evangelistic work of the Church of God in Christ. Together they traveled across the country proclaiming the Gospel of Jesus Christ. They were also instrumental in establishing 75 churches across the nation. Pastor Dennis Martin and Superintendent Willie James Campbell succeeded Bishop White as presidents. The current president of the Department of Evangelism is Pastor Gary Sprewell of Los Angeles, California. In 2017, Presiding Bishop Charles E. Blake appointed gospel artist and Evangelist Dr. Dorinda Clark-Cole of Detroit, Michigan as the Elect Lady. Her predecessor was Evangelist Dr. Rita Womack of Los Angeles, California.

=== Music Department ===
Pentecostals have been known and continue to be known for their lively worship, exuberant expressions of praise and worship, and musical compilations, mostly relying on congregational singing of hymns and chants. The COGIC emphasized the use of the choir as an integral part of the worship experience. From the very beginning of gospel music, COGIC members have influenced its rise. In the 1920s, Arizona Dranes, a blind Evangelist Missionary became one of the first gospel artists to bring the musical styles of COGIC to the public in her records for Okeh and performances. Later, Sister Rosetta Tharpe, iconically known as the "godmother of Rock and Roll", expanded and highlighted the COGIC sound to the greater American public in the 1930s and 1940s. Evangelist Goldia Haynes, Elder Utah Smith, Madame Earnestine Washington, and Marion Williams continued COGIC's influence throughout the fifties and sixties. Mrs. Anna Broy Crockett Ford was the first organizer and director of the National Music Department, which was formally established in November 1949.

==== Dr. Mattie Moss Clark ====
COGIC became a staple of gospel music under the guidance and leadership of Dr. Mattie Moss Clark. (1972–1994). She revolutionized and reorganized the music ministry to become a leading department in the church. She developed the role of the State Minister of Music and traveled the world conducting seminars and workshops perfecting the quality of choir music, their performance, appearance and demeanor, and the COGIC sound. Under her leadership and tenure, COGIC choirs and individual singers came to dominate gospel music producing a number of recordings and gospel hits. She formed her daughters into a singing group who became known as the legendary "Clark Sisters" who helped introduce and became leaders of the contemporary gospel music era. In 1982 during the Seventy-Fifth Holy Convocation, the diamond jubilee of the church, COGIC published its own hymnal, Yes, Lord!, which included many arrangements and songs written by COGIC and African American musicians and songwriters. She is the longest serving president of the International Music Department and her influence and legacy have been indelible and are recognized around the world.

==== Influence of COGIC on gospel music ====
Well-known gospel musicians with COGIC roots include; Andrae Crouch and Sandra Crouch, Walter Hawkins and Edwin Hawkins, Tramaine Hawkins, Rubenstein McClure, Yvette Flunder, Sara Jordan Powell, Daryl Coley, BeBe and CeCe Winans, The Winans, "Detroit" Gary Wiggins, John P. Kee, The O'Neal Twins, Vanessa Bell Armstrong, Rance Allen, Rev. Timothy Wright, Myrna Summers, Rev. James Moore, Thomas Whitfield (singer), Deniece Williams, Hubert Powell, Donnie McClurkin, LaShun Pace, The Anointed Pace Sisters, Dr. Bettye Ransom Nelson, Bishop Richard "Mr. Clean" White, Bishop Paul S. Morton, The Clark Sisters: (Jacky Clark-Chisholm, Elbernita "Twinkie" Clark, Dorinda Clark-Cole and Karen Clark-Sheard). COGIC continues to influence gospel music with a new generation of artists with COGIC roots that include: Kim Burrell, Ivan Powell, Doobie Powell, Kierra Sheard, J. Moss, Micah Stampley, Kurt Carr, Ricky Dillard, Kelly Price, Mary Mary Erica Campbell (musician) and Tina Campbell (musician), Tamela Mann, Dr. Gennie Ruth Cheatham Chandler, Earnest Pugh, Jonathan McReynolds, Jabari Johnson, DuShawn Washington, Instrumentalists: Dr. Vernard Johnson (saxophonist), Samuel Murrell (violinist) and Terrance Curry (trombonist), D'Extra Wiley (II D Extreme) and Michelle Williams (Destiny's Child). The current leader of the International Music Department is recording artist Dr. Myron Williams, succeeding Dr. Judith Christie McAllister of Los Angeles, California, who is also a praise and worship national recording artist. Former International Music Department President Professor Iris Stevenson-McCullough (originally from Rochester, New York) is a major influence in the gospel music industry around the world.

=== United National Auxiliary Conference (UNAC) and Auxiliaries in Ministry (AIM) ===
As COGIC continued to grow, the various departments began the practice of convening annually to conduct the business unique of their ministries. The YPWW department began in 1928 with the convening of its first Youth Congress. Then in 1946, the YPWW Department was combined with the Sunday School Department for joint conventions until 1951 when they were separated once again. Each department convened its own convention in various cities through 1975. In 1976, under the leadership of Bishop J.O. Patterson Sr., the five major departments of COGIC were united under an umbrella convention known as UNAC-5 (United National Auxiliary Convention). Dr. Roy L.H. Winbush was selected to serve as the first chairman. In 1992, during the Ford administration, UNAC was disbanded in favor of three separate conventions namely: the International Sunday School Convention, the MY Convention (Music and Youth) and the ME Convention (Missions and Evangelism) again meeting in separate cities.. However, in 1996, the umbrella format was revised under the administration of Bishop C.D. Owens and became known as AIM (Auxiliaries in Ministry). Bishop J.W. Macklin was selected as the first chairman. This convention brings thousands of COGIC members representing all the major departments including Sunday School, Missions, Evangelism, Music, and Youth together in July and meets in cities around the U.S. The current chairman of AIM is Superintendent Nathaniel Green of Dallas, Texas.

== Educational institutions ==
In 1918, COGIC opened its first institution of higher learning, the Saints Industrial and Literary School in Lexington, Mississippi, for both girls and boys. In keeping with the times, the school had some industrial education and training for its students, so that they could learn practical skills. It also increasingly stressed high academic standards so that its graduates could go to normal school or college, especially to teach other African Americans. Education was considered key to advancement of the race. As public education was segregated and underfunded by white officials in the South through most of the tenure of the first major leader, this school became a destination for parents wanting their children to have high-quality education. Two other institutions associated with COGIC were also established, Page Normal and Industrial School in Hearne, Texas, and the Geridge School in Geridge, Arkansas.

Saints Industrial School enjoyed its greatest growth and success under the leadership of Dr. Arenia Conella Mallory (1904–1977). Bishop Mason appointed her as a young woman to be head of the small school in 1926, after she had been teaching there. She led its expansion and emphasized high academic standards, disciplined behavior, and prayer. She also established a musical program. She established a high school and gained accreditation for it, and then for the junior college which she founded on campus. By that time, it was known as Saints Academy and Junior College. During her leadership, several new buildings were constructed on the 350-acre campus to serve this expansion. African American parents sent their children to this school from across the United States, especially those who had grown up in Mississippi and knew its reputation. Mallory retired in 1976 after fifty years of service; and she had a national reputation. Known for the achievements of her students and school alumni, she had also served during these years, by invitation and appointment, on national federal commissions and with noted African American women's groups.

The school closed in 1977 after her death, as it struggled financially in a period when some families were choosing integrated schools for their children. It was reopened in the early 1990s under the administration of Bishop L.H. Ford, as Saints' Academy, a private co-educational grade school. The school and college remain closed at present.

In 1968, COGIC established the C.H. Mason Theological Seminary to train its ministers and ministry leaders. Today COGIC operates the All Saints Bible College in Memphis, the C. H. Mason system of bible colleges, and the C. H. Mason Theological Seminary in Atlanta, Georgia. The seminary is accredited by the Association of Theological Schools (ATS) and is part of a consortium of the Interdenominational Theological Center.

== Notable ministers ==
- Samuel L. Green Jr., television minister, general board member jurisdictional bishop, Virginia Second Jurisdiction; pastor, St. John's, Newport News, Virginia
- Bobby Rush, U.S. Congressman; pastor, Beloved Christian Community, Chicago
- Talbert W. Swan II, Assistant General Secretary, Massachusetts; Prelate, Nova Scotia Ecclesiastical Jurisdiction, Pastor, Spring of Hope, Springfield, Massachusetts, activist, author, Radio Talk Show Host, National Chaplain, Iota Phi Theta, President, Greater Springfield NAACP
- Ted G. Thomas, general board member, jurisdictional bishop, Virginia First Jurisdiction; Pastor, New Community Temple, Portsmouth, Virginia
- Barnett K. Thoroughgood, adjutant general, auxiliary bishop; pastor, New Jerusalem, Virginia Beach, Virginia
- F. D. Washington, general board member, jurisdictional bishop, Eastern New York First Jurisdiction; pastor, Washington Temple, Brooklyn, New York
- Denzel Washington, actor

== Controversy ==
At the 107th COGIC Holy Convocation held in St. Louis in 2014, Superintendent Earl Carter—a licensed and ordained Elder and Pastor within the denomination—was selected by the leadership as the keynote speaker for the Saturday night service. During his sermon, Carter addressed sexual misconduct and immorality within the church, focusing particularly on homosexuality, which COGIC doctrine considers to be sinful and incompatible with its teachings.

In his sermon, Carter used inflammatory language, referring to gay men as "sissies", "perverted", and "lost abominations". At one point, he said, "If you want to feel like a girl, I wish God would give you the monthly of a girl—I wish He had you bleeding out of your butt." A brief excerpt of his sermon circulated rapidly on social media and television, sparking widespread backlash.

In response to the controversy, the COGIC Presiding Bishop at the time, Bishop Charles E. Blake issued a public apology, stating, "I apologize for what seemed to be a harsh, uncompassionate, disrespectful spirit on the part of that speaker." Bishop Blake also extended a personal apology to Andrew Caldwell, a young man who had come forward immediately after Carter's sermon to testify that he had been "delivered from homosexuality". Caldwell's testimony went viral, subjecting him to intense public ridicule and scrutiny. He later claimed he felt pressured to testify due to the tone and content of Carter's message.

Superintendent Carter initially refused to apologize to the COGIC body, which led to a very public conflict between him and Bishop Blake. The tension escalated when Carter accused Bishop Blake of sexual misconduct—allegations that were ultimately deemed baseless in court. Bishop Blake filed a defamation lawsuit against Carter, which he won. The court ordered Carter to remove all defamatory videos related to Bishop Blake, and Carter complied. However, he clarified that while he was retracting statements specific to Bishop Blake, he was not recanting his broader views on homosexuality or sexual immorality.

== See also ==
- Charles Harrison Mason
- Charles Edward Blake Sr.
- Gilbert E. Patterson
- O.T. Jones Sr.
- Arenia Mallory
- Denver Heights COGIC
- Gilbert E. Patterson
- Talbert W. Swan II
- Lizzie Robinson House in North Omaha, Nebraska
- List of jurisdictions of the Church of God in Christ
- Protestantism in the United States
- Christianity in the United States
- List of the largest Protestant bodies
