= Jennifer Jones Austin =

American executive

Jennifer Jones Austin (née Jennifer Barkley Jones; born 1967 or 1968) is an American civil rights and social policy advocate and lawyer, author and talk show host, nonprofit CEO and executive, and former government official.

== Early life ==
Jones Austin was born and raised in Brooklyn, N.Y. to Baptist preacher William Augustus Jones Jr. and Natalie Barkley Jones (née. Brown), the corporate arts-curator for American Telephone & Telegraph. She was raised in a family active in the American civil rights movement, her father being a confidant of Martin Luther King Jr., serving as President of the New York Chapter of the Southern Christian Leadership Conference, and President of its economic justice arm, Operation Breadbasket, locally and nationally. Her father was also a founding member and President of the Progressive National Baptist Convention, which was formed in 1961 when conservative Baptists considered vocal advocacy for civil rights as too radical and founding President of the National Black Pastors Conference.

Jones Austin graduated from Rutgers University, and a Juris Doctor degree from Fordham University School of Law, graduating in 1993. She earned a Master's in Management and Policy at New York University's Robert F. Wagner Graduate School of Public Service, graduating in 1997.

== Career ==
Jones Austin is CEO of the Federation of Protestant Welfare Agencies (FPWA), an anti-poverty, policy and advocacy organization. Prior to joining FPWA, Jones Austin served as Senior Vice President of the United Way of New York City; the City of New York’s first Family Services Coordinator; Deputy Commissioner for the NYC Administration for Children’s Services; Civil Rights Deputy Bureau Chief for Attorney General Eliot Spitzer; and Vice President for LearnNow/Edison Schools, Inc.

Jones Austin chairs the NYC Racial Justice Commission. She has chaired the Mayoral Transition for Bill de Blasio, the NYC Procurement Policy Board, the NYC Board of Correction, where she presided over the promulgation of rules to end solitary confinement; the NYS Supermarket Commission; and the Community Engagement for Brooklyn District Attorney Gonzalez’s Justice 2020 Initiative. She was a lead advisor for the NYPD Reform and Reinvention Collaborative. She serves as Vice Chair of the Board of National Action Network; member of the Feerick Center for Social Justice Advisory Board; member of the Center for Law, Brain and Behavior Advisory Board at Harvard University; and member of the COVID-19 “Roll Up Your Sleeves” Task Force created to ensure vaccine information and equitable access in Black and Brown communities. She was the scholar in residence at Nyack College and Alliance Theological Seminary Center for Racial Reconciliation (CRR) from 2020 to 2022.

Jones Austin co-hosts WBLS’ “Open Line”, guest hosts weekly the nationally syndicated radio program, “Keep’n It Real with Rev. Al Sharpton”, and has appeared on the cable show, “Brooklyn Savvy”. She is a returning guest and contributor on the “Karen Hunter Show”.

Jones Austin is the author of Consider It Pure Joy, the account of her year-long battle with a sudden, life threatening illness. She is the editor of God in The Ghetto: A Prophetic Word Revisited, the re-release of her father, William Augustus Jones Jr.’s work deconstructing the “system” of racism, capitalism and militarism.

== Personal life ==
Jones Austin is married to Shawn V. Austin, an insurance executive. They have two children together, daughter Kennedy (born 1997) and son Channing (born 2001).

In 2009 Jones Austin was diagnosed with leukemia and given no chance of survival without a bone marrow transplant. Unable to find a match in the National Marrow Donor Registry, she and her husband marshaled their network, and were able to add 13,000 potential donors of color to the National Marrow Donor Program registry in 13 weeks. She never got a donor, but she discovered that a cord blood transplant using the stem cells from 2 African-American male babies’ umbilical cords was a viable alternative, and she was successfully transplanted in 2010.

Jones Austin and her family attend Bethany Baptist Church, in Bedford–Stuyvesant, Brooklyn, where her father was minister for 43 years.

Her memoir "Consider It Pure Joy", chronicling her search for a bone marrow donor, was published in 2018.

== Awards ==
In 2016, the Robert F. Wagner Graduate School of Public Service at New York University gave Jones Austin the Martin Luther King Jr. Humanitarian Award, for her ongoing work in social advocacy.
