= Charles Harrison Mason =

American bishop (1864–1961)

Bishop Charles Harrison Mason
- Successor: O. T. Jones Sr.

Personal details
- Born: September 8, 1864 Shelby County, Tennessee, US
- Died: November 17, 1961 (aged 97) Detroit, Michigan, US
- Spouse: Alice Saxton 1890–1892 (divorce); Lelia Washington 1905–1936 (her death); Elsie Washington 1943–1961 (his death)
- Occupation: Senior Bishop, Church of God in Christ, Chief Apostle, Pastor and Evangelist

Charles Harrison Mason Sr. (September 8, 1864 – November 17, 1961) was a Black American Holiness–Pentecostal pastor and minister. He was the founder and first Senior Bishop of the Church of God in Christ, based in Memphis, Tennessee. It developed into what is today the largest Holiness Pentecostal church denomination and one of the largest predominantly African-American Christian denominations in the United States.

== Childhood and early ministry ==
Mason was born the son of former slaves Jerry and Eliza Mason in Shelby County, Tennessee. He lived with his family in an unincorporated area near Bartlett. Mason worked with his family sharecropping and he did not receive an early formal education. As a child, Mason was greatly influenced by the religion of his parents. In 1879 at the age of fifteen Mason joined the Missionary Baptist Church in Shelby County; he was later baptized as a Christian by his older half-brother, Rev. I. S. Nelson. Mason had initially opposed pursuing ministry as a clergyman during his childhood and told his family he only wanted to remain a church lay member. When Mason was 14 years old, he contracted tuberculosis, when a tuberculosis and yellow fever epidemic spread through Shelby County in 1880. Because there were no medical centers or hospitals that would treat African Americans in Shelby County, and the small, poor medical centers that were owned and operated by African Americans proved to be of little help to the residents of Shelby County, Mason's father, Jerry died from the infectious disease, and the family was forced to relocate to Preston, Arkansas. Upon moving to Arkansas, as his own health briefly worsened, when Mason's mother and siblings prayed for him and asked the parishioners at a local Baptist church to pray for him, Mason was reportedly miraculously healed and quickly recovered. After fully recovering from the tuberculosis, it was then when he told his family and the local parishioners of the Baptist church his family had joined (which would later be known as the Mount Gale Missionary Baptist Church), "he believed God had healed him for the express purpose of alerting him to his spiritual duty"; He acknowledged throughout his teenage and young adult years subsequently that he believed "God called him into full-time ministry from then on."

In 1893, at the age of 27, Mason began his own ministerial career by accepting a local license from the Mount Gale Missionary Baptist Church in Preston, Arkansas. On November 1, 1893, Mason entered the Arkansas Baptist College, but withdrew after three months because of his dissatisfaction with their curriculum and methodology. He claimed his reason for leaving was because he believed "the teachings being promulgated at the particular Bible college were too liberal," and "...did not have a strong enough emphasis on the Word of God"; he was deeply disturbed by the particular hermeneutics and philosophical presuppositions that were underlying the curriculum set forth by the college and left in January 1894.

== Conversion to Holiness and Pentecostalism ==
At this period Mason became enamored with the autobiography of Amanda Berry Smith, an African Methodist Episcopal church evangelist. Smith had converted to the new wave of Holiness that was spreading during the latter part of the nineteenth century. Those who had accepted the Holiness message testified to being "entirely sanctified" and cleansed from sin. Mason claimed sanctification and began preaching the doctrine of Holiness and Sanctification in the local Baptist churches. In 1895, Mason also became acquainted with Charles Price Jones, a popular Baptist preacher from Mississippi who shared his enthusiasm for Holiness teachings, as well as J. E. Jeter from Little Rock, Arkansas, and W. S. Pleasant from Hazelhurst, Mississippi. These men spread the doctrine of Holiness and Sanctification throughout the African-American Baptist churches in Mississippi, Arkansas, and western Tennessee.

In June 1896, these men conducted a revival, preaching the message of Sanctification and Holiness that eventually led to their expulsion from the local Baptist association. In 1897, Mason and Jones formed a new fellowship of churches named simply "Church of God." Mason suggested the name "the Church of God in Christ," a name that he said came to him during a vision in Little Rock, Arkansas. The name could distinguish the new church from a number of "Church of God" groups that were forming at the time. In March 1907, Mason was sent by the church to Los Angeles to investigate the Azusa Street Revival being led by Reverend William J. Seymour. His stay lasted six weeks, and before it was over he experienced the baptism of the Holy Ghost and spoke in tongues.

=== Personal testimony of receiving the baptism with the Holy Ghost ===
The following are excerpts from Elder Mason's personal testimony regarding his receiving the Holy Ghost.

"The first day in the meeting I sat to myself, away from those that went with me. I began to thank God in my heart for all things, for when I heard some speak in tongues, I knew it was right though I did not understand it. Nevertheless, it was sweet to me.

I also thank God for Elder Seymour who came and preached a wonderful sermon. His words were sweet and powerful and it seems that I hear them now while writing. When he closed his sermon, he said 'All of those that want to be sanctified or baptized with the Holy Ghost, go to the upper room; and all those that want to be justified, come to the altar.'

I said that is the place for me, for it may be that I am not converted and if not, God knows it and can convert me..."

"Glory!"

"The second night of prayer I saw a vision. I saw myself standing alone and had a dry roll of paper in my mouth trying to swallow it. Looking up towards the heavens, there appeared a man at my side. I turned my eyes at once, then I awoke and the interpretation came.

God had me swallowing the whole book and if I did not turn my eyes to anyone but God and Him only, He would baptize me. I said yes to Him, and at once in the morning when I arose, I could hear a voice in me saying, "I see..."

"I got a place at the altar and began to thank God. After that, I said Lord if I could only baptize myself, I would do so; for I wanted the baptism so bad I did not know what to do. I said, Lord, You will have to do the work for me; so I turned it over into His hands."

"Then, I began to ask for the baptism of the Holy Ghost according to Acts 2:4("All were filled with the Holy Spirit. They began to express themselves in foreign tongues and make bold proclamation as the Spirit prompted them") and Acts 2:41 ("Then they that gladly received His word were baptized"). Then I saw that I had a right to be glad and not sad."

"The enemy said to me, there may be something wrong with you. Then a voice spoke to me saying, "If there is anything wrong with you, Christ will find it and take it away and marry you...Someone said, 'Let us sing.' I arose and the first song that came to me was 'He brought me out of the Miry Clay.' O Glory Hallelujah! Praise His most wonderful name!

The Spirit came upon the saints and upon me...Then I gave up for the Lord to have His way within me. So there came a wave of Glory into me and all of my being was filled with the Glory of the Lord.

So when He had gotten me straight on my feet, there came a light which enveloped my entire being above the brightness of the sun. When I opened my mouth to say Glory, a flame touched my tongue which ran down me. My language changed and no word could I speak in my own tongue. Oh! I was filled with the Glory of the Lord. My soul was then satisfied.

== Founder and Senior Bishop of the Church of God in Christ ==
Soon after his experience in Los Angeles, he returned to Mississippi preaching the new Pentecostal teachings on the Baptism of the Holy Ghost. He found that Elder Jones, the general overseer of the group, was opposed to it. After much debate at the general convocation in June 1907, Mason was expelled from the church. Later in November, he established a new pentecosal group in Memphis. He was elected the General Overseer of his group.

After years of conflict, in 1915 Mason won the legal rights to the name and charter of the Church of God in Christ (COGIC). In the years that followed, Mason directed his fledgling denomination. He commissioned traveling evangelists to spread COGIC's message, establishing working partnerships with various individuals, and particularly targeting the masses of African Americans headed for work in Northern cities in the Great Migration. He also founded two churches, Temple Church of God in Christ and St. Paul's Church of God in Christ.

After moving to Memphis and establishing it as the headquarters of COGIC, Mason founded and pastored the Temple COGIC. He established the annual "International Holy Convocation" to be held annually each year. As the church continued to grow, he established departments and auxiliaries including the Women's Department, Sunday School, and Young People Willing Workers (YPWW) which is known today as the International Youth Department (IYD). He also appointed overseers and established dioceses of the church throughout the country. Bishop Mason's preaching was very practical and his delivery was spontaneous, often moving from teaching to preaching to singing and praying all in one presentation. However, he is most known for his consistent, disciplined and deliberate prayer life. In fact, COGIC prides itself as a church built on prayer and fasting. Bishop Mason is credited with writing the prayer chant, "Yes Lord" that has become known worldwide and sung not only by COGIC, but countless churches and other denominations and reformations.

Mason traveled the length and breadth of the country and many foreign lands preaching and establishing COGIC churches. Bishop Mason was not exclusive in his ministry, he preached in COGIC and non-COGIC churches alike. He also preached to interracial audiences as well. In fact Bishop Mason licensed several white Pentecostal ministers and in 1914 he preached at the founding meeting of the Assemblies of God. In 1911, he established the first auxiliaries and departments of the church including: Women, Young People Willing Workers (YPWW), and Sunday School. In 1917, he was monitored by the government for speaking in opposition to America's entrance and support of World War I. His opposition, however, stemmed from the use of African-American men being called to fight for democracy abroad while having to face racism and discrimination here at home. In 1917, he also purchased 400 acres in Lexington, MS to establish the Saints Industrial and Literary School. The school began classes in 1918 and eventually became Saint's College. The college was the major institution of higher learning for COGIC youth until it closed in 1976.

In 1926, Mason further organized COGIC by authorizing the church's constitution outlining the bylaws, rules, and regulations of the church. In 1933, Bishop Mason set apart five overseers who became the first bishops in the church. In 1945, Mason dedicated the now historic Mason Temple in Memphis as the church's national meeting site. At that time, it was the largest auditorium of any African-American religious group in the United States. In 1951, he set up a "special commission" and selected Bishop A. B. McEwen, Bishop J. S. Bailey, and Bishop O.M. Kelly as his assistants to help with the administration and oversight of the church. In 1952, he added Bishop J. O. Patterson, Sr. to this commission. Also in 1952, Bishop Mason revised the constitution of COGIC to determine the leadership and succession of the church after his demise.

== Personal life ==
In 1890, Mason dated, courted, and married Alice Saxton, the daughter of one of his mother's friends. Two years later, they divorced, due to Saxton's disagreement over Mason's ministerial life. He remarried years later. Saxton would succumb to illness and die in 1904. A year after the death of his first wife, he courted and married Lelia Washington in 1905, and to this union were born seven children. In 1943, after the death of his second wife in 1936, he married his third and final wife, Elsie Washington (no relation to Leila Washington), who died in 2006. Bishop Mason died on November 17, 1961, in Detroit, MI at the age of 95. His funeral was held during the International Holy Convocation in Memphis and he was entombed in Mason Temple. He served as Senior Bishop of COGIC for 54 years and is recognized as one of the longest serving founders of a religious organization.

== Legacy ==
- By the time of Bishop Mason's death in 1961, COGIC had spread to every state in the Union and to many foreign countries; its membership was more than 400,000 and it had more than 4000 churches.
- In the early 21st century, it is the largest Pentecostal Church in the United States, with an estimated membership of more than 7 million members and 12,000 churches. located in every state in the Union.
- It is also located in more than 83 countries around the world. Its international membership is estimated to be between 1 and 3 million members and more than 25,000 churches. Its worldwide membership is estimated to be between 6 and 8 million members. COGIC began in 1907 with ten congregations in Mississippi, Arkansas, and Tennessee. The current leader and presiding bishop is Bishop J. Drew Sheard of Detroit, Michigan.
- The C. H. Mason Theological Seminary in Atlanta, Georgia, was founded in 1970 and named in his honor. It is part of the Interdenominational Theological Center (ITC). The C.H. Mason System of Bible Colleges in numerous US locations awards certificates and associate-level degrees in theology and ministry.
