= O. T. Jones Sr. =

American bishop (1891–1972)

Bishop Ozro Thurston Jones Sr.
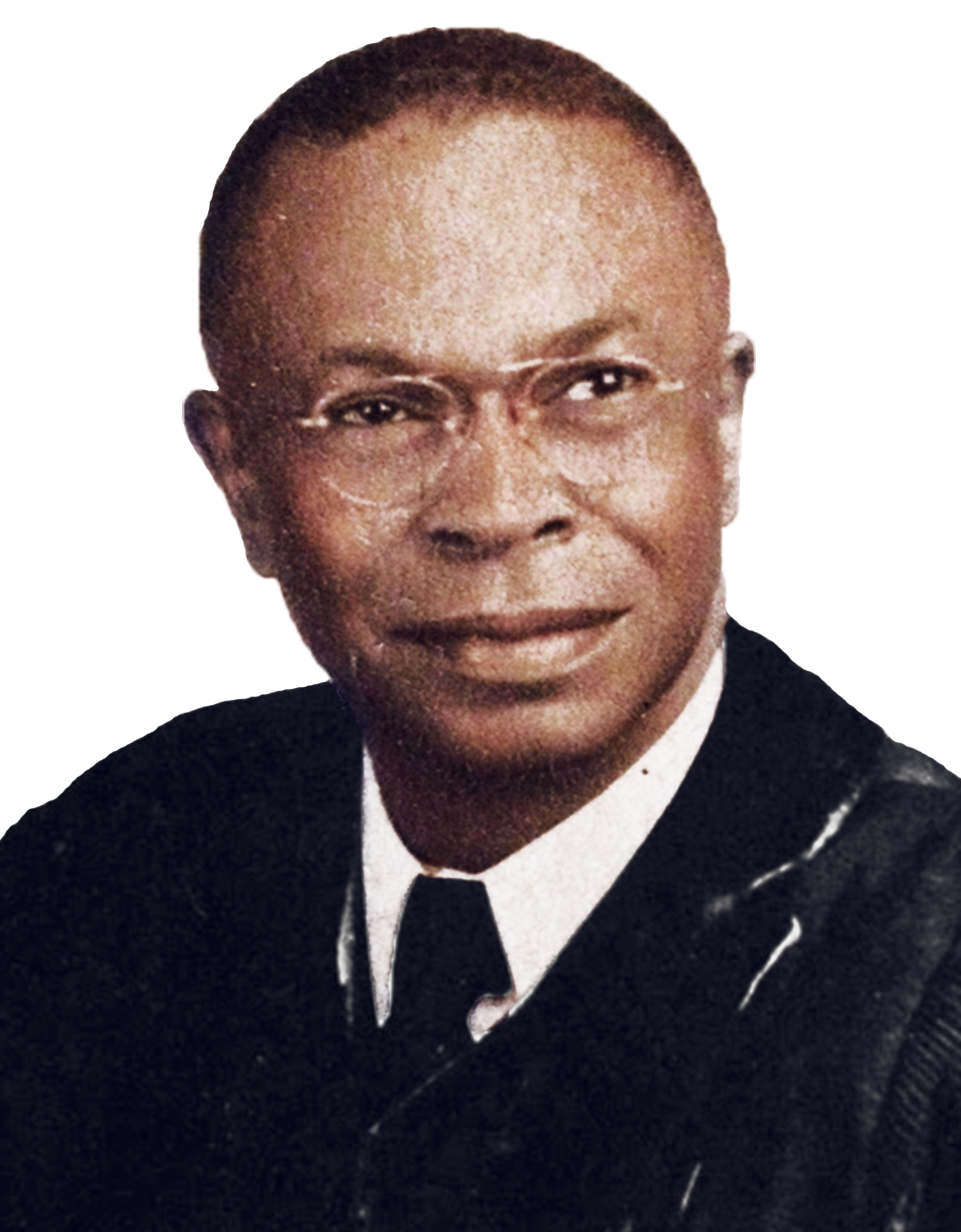
- Church: Church of God In Christ
- Diocese: Commonwealth of Pennsylvania
- In office: 1962-1968
- Predecessor: Charles Harrison Mason
- Successor: J. O. Patterson Sr.

Orders
- Ordination: 1912 (Elder Justice Bowe)
- Consecration: 1933 by Bishop Charles Harrison Mason

Personal details
- Born: March 26, 1891 Fort Smith, Arkansas, U.S.
- Died: September 23, 1972 (aged 81) Wynnewood, Pennsylvania, U.S.
- Spouse: Neanza Zelma Jones
- Children: 6
- Occupation: Senior Bishop, Church of God in Christ, Pastor, theologian, minister

Ozro Thurston Jones Sr. (March 26, 1891 – September 23, 1972) was a Holiness Pentecostal denomination leader and minister, who was the second Senior Bishop of the Church of God in Christ, Inc. (1962–1968), succeeding the denomination's founder, Bishop Charles Harrison Mason. The Church of God in Christ (COGIC) is the fourth largest denomination in the United States, being in the Holiness Pentecostal tradition.

== Early life and Ministerial Career ==
Ozro Thurston (O.T.) Jones was born in Fort Smith, Arkansas, to Baptist parents, Marion and Mary Jones. In 1912, Jones experienced and confessed salvation, sanctification, and "Spirit baptism" or "infilling", an experience in the Holiness and Pentecostal traditions often referred to as the works of grace. Jones would be ordained that year under the ministry of Elder Justus Bowe, a pioneer of the Church of God in Christ. Soon afterwards he and two of his siblings formed an evangelistic team focused in northern Arkansas and the surrounding states. Their evangelistic endeavors are credited with the establishment of 18 congregations. In 1914 Elder Jones organized the denomination's youth department, and served as its first president. In 1916 Jones became founding editor of Young People Willing Workers (Y.P.W.W.) Quarterly Topics, an education-oriented journal. In 1920 he was appointed assistant to the state overseer in Oklahoma.

== Pastoral, Overseer and Episcopal Ministry ==
In 1925, Jones became pastor of a small Holiness congregation in Philadelphia (Holy Temple COGIC), where he moved to and remained for the rest of his life. In 1926 he became the State Overseer for Pennsylvania (the precursor to Jurisdictional Bishop). Jones continued his work with the youth of the church, founding the denomination's International Youth Congress in 1928.

In 1933 Bishop Charles Harrison Mason, the founder of the Church of God in Christ, selected Jones as one of the five men to be consecrated as the denomination's first "founding" bishops. He was later selected to serve on the executive commission created by Mason to assist him during his last years in office. Following Mason's death in November 1961, the commission then headed by Bishop A.B. McEwen, administered the affairs of the church for one year. Then in late 1962, the Board of Bishops moved to nominate a new senior bishop. The Commission selected Jones and placed his name before the church's general assembly, which would approved the motion. Jones served concurrently as author/editor of the Y.P.W.W. Topics, and Jurisdictional Bishop of the Commonwealth of Pennsylvania.

== Senior Bishop of the Church of God in Christ ==
=== Preceding events, succession, and early tenure (1961-1962) ===
In 1951 Bishop Mason had formed a special commission (later called the Executive Commission) to assist him in the discharge of some of his duties, and appointed Bishop Jones to the body in 1955. Following Mason's death in 1961 the Commission administered the affairs of the denomination for an additional year, though Article 7 of the church's 1926 constitution stipulated, "...provided, however, that Elder C. H. Mason, the present Senior Bishop, shall retain his present power and authority during his life-time but upon his death said authority shall revert to the Board of Bishops." In 1962 the Board of Bishops nominated Jones, the sole surviving member of the five Bishop cohort Mason consecrated in 1933, to succeed Mason as Senior Bishop. The motion was subsequently approved by the General Assembly. While Senior Bishop, Jones additionally served as Jurisdictional Bishop of the Commonwealth of Pennsylvania, and author of Y.P.W.W. Topics.

=== Governance controversies (1963-1968) ===
Though Jones was appointed as Senior Bishop, the denomination's constitution was largely silent on the role independent of Mason himself, with Article 2 stating, "Nothing in this Constitution shall operate to deprive Elder C. H. Mason, 1121 Mississippi Avenue, Memphis, Tenn., the present Chief Apostle, Founder and Senior Bishop, of the authority he now holds as Chief Apostle of the Church of God in Christ." Multiple legal challenges to the denomination's governance began shortly after Jones' 1962 succession and continued through 1968.

In late 1963, members of the Executive Board filed in Chancery Court of Shelby County to prevent Jones from appointing and removing Jurisdictional Bishops without the board's approval. The court issued a preliminary injunction in The Executive Board of the Church of God in Christ vs. Bishop O.T. Jones, Sr., barring Jones from making unilateral appointments and removals pending a final resolution.

Following the church's General Assembly in November of 1964, the Executive Board filed against Jones in Pennsylvania and Tennessee concerning the legal basis of the office of Senior Bishop and control of church assets. The court issued a preliminary injunction resulting in Jones retaining the office or title of Senior Bishop, while legally restraining him from exercising financial and administrative authority without the Executive Board's consent. In response to the ongoing legal contentions, Bishop Jones filed a motion for stay and preliminary injunction with the U.S. Supreme Court in 1965. The court denied the motion, thereby returning the dispute to the Chancery Court in Tennessee.

In 1967 a plan for final resolution was reached, via a Consent Decree entered in the Chancery Court of Shelby County Tennessee. This court-ordered settlement suspended the unilateral executive powers of the Senior Bishop, created a constitutional drafting committee, and mandated the denomination to hold a constitutional convention in 1968.

=== Constitutional convention and post-abolition of office (1968-1972) ===
On January 30 1968, pursuant to the Consent Decree, Bishop Jones presided over the opening sessions of the Church of God in Christ's first constitutional convention. The convention established clear guidelines for the election of church leaders, which were held later that year. Subsequently, James Oglethorpe Patterson was elected as COGIC's first Presiding Bishop. This process abolished the office of Senior Bishop, effectively removing Bishop O. T. Jones Sr. as leader of the denomination.

Following the abolition of the office of Senior Bishop, Jones continued as Jurisdictional Bishop in Pennsylvania, and pastor of Holy Temple COGIC. Though several clergy and churches of the denomination were dissatisfied by Jones' treatment exited to form the Church of God in Christ, International, Jones remained in COGIC until his death in 1972.

== Personal life and death ==
In 1921, Jones married Neanza Williams in St. Louis, Missouri, and had six children: Dr. O. T. Jones Jr., Walter B. Jones, Dr. William V. Jones Sr., Mrs. Jean Anderson, Mrs. Elma Harriet Freeman and Mrs. Marian Ellison. Bishop Jones died on September 23, 1972, in Wynnewood, PA after a protracted illness, at age 81. His son, Dr. O. T. Jones Jr., succeeded him as Pastor of Holy Temple and became Jurisdictional Bishop of the Commonwealth of Pennsylvania Jurisdiction.
