= Mason Temple =

Building in Memphis, Tennessee, US

Coordinates: 35°7′17.5″N 90°2′57.6″W

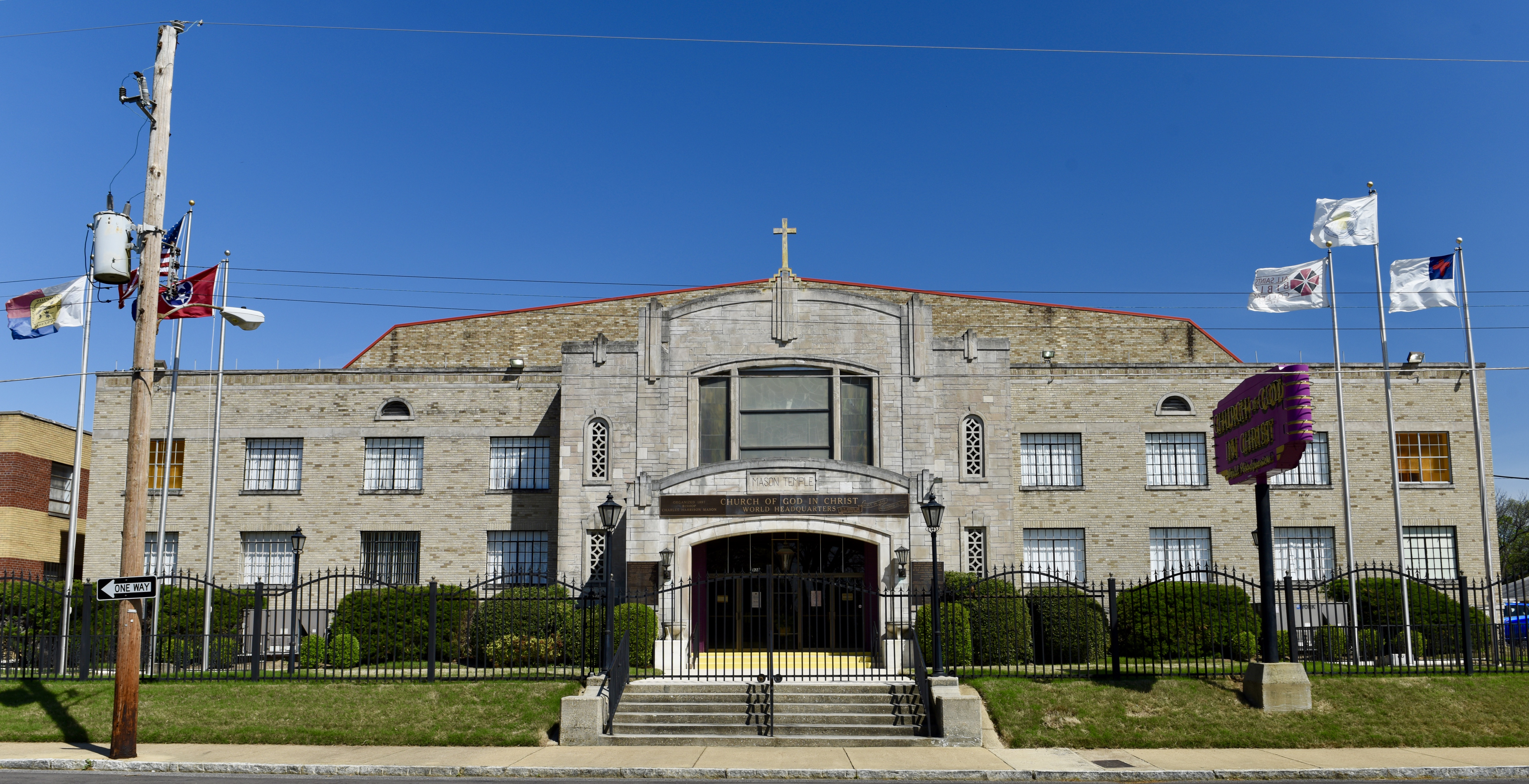
Mason Temple, Church of God in Christ Memphis, Tennessee

Mason Temple, located in Memphis, Tennessee, is a Christian international sanctuary and central headquarters of the Church of God in Christ, the largest African American Pentecostal group in the world. The building was named for Bishop Charles Harrison Mason, founder of the Church of God in Christ, who is entombed in a marble crypt inside the Temple.

Mason Temple was the site of Martin Luther King Jr.'s 1968 "I've Been to the Mountaintop" speech the night before his assassination.

== History ==
Mason Temple was founded by Charles Harrison Mason (1864–1961). This church's denomination, Church of God in Christ, also known as C.O.G.I.C, grew fast in Memphis, Tennessee and eventually spread to other parts of the world such as Latin America and Asia. Mason Temple was the largest church building owned by a predominantly black Christian denomination in the United States at its opening.

=== Charles H. Mason ===
Born in 1864 to former slaves, Mason founded the largest Pentecostal denomination in the U.S. which has more than 7.5 million members. Mason obtained a preaching license from Mount Gayle Missionary Baptist Church in Little Rock, Arkansas. He was then cast out for preaching about holiness and sanctification. With the help of exiled members, Mason established the Church of God in Christ. It consisted of 110 churches spread across Mississippi, Arkansas, Oklahoma, and Texas. Around that time, Mason attended the Azusa Street Revival where he was taught that he would receive the act of speaking in tongues once baptized in the Holy Spirit. On that night, he spoke in tongues.

After he returned, he found himself in a disagreement about the anointing of the Holy Spirit which led to another split in the church. He took 10 churches with him and kept the Church of God in Christ name.

Mason spent most of his years teaching in Arkansas. He came to Memphis in 1907 attend the first meeting of the Pentecostal General Assembly of the Church of God in Christ.

By 1997, the denomination grew to 5.2 million members.

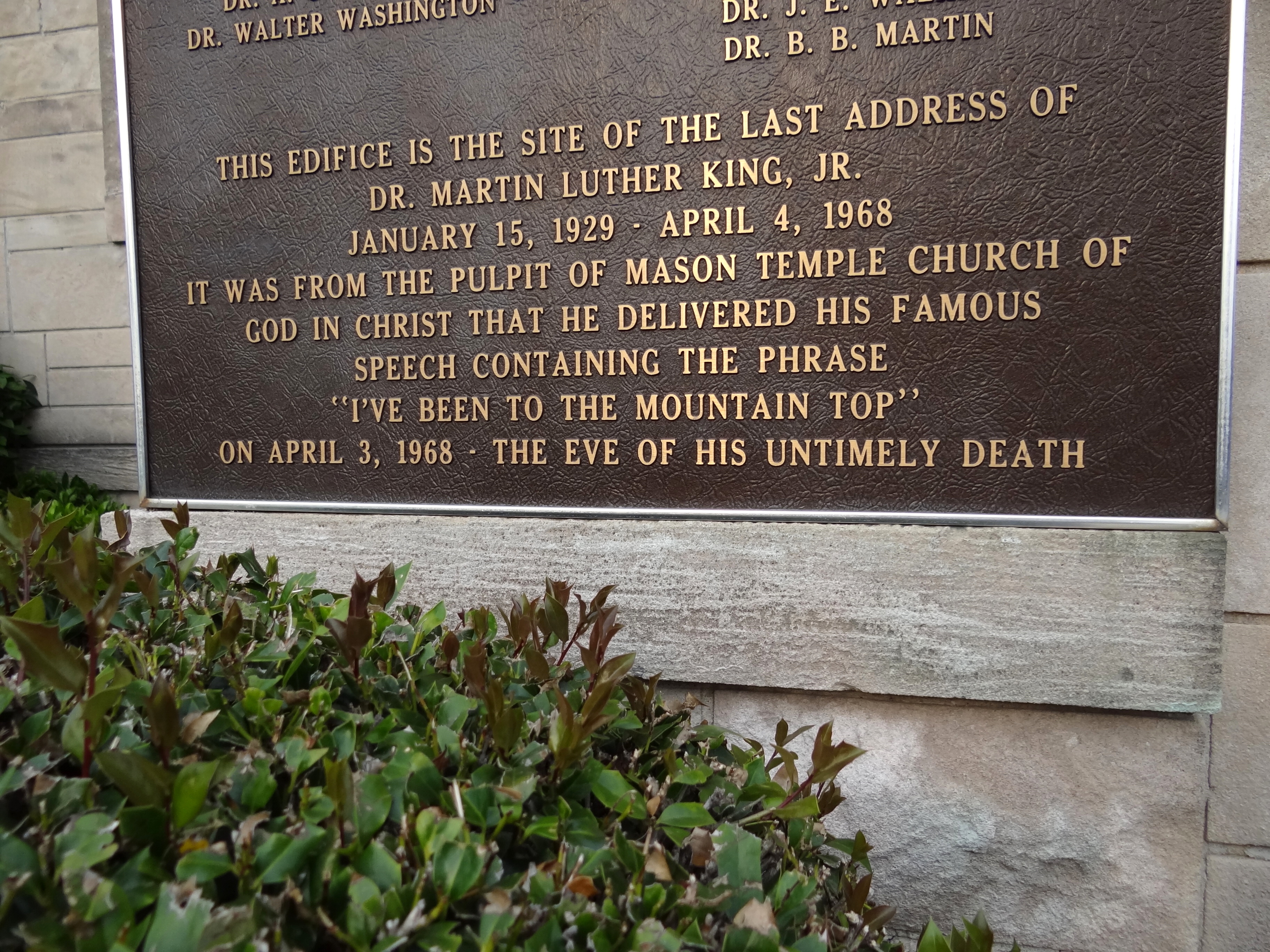
Historic marker outside Mason Temple

=== Civil Rights ===
In the 1950s and 1960s, Mason Temple became a critical destination for many civil rights events in Memphis. Martin Luther King Jr., Andrew Young, and Ralph Abernathy were among the many black leaders who came to Memphis to assist the 1,300 protesting sanitation workers who usually met at the church. Together, they fought for better working conditions for black sanitation workers as they earned low wages and were treated differently from the white workers. Martin Luther King Jr. later delivered his famous last speech: "I've Been to the Mountaintop" on April 3, 1968. The next day King was assassinated outside of his room at the Lorraine Motel. A plaque on an exterior wall near the entrance to the church details the event.

== Construction ==
Charles H. Mason started building Mason Temple in 1940 to replace the original "Tabernacle" which burned down in 1936. He assigned Riley F. Williams as the chairman of the building commission, Ulysses Ellis Miller as the supervisor of construction, and Henry Taylor as the architect. When construction of the Temple began, the church didn't have much in its building-fund treasury, so members and local citizens helped the church raise enough money to fund the making of the new temple.

Mason Temple is a three-story building made from brick, stone, steel, and concrete. The main auditorium seated five thousand people while the balcony and the assembly room could sit up to two thousand people each. The building included a salon, nursery, baggage-check registration room, photographic booth, first aid and emergency ward, and also a post office.
