= F. D. Washington =

20th-century American Pentecostal bishop

Bishop F. D. Washington

Personal details
- Born: January 1, 1913 United States
- Died: January 12, 1988 (aged 75) Brooklyn, New York
- Denomination: Church of God in Christ
- Residence: Brooklyn, New York, United States
- Spouse: Ernestine Beatrice Washington (until her death in 1983)
- Occupation: Bishop, Pastor, Evangelist, Radio Personality

Frederick Douglas Washington (January 1, 1913 – January 12, 1988) was a Pentecostal minister of the Washington Temple Church of God in Christ in Brooklyn, New York. His most famous protégé is Rev. Al Sharpton, who acknowledged his call as a minister at the age of nine.

== Biographical sketch ==
Named for civil rights leader Frederick Douglass, Washington was born on January 1, 1913, in Hot Springs, Arkansas. His parent founded White Lily Church Of God In Christ. When his father passed the church was renamed Washington Memorial Church Of God In Christ. His mother, Jessie B. Washington served as the State Supervisor of the Department of Women for Arkansas Second Jurisdiction Church Of God In Christ.

He later served as a pastor for a church in Montclair, New Jersey. With his wife, Madame Ernestine Beatrice Washington, who was called "The Songbird of the East" Washington moved to Brooklyn, New York to set up a tent at 966 Fulton Street. This ministry was known as "The Sawdust Trail".

From there Washington's ministry grew until he was able to purchase the old Loews Theatre that stood at 1372 Bedford Avenue. Eventually, Washington Temple COGIC, with over 5,000 members, became one of the largest congregations of any Christian denomination located in Brooklyn, New York. Washington served as assistant Jurisdictional Prelate to Bishop O. M. Kelly before finally succeeding him in 1983. He also served on the General Board of the Church Of God In Christ as Second Assistant Presiding Bishop to Bishop J. O. Patterson Sr.

In addition to his early work with Sharpton, Washington also served as a mentor and spiritual father to many COGIC pastors. Included among these are Bishop Norman L. Prescott, the prelate of New Jersey's Third Ecclesiastical Jurisdiction and pastor of Washington's former church in Montclair; Superintindent Robert L. Madison of Washington Temple; Elder TJ Williams Jr. of First COGIC of Bridgehampton, NY; Rev. Timothy Wright; Elder Stanley Williams of Grace Temple COGIC in Westbury, NY; Elder Odolph Wright of City Of Faith COGIC (New York and Georgia); and Elder Michael Collymore (North Carolina). Washington also introduced Sharpton to William Augustus Jones Jr., who converted Sharpton to his current Baptist faith.

Washington died in January 1988. He was succeeded as bishop by Ithiel Clemmons and as pastor by Elder Robert L. Madison.
