= William Augustus Jones Jr. =

American clergyman (1934–2006)

William Augustus Jones Jr. (February 24, 1934 – February 4, 2006) was an American Civil Rights leader and minister.

== Biography ==
William Augustus Jones Jr. was born in Louisville, Kentucky, to Mary Elisabeth Jones and William Augustus Jones Sr. His life was considered to began as a medical miracle. It was said that he was not expected to be born alive because of a traumatic childbirth. Jones reflecting upon the story of his birth once said: "All of my days have been lived with the feeling that Divine Providence has upheld, sustained and directed my destiny."

Jones graduated with honors in sociology from the University of Kentucky, though he could not play basketball because African Americans were barred from the team. He earned a doctorate from Crozer Theological Seminary in Chester, Pennsylvania. While studying at Crozer, Jones worshipped at the Calvary Baptist Church and became known as one of the "Sons of Calvary" along with Martin Luther King Jr. and Samuel D. Proctor, who all went on to become well known preachers in the Black Church. He enlisted in the United States Army in 1954 as a Private and was discharged in 1956 as a First Lieutenant.

As a young Minister, Jones was taught by BG Crawley, who was his pioneer and known as "The Walking Encyclopedia" to Baptist Ministers across the nation. Crawley was a Judge and founder of Little Zion Baptist Church of Brooklyn, New York.

Jones joined Martin Luther King Jr. in 1961, splitting from conservative Baptist churches and forming the Progressive National Baptist Convention. He was known for being an outspoken and prophetic critic. In the 1960s, Al Sharpton, a Pentecostal minister at the time, was introduced to Jones. F. D. Washington. Jones became a mentor to Sharpton, and eventually Sharpton became part of the Baptist denomination.

For 43 years, Jones served as minister at Bethany Baptist, a 5,000-member church in the Bedford-Stuyvesant neighborhood of Brooklyn, and hosted a syndicated weekly radio program called Bethany Hour. The Bethany Hour was also broadcast weekly on the syndicated Family Radio program hosted by the late Harold Camping. In 1979, Jones published a book entitled God in the Ghetto.

== See also ==
Jennifer Jones Austin - Daughter

== Sources ==
- The life and ministry of Jones as recounted in part by Jones in his Spiritual Autobiography, 1972.
