= Timothy Wright =

American gospel singer and pastor (1947 - 2009)

Timothy Wright (June 17, 1947 – April 24, 2009), generally credited as Rev. Timothy Wright or Reverend Timothy Wright on recordings, was an American gospel singer and pastor.

== Biography ==
Timothy Wright started on piano at age 12, and sang and composed for his church choir as a teenager at the St. John's Fire Baptized Holiness Church of God in Brooklyn. He played piano for Bishop F. D. Washington and Isaac Douglas in the 1960s and 1970s, including on recordings, and he formed his own gospel ensemble in the mid-1970s, the Timothy Wright Concert Choir. He eventually became pastor of the Pentecostal Grace Tabernacle Christian Center Church of God in Christ located in Crown Heights, Brooklyn, and issued albums regularly from 1990.

Wright's 1994 album Come Thou Almighty King, with the New York Fellowship Mass Choir, made Billboard’s Top 20 chart for gospel albums and was nominated for a Grammy Award for Best Traditional Soul Gospel Album, as was his 1999 release Been There Done That. On the heels of this success, Wright and the New York Fellowship Mass Choir appeared in a 1995 episode of the television show New York Undercover.

On July 4, 2008, Wright was critically injured in a car crash on Interstate 80 in Pennsylvania that killed his wife and grandson as well as the driver of the oncoming car. He died April 24, 2009, as a result of these injuries, at the age of 61.

== Discography ==
Title	Release date	Label	U.S. Top Gospel Albums Peak
Praise Him	1975	-	
Sunshine In My Soul	1976	-	
Do You Know The Light	1979	-	
Movin' in The Spirit	1980		-
Testify	1983		
Live At Washington Temple C.O.G.I.C.	1985		14
Hallelujah Is Highest Praise	1987		4
Jesus Will	1987		19
Just Believe	1989		-
Living in a World	1988		38
Who's on the Lord's Side	1989		3
I'm Glad About It	1992		4
We Need a Miracle	1993		20
Come Thou Almighty King	1994		10
Moving in the Spirit	1995		-
Live From London	1996		36
Let Freedom Ring	1997		-
Been There Done That	1999		-
Story to Tell	1999		-
I Here Music	2002		-
Live in New York	2003		-
Let's Celebrate (He Is Risen)	2005		-
Jesus, Jesus, Jesus	2007		13
Godfather of Gospel	2009		-
