= I've Been to the Mountaintop =

Final speech by Martin Luther King Jr., 1968

"I've Been to the Mountaintop"
Final 30 seconds of "I've Been to the Mountaintop" speech by Martin Luther King Jr. – the final words of his last public speech.

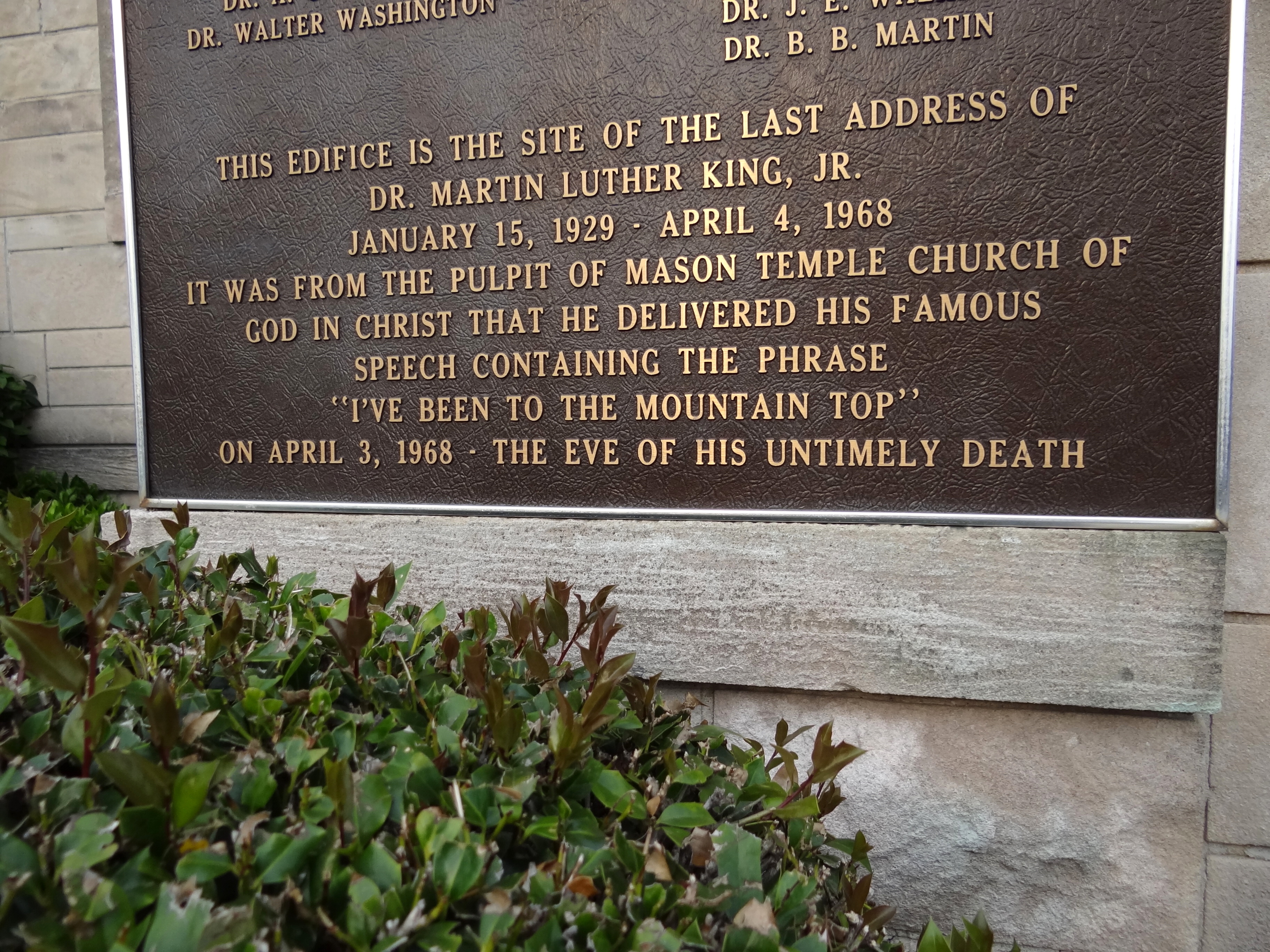
The plaque outside the site of the speech, Mason Temple in Memphis, Tennessee

"I've Been to the Mountaintop" is the popular name of the final speech delivered by Martin Luther King Jr. on April 3, 1968, at the Mason Temple (Church of God in Christ Headquarters) in Memphis, Tennessee.

The speech primarily concerns the Memphis sanitation strike. King calls for unity, economic actions, boycotts, and nonviolent protest, while challenging the United States to live up to its ideals. At the end of the speech, he discusses the possibility of an untimely death (he was assassinated the next day). A storm that night in Memphis can plainly be heard outside the church. King allows the thunder to punctuate his words at several points during the speech.

== Excerpts from King's speech ==
Regarding the strike, King stated that

The issue is injustice. The issue is the refusal of Memphis to be fair and honest in its dealings with its public servants, who happen to be sanitation workers.

He warned the protesters not to engage in violence lest the issue of injustice be ignored because of the focus on the violence. King argued that peaceful demonstrations were the best course of action, the only way to guarantee that their demands would be heard and answered.

Regarding the Civil Rights Movement, King demanded that the United States defend all its citizens as promised in the United States Constitution and the Declaration of Independence and stated that he would never give up until these natural rights were protected, saying

Somewhere I read of the freedom of assembly. Somewhere I read of the freedom of speech. Somewhere I read of the freedom of press. Somewhere I read that the greatness of America is the right to protest for right. And so just as I said, we aren't going to let dogs or water hoses turn us around. We aren't going to let any injunction turn us around. We are going on.

Regarding economic boycotts, King advocated boycotting white goods as a means of nonviolent protest. He said that the individual Negro is poor but together they are an economic powerhouse, and they should use this power to stop support for racist groups and instead empower black businesses. Although the industries might not listen to protests, they would be forced to listen to boycotts lest they be driven out of business. King named several businesses as targets for the boycott:

Go out and tell your neighbors not to buy Coca-Cola in Memphis. Go by and tell them not to buy Sealtest milk. Tell them not to buy – what is the other bread? Wonder Bread. And what is the other bread company, Jesse? Tell them not to buy Hart's bread. As Jesse Jackson has said, up to now, only the garbage men have been feeling pain; now we must kind of redistribute the pain.

In another message advocating unity and shared burdens, King invoked the biblical story of the Parable of the Good Samaritan, in which a wounded Jewish traveler is rescued by a Samaritan, despite the tension between their respective ethnoreligious groups. This story had been of interest to King and his work in the Civil Rights Movement for at least half a decade before this point due to its directive to look past the demographic characteristics of someone in need, or the impact helping another may have on one's own life, and prioritize the moral ideal of Love Thy Neighbor.

And so the first question that the priest asked -- the first question that the Levite asked was, "If I stop to help this man, what will happen to me?" But then the Good Samaritan came by. And he reversed the question: "If I do not stop to help this man, what will happen to him?" That's the question before you tonight. Not, "If I stop to help the sanitation workers, what will happen to my job. Not, "If I stop to help the sanitation workers what will happen to all of the hours that I usually spend in my office every day and every week as a pastor?" The question is not, "If I stop to help this man in need, what will happen to me?" The question is, "If I do not stop to help the sanitation workers, what will happen to them?" That's the question.

Toward the end of the speech, King referred to threats against his life and used language that prophetically foreshadowed his impending death, but reaffirmed his audience that he was not afraid to die for what he believed in. He finishes with a quotation from Julia Howe's Battle Hymn Of The Republic, in italics:

Well, I don't know what will happen now. We've got some difficult days ahead. But it really doesn't matter with me now, because I've been to the mountaintop. And I don't mind. Like anybody, I would like to live a long life; longevity has its place. But I'm not concerned about that now. I just want to do God's will. And He's allowed me to go up to the mountain. And I've looked over. And I've seen the Promised Land! I may not get there with you, but I want you to know tonight, that we, as a people, will get to the Promised Land! So I'm happy tonight, I'm not worried about anything! I'm not fearing any man! Mine eyes have seen the glory of the coming of the Lord!

== Biblical references ==
The 'prophetic' language used by King referred to events described in the Biblical book of Deuteronomy. In it, Moses, the leader of the people of Israel, leads them to life in the Promised Land. Before they reach it, however, Moses is informed by God that, because of an incident in which he did not believe God (Numbers 20:12), he will not reach the land himself, but will only see it from a distance.

Then Moses climbed Mount Nebo ... There the Lord showed him the whole land ... Then the Lord said to him, "This is the land I promised on oath to Abraham, Isaac and Jacob ... I will let you see it with your eyes, but you will not cross over into it."

— Deuteronomy 34:1–4

Shortly after, Moses dies, and his successor Joshua leads them into the Promised Land.

== See also ==
- The Mountaintop (play about King's last day)
- Bibliography of Martin Luther King Jr.
