= Denver Heights, West Virginia =

Unincorporated community in West Virginia, United States

Denver Heights
- Unincorporated community
- Location within the state of West Virginia Denver Heights (the United States)
- Coordinates: 39°43′56″N 80°32′41″W
- Country: United States
- State: West Virginia
- County: Marshall
- Elevation: 1,476 ft (450 m)
- Time zone: UTC-5 (Eastern (EST))
  - Summer (DST): UTC-4 (EDT)
- GNIS ID: 1554293

Denver Heights is an unincorporated community in Marshall County, West Virginia, United States.
