= Denver Heights COGIC =

Pentecostal church in San Antonio, Texas, US

Coordinates: 29.411385°N 98.468578°W

Denver Heights COGIC, also known as The Mother Church, is a Pentecostal church in San Antonio, Texas. It has historical significance since it is one of the first churches in the United States to be founded after the Azusa Street Revival that took place in Los Angeles, California on April 14, 1906. The participants received criticism from secular media and Christian Theologians for behaviors considered outrageous and unorthodox at the time. Today, the revival is considered by historians to be the primary catalyst for the spread of Pentecostalism in the 20th century. Denver Heights is considered to be the birthplace of modern-day Pentecostalism in San Antonio and South Texas.

The church currently is affiliated with the Texas Southwest Jurisdiction of the Churches of God in Christ. Denver Heights COGIC works with the Greater Alamo District for regional representation and participates on a Jurisdictional, National, and International Level.

== History ==
Pastor F. C. V. Foard came to San Antonio in the fall of 1913 from Hearne, Texas at the age of 27. He preached and taught Christianity on street corners, in tents, and any place he could find.

While the present building was under construction at 512 Dreiss Street in San Antonio, services were held in a nearby building. Before the land was purchased for the church, Elder Foard and approximately twenty members moved the services to 103 Roberts Street on the Westside of San Antonio, Texas (Which is now West End Church of God in Christ) in the summer of 1917. In 1920, Elder Foard and many of the members returned to Denver Heights and held services in a leased building on Iowa and Mesquite. The church was called “The First Church” and they remained until the present building had been constructed. Denver Heights has had several Pastors lead after Pastor F. C. V. Foard including: Elder R. M. Paige, Bishop E. E. Hamilton, Elder E. D. Childress, Superintendent N. R. Henderson, and Elder L. C. Smith.

In addition to the contributions of these leaders, many members played a role in furthering the causes of the ministry at Denver Heights COGIC. These members included: Mother Montgomery, Sister Dobbins, Sister Milvin Biser, Missionary E. Moore, Sister Nellie McNeal, Sister Eva Allen, Deacon Chester Byrd, Bishop Grady, Superintendent Grant, Bishop R. E. Ranger, Superintendent Crawford, Elder G. T. Garcia, Superintendent Bell.

After the demise of Elder L. C. Smith, Bishop Thaddeus D. Iglehart installed Elder J. B. Pope Jr. as the pastor of “The Mother Church”. Under the pastorate of Pope, significant renovations are being completed on the 90-year-old building.

Pastor J. B. Pope Jr. made significant improvements to the infrastructure and overall mission of the Denver Heights COGIC. He died in July 2015. Bishop Samuel E. Iglehart appointed Pope's eldest son, Elder Joseph Pope, the new pastor of Denver Heights COGIC. Joseph Pope continues the work at Denver Heights COGIC.
