= Joseph H. Jackson =

American pastor (1900–1990)

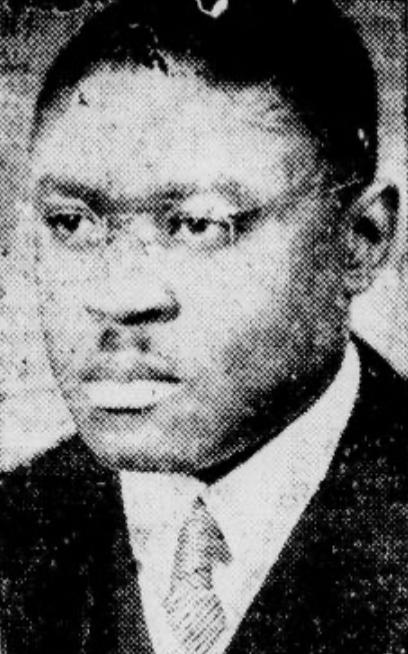
- Jackson in a 1949 publication
- Born: January 11, 1900; Rudyard, Mississippi, U.S.
- Died: August 18, 1990 (aged 90); Chicago, Illinois, U.S.
- Occupations: Baptist Pastor, denominational leader
- Children: Kenny J. Williams

Joseph Harrison Jackson (January 11, 1900 – August 18, 1990) was an American pastor and the longest serving President of the National Baptist Convention, USA.

The Civil Rights Movement of the 1950s and 1960s was highly controversial in many black churches, where the minister preached spiritual salvation rather than political activism. The National Baptist Convention became deeply split; Jackson had supported the Montgomery bus boycott of 1956, but by 1960 he told his denomination they should not become involved in civil rights activism. Jackson was based in Chicago and was a close ally of Mayor Richard J. Daley and the Chicago Democratic machine against the efforts of Martin Luther King Jr. In the end, Jackson prevailed. Yet, surprisingly, it was a former son of Olivet [pastored by J. H. Jackson] L. Venchael Booth, whom Jackson would later install as pastor of First Baptist Church of Gary in September 1944, who issued the founding call for what became a rival group, Progressive National Baptist Convention. The PNBC became the "household of the civil rights movement among Black Baptists," and the frontline supporters of the extensive activism of the King's Southern Christian Leadership Conference. Jackson's vocal stance for "civil rights through law and order" went in direct opposition to the methods of civil disobedience advocated by King.

== Life and ministry ==
=== Early life and education ===
Jackson was born on January 11, 1900, on a farm near Rudyard, Mississippi, where he taught himself spelling, reading, and arithmetic while working in the pasture and completing chores. He began preaching at a young age in the rural Coahoma and Bolivar Counties in Mississippi. He pursued a bachelor's degree from Jackson College, which later became Jackson State University. He went on to receive a bachelor of divinity from Colgate-Rochester Divinity School and a master's of education from Creighton University. He also completed advanced masters work in theology at the University of Chicago. Jackson received honorary degrees from Wilberforce University, the College of Monrovia, and Jackson State University.

=== Pastoral ministry ===
Jackson was the minister of Bethel Baptist Church in Omaha, Nebraska, and elected president of the Nebraska Baptist State Association. From 1934 to 1941, Jackson was the minister of Monumental Baptist Church in Philadelphia, Pennsylvania. In 1941, Jackson was called to pastor the historic Olivet Baptist Church on Chicago's South Side, where he served until his death in 1990. During his close to fifty year leadership at Olivet Baptist Church the membership in the congregation grew from approximately 10,000 to more than 20,000. During Jackson's role as pastor, he was involved in ecumenism. In 1937 and 1948 Jackson attended the planning conferences to establish the World Council of Churches, making him a charter member of the council. During his service as pastor of Olivet Baptist Church, Jackson remained involved in his denomination through maintaining presidency of the National Baptist Convention, USA, Inc. (NBC) for twenty-nine years. He also remained politically active on the local, state, and national levels. In addition to his ministry and involvement with the NBC, Jackson traveled throughout the world on numerous religious missions, served as vice president of the Baptist World Alliance, and was a member of the Central Committee of the World Council of Churches.

=== National Baptist Convention, USA, Inc. (NBC) ===
From 1935 to 1941, Jackson was secretary of the Foreign Mission Board of the NBC. Following the retirement of D. V. Jemison from the presidency of the NBC in 1953, Jackson was elected president. Jackson served longer than any of his predecessors, holding office for 29 years. Under Jackson's leadership, one of the NBC's achievements included the purchase of a Freedom Farm in Tennessee to provide a haven for Black farmers. These farmers were divested of their land in the civil rights revolution. Yet, Differing concepts about engagement in the Civil Rights struggle and of term limitations for the president led to a division within the NBC. This division resulted in the formation of the Progressive National Baptist Convention (PNBC).

=== Controversy ===
A group led by Gardner C. Taylor including Martin Luther King Sr. and Jr.; Ralph David Abernathy Sr., Benjamin Mays, and L. Venchael Booth (a Cincinnati, Ohio pastor) filed suit against Jackson, accusing him of violating the denomination's constitution. They accused him of ignoring the four-term limitation of NBC president as stated in the constitution. The court decided in Jackson's favor and at the annual convention meeting in Philadelphia in 1960, Jackson was installed to a fifth term as president. In response to Jackson's reelection, Taylor's group demanded a roll call, but instead the meeting was adjourned. The dispute was once again taken to court, and the court again sided with Jackson. He remained as president of the convention. The events of the next annual meeting in Kansas City, Missouri were among the most memorable in the organization's history. During that meeting Taylor's group attempted to secure control of the podium to compel a head count for the organization's presidency but Jackson's group blocked access to the podium. During the dispute, the Rev. A. G. Wright of Detroit fell four feet from the stage to the auditorium floor, resulting in a concussion that caused him to lose his life days later. The proceedings returned to order only after the Mayor of Kansas City, Harold Roe Bartle, appealed to the clergymen to cease fighting. Following the meeting, Jackson pointedly denounced the nonviolent civil rights movement, including the Student Nonviolent Coordinating Committee and the Congress of Racial Equality. He removed Martin Luther King Jr. from the vice-presidency of the Baptist Training Union and Sunday School Congress.[3]

In response, Taylor and his group met together in 1961 at Zion Baptist Church in Cincinnati, where they organized the Progressive National Baptist Convention. About half a million NBC members ended up leaving the NBC for the new group.[1] Jackson continued as president of the NBC until September 1982, when he was unseated by the long-serving General Secretary of the convention, T. J. Jemison, the son of Jackson's predecessor.[6]

=== Views on civil rights and society ===
During a 1970 Time interview, Jackson said that, "The most important thing now, is to save the nation, in order to save the individual citizen, and the race." By "save the nation" he meant that if one person was enslaved the society would also be enslaved or at the very least "polluted."

During his September 10, 1964, speech delivered at the 84th Annual Session of the NBC in Detroit, Michigan, Jackson explained his views on civil rights and society. He quoted Abraham Lincoln to support his statement about the importance of saving a nation. Jackson noted Lincoln's statement that, "By giving freedom to the slaves we insure freedom to the free." Jackson followed this by stating, "The presence of one bound man pollutes the whole stream of human society; and the rattle of one chain of oppression creates a discord that breaks the harmony in every democratic system, and disturbs the mind and poisons the heart of every man with fear and dread, so that the would-be master finds himself mentally and morally the dweller in the hovels of slaves, the servant of a cause that is hostile to democracy, and becomes himself, the victim of the baser emotions of his own nature."

According to Dylan C. Penningroth:

Jackson has gone down in history as a Baptist dictator, the "law and order" conservative who kept the world's biggest Black religious organization on the sidelines of the Black freedom struggle. But Jackson was not a simpleminded reactionary. He had a deep faith in law's power to advance Black interest, a faith rooted in his youth in the Jim Crow South, when Black people had exercised common law civil rights routinely. His point was quite specific: sit ins and tenement take-overs undermine property rights without regard for owners’ right to “due process.”

Jackson believed that African Americans would obtain civil rights "through law and order" by remaining in the mainstream of American democracy. He believed that American problems could be solved through the laws of the land and through obedience to the American philosophy and way of life. Jackson believed that as long as America was guided by logic and law this home of the Federal Constitution and land of due process would allow for fair treatment of all. Jackson believed in the power of the voting ballot as the "most important weapon" through which vital decisions were made. In this 1964 speech Jackson concluded the speech with six suggestions for the American Negro regarding the Civil Rights Movement.

Jackson believed that a great church could not be built preaching hate, envy, revenge, and sending the people out on the street after the service mad at the world. He went on to declare that "no matter how nonviolent, civil disobedience lays the ground for civil hatred and the desire to destroy".

In 1968, Jackson was proclaimed "Patriot of the Year" by right wing segregationist Billy James Hargis, in recognition of Jackson's outspoken law-and-order stance.

=== Philanthropy ===
In 1983, Jackson gave $50,000 to Jackson State University to establish the Joseph H. Jackson Fund for a lecture series and scholarship award program. His additional philanthropy went to schools including Hampton University, Howard University, Edward Waters College, and Meharry Medical College.

=== Death ===
Joseph Harrison Jackson died on August 18, 1990, aged 90, at Chicago Osteopathic Hospital in Chicago following a lengthy illness. At the time of his death, he was still serving as pastor of Olivet Baptist Church. He was survived by his wife Maude Thelma Jackson and daughter Kenny J. Williams.

== Works ==
=== Published works ===
- Stars in the night: Report on a visit to Germany, Christian Education Press, 1950
- The Eternal Flame: The Story of a Preaching Mission in Russia, Christian Education Press, 1956
- Many but One: The Ecumenics of Charity, Sheed and Ward, 1964
- Unholy Shadows and Freedom's Holy Light, Nashville: Townsend Press, 1967
- Nairobi, a Joke, a Junket or a Journey? Nashville: Townsend Press, 1976
- A Story of Christian Activism: The History of the National Baptist Convention, U.S.A., Inc., Nashville: Townsend Press, 1980

=== Speeches ===
- Address to the 84th Session of the National Baptist Convention, September 10, 1964

== See also ==
- National Baptist Convention, USA, Inc.
