= Johnnie Jones (lawyer) =

Louisiana state legislator (1919–2022)

Johnnie A. Jones

Member of the Louisiana House of Representatives from East Baton Rouge Parish
- In office 1972–1976 Serving with Arthur F. Abadie, Richard Baker, Warren Davis Folkes, E. Clark Gaudin, Woody Jenkins, Kevin P. Reilly, Frank P. Simoneaux, Richard Turnley

Personal details
- Born: Johnnie Anderson Jones; November 30, 1919 Baton Rouge, Louisiana, U.S.
- Died: April 23, 2022 (aged 102) Jackson, Louisiana, U.S.
- Party: Democratic
- Education: Southern University
- Occupation: Warrant officer; Civil rights attorney; State legislator

Johnnie Anderson Jones Sr. (November 30, 1919 – April 23, 2022) was an American politician, soldier, and civil rights attorney associated with the 1953 Baton Rouge bus boycott, the first anti-segregation bus boycott, in Baton Rouge, Louisiana. This was a precursor to the 1955 Montgomery bus boycott led by Martin Luther King Jr. in Montgomery, Alabama.

Jones was the second African American U.S. Army warrant officer. In 2021, he received a Purple Heart, 77 years after he was injured by shrapnel during Operation Overlord, the D-Day invasion of Omaha Beach in World War II. He later served as a member of the Louisiana House of Representatives, from 1972 to 1976.

== Early life ==
Johnnie Anderson Jones was born November 30, 1919, in Laurel Hill, Louisiana, in West Feliciana Parish, three miles south of the Mississippi line near Woodville, Mississippi. One of eight children, he was the son of lease cropping farmers Henry E. Jones (born December 5, 1876) and Sarah Ann Coats (also spelled Costes), and the paternal great-grandson of Emily Bowers, a formerly enslaved mixed-race African American passing as white.

Jones attended elementary school up to the sixth grade at West Feliciana Parish school board system. Jones' parents were considered one of the most successful African American farmers in the area. Jones attended high school at the Southern University Demonstration School (now known as Southern Lab). Prior to joining the military, he attended Southern University.

== Military career ==
While attending Southern University, Jones was drafted into the U.S. Army in 1943. He was assigned to the 494th Port Battalion, an all-African American port battalion attached to the 6th Engineer Special Brigade that took part in Operation Overlord leading to the invasion of Normandy, France, (D-Day) at Omaha Beach. Jones served as a warrant officer responsible for leading a unit unloading equipment and supplies onto Omaha Beach. Jones was the first African American warrant officer (Junior Grade) in the U.S. Army.

Jones landed on Omaha Beach in the third wave of the Normandy invasion on D Day, June 7, 1944. He was injured on Omaha Beach, sustaining a back injury from his ship hitting a mine, and receiving shrapnel wounds to the neck from German air attacks and German sniper rounds. Around 2,000 African-American troops took part in the Normandy invasion in several different roles.

Jones continued to serve during World War II, fighting in the Northern France campaign on the Western Front at the Battle of the Bulge, the largest battle ever fought by the U.S. Army and a major factor in bringing about the end of WWII.

On June 26, 2021, the U.S. Army awarded Jones a Purple Heart, 77 years after he was injured by shrapnel injuries during the D-Day invasion of Omaha Beach during World War II. The ceremony, held at the Old State Capitol in Baton Rouge, was attended by various dignitaries including retired Lt. General Russel L. Honore, Joey Strickland, secretary of the Louisiana Department of Veterans Affairs, and U.S. Senator Bill Cassidy who pinned the Purple Heart medal onto Jones' jacket. General James McConville, the Chief of Staff of the U.S. Army, commended Jones in writing, noting "We owe you (Mr. Jones) a debt of gratitude, both for your sacrifices during World War II and for being a role model for African Americans aspiring to serve.”

=== Awards ===
- Purple Heart
- European-African-Middle Eastern Campaign Medal with two bronze stars and one bronze arrowhead
- American Campaign Medal
- World War II Victory Medal
- Legion of Honour (Chevalier rank)
- Croix de Guerre with Palm from France

== Police beating, law career, and Baton Rouge bus boycott ==
After returning home from World War II, Jones was beaten by a sheriff during a traffic stop while on his way to New Orleans, Louisiana, to have a piece of shrapnel surgically removed from his neck.

Jones earned a bachelor's degree from Southern University. In 1953, he earned a law degree from Southern University. Fifteen days after law school graduation, T.J. Jemison, Mt. Zion First Baptist Church of Baton Rouge minister and civil rights leader, recruited him to represent people arrested during the two-week Baton Rouge bus boycott, a precursor to the Montgomery bus boycott led by Martin Luther King Jr. During the Civil Rights movement, he leaped from his car before a Ku Klux Klan car bomb exploded.

Jones practiced law until the age of 93, representing clients on numerous matters including civil rights legal cases, and served as the Assistant Parish Attorney for East Baton Rouge Parish from 1968 to 1972. He successfully fought for pay equity for teachers; sued to desegregate local parks, pools, amusement centers, schools, and courtrooms; represented Southern University student-protesters during the Civil Rights movement; guarded the constitutional rights of indigent defendants; and challenged voter discrimination practices. He was the first African-American member of the Baton Rouge Bar Association.

Jones co-wrote On the Road to Equality with Dorothy Kendrick and was interviewed for the Louisiana Civil Rights Movement Oral History Project by the Louisiana Library Center for Oral History.

== State legislator ==
In 1972, Jones was elected to the Louisiana House of Representatives for East Baton Rouge Parish. In 1976, he lost his bid for reelection.

== Later life ==
Jones became a centenarian in 2019. On the morning of April 23, 2022, he died in a Jackson veteran's facility, aged 102.
