= Kenny J. Williams =

African American scholar and author (1927–2003)

- Born: September 4, 1927; Omaha, Nebraska
- Died: December 19, 2003 (aged 76); Durham, North Carolina
- Occupations: Academic; author
- Parent: Joseph Harrison Jackson

Academic background
- Education: Benedict College (B.A.); DePaul University (M.A.); University of Pennsylvania (M.A., PhD)
- Thesis: An Evolution of the New Chicago from the Old: A Study of Henry Blake Fuller's Chicago Novels

Academic work
- Discipline: Midwestern literature African American literature
- Institutions: Tennessee Agricultural & Industrial State College; Northeastern Illinois University; Duke University

Kenny Jackson Williams (September 4, 1927 – December 19, 2003) was an African American academic and author. She specialized in the study of Midwestern literature and African American literature.

== Life and career ==
Williams was born in Omaha, Nebraska and grew up in Chicago. Her father was Joseph Harrison Jackson, president of the National Baptist Convention from 1953 to 1982.

Williams received a B.A. (1949) from Benedict College and an M.A. (1950) from DePaul University, both in English. She received a second M.A. (1959) and a PhD (1961) from the University of Pennsylvania, both in American Civilization. Williams then taught at Tennessee Agricultural & Industrial State College (1960–64) and Northeastern Illinois University (1964–77). She also served as director of the Joseph H. Jackson Library.

Beginning in 1977, Williams was a professor in Duke University's English department. She was the university's first black professor of English. Williams' areas of specialization included Chicago literature, Sherwood Anderson, and early African American authors such as Phillis Wheatley, Harriet Jacobs, and Paul Laurence Dunbar.

In 1986, Williams received the MidAmerica Award from the Society for the Study of Midwestern Literature for distinguished contributions to the field. She was a member of the executive board of the American Literature Association. Williams and James David Barber were founding members of the Duke chapter of the National Association of Scholars, established in 1990.

In 1991, Williams was appointed to the National Council on the Humanities by Lynne Cheney under President George H. W. Bush, replacing the failed nomination of Carol Iannone. A New York Times editorial was supportive of Williams' appointment, calling her work "solid and interestingly offbeat".

Williams died in 2003; she had previously been diagnosed with cancer. At the time of her death, she was working on a compendium of Civil War-era literature for the Dictionary of Literary Biography series.

== Views ==
Williams was an opponent of affirmative action. In 1990, she spoke out against Duke's proposal to hire one black faculty member per department, saying that these faculty would suffer from the "stigma" that they "weren't really qualified." Williams also opposed efforts to add multiculturalism to the literary canon, which she called a "cult of relevance." In a Wall Street Journal interview, she said: "With all due respect to Alice Walker... I want to teach literature that has stood the test of time." In another interview, Williams said that some of her colleagues seemed uncomfortable with her choice to study Sherwood Anderson, explaining: "Anderson was a white man, and black female academics are supposed to stick to black affairs."

Williams was known for her exacting spelling and grammar standards for students, assigning low grades for poor writing.

== Bibliography ==
=== As author ===
- Williams, Kenny J. (1970). They Also Spoke: An Essay on Negro Literature in America, 1787-1930. Townsend Press. ISBN 9780935990041.
- Williams, Kenny J. (1980). Prairie Voices: A Literary History of Chicago from the Frontier to 1893. Townsend Press. ISBN 9780935990003.
- Williams, Kenny J.; Duffey, Bernard I., eds. (1983). Chicago's Public Wits: A Chapter in the American Comic Spirit. Louisiana State University Press. ISBN 9780807110430.
- Williams, Kenny J. (1988). A Storyteller and a City: Sherwood Anderson's Chicago. Northern Illinois University Press. ISBN 9780875801353.

=== Other ===
- Kenny J. Williams (1988). Introduction. Essays: Including Biographies and Miscellaneous Pieces, in Prose and Poetry. By Plato, Ann. Oxford University Press. ISBN 9780195052473.
