= Stewart Cleveland Cureton =

American minister and activist (1930–2008)

Stewart Cleveland Cureton (March 24, 1930 – December 30, 2008), also known as S. C. Cureton, was an American clergyman and civil rights activist.

== Early life ==
He was born to Santee Argo Cureton and Martha Arrye Henderson Cureton. He is the sixth child of seven. He was educated in the Greenville County school system, graduating from Sterling High School in 1949. Having already accepted God's call to preach at the age of seventeen, he continued his education at Benedict College, Columbia, South Carolina, earning a Bachelor of Arts degree in 1953.

== Ministerial life in South Carolina ==
Cureton modeled his belief that an effective leader needs both a "baptized heart and a baptized brain", and through the years continued his education by studying at numerous other colleges and universities throughout North Carolina and South Carolina. He was awarded the Doctor of Divinity degree from Morris College, Sumter, South Carolina and Benedict College, Columbia, South Carolina. He began his pastorate in 1953 as pastor of Old Pilgrim Baptist Church, Greenville, South Carolina: New Galilee Baptist Church, Walhala, South Carolina; Rock Hill Baptist Church #2, Greenville, South Carolina; Griffin Ebenezer Baptist Church, Pickens, South Carolina and Gethsemane Baptist Church, Chester, South Carolina. In 1965 he was called to pastor Reedy Fork Baptist Church and Reedy River Baptist Church which was his home church. In 1978 he became the full-time pastor of Reedy River Baptist Church. Under his leadership the membership and influence of Reedy River Baptist Church grew exponentially. He led the membership to build two new sanctuaries and a family life center that became the model for many other churches in the Greenville area. Cureton was committed to education, understanding that it is only through education that people can reach their full potential.

== National leadership in ministry ==
Cureton rose from humble beginnings to become a local, state and national leader. Among his many accomplishments: served as moderator of the Reedy River Baptist Association; served as president of the Baptist Educational & Missionary Convention of South Carolina (1986–1991); served as second vice president, vice president-at-large and president of the National Baptist Convention, USA, Inc; appointed as a commission member of the United States Presidential Scholars Program by President Bill Clinton (1991–2000); awarded the Order of the Palmetto Award; served as member of the Benedict College Board of Trustees; served as member of the Morris College Board of Trustees. He was president of the National Baptist Convention from March 1999 to September 1999. Cureton, then vice president-at-large, took over the leadership of the convention when his predecessor Henry Lyons was forced to resign. He served the remainder of Lyons' tenure.

== Teaching career ==
Cureton, a former math teacher at Sterling High School and Beck Middle School, was pastor of Reedy River Missionary Baptist Church in South Carolina at the time of his death. He was an advocate on state issues such as the establishment of a holiday honoring Martin Luther King Jr. in Greenville County. Cureton was instrumental in bringing King to Greenville for a speech in April 1967. Cureton was out front in integrating the public libraries in Greenville County, South Carolina.

== Personal life ==
On December 27, 1954, Cureton married the love of his life, Claudette Hazel Chapman Cureton. From their union four children were born: Ruthye, Stewart Jr., Santee Charles, and Samuel. Samuel followed his father into the ministry. He died on December 30, 2008, aged 78.
