= List of conventions affiliated with the National Baptist Convention, USA =

The following Baptist State or Territory Conventions have registered voluntarily with the National Baptist Convention, USA. The State Conventions are autonomous organizations and separately incorporated. Each State Convention is supported by the voluntary membership of individuals, churches and district associations in the state.

== Mid-West Region Conference ==
=== Illinois ===
- Baptist General State Convention of Illinois, Inc.
- United Baptist State Convention of Illinois, Inc.

=== Indiana ===
- General Missionary Baptist State Convention of Indiana, Inc.
- The Original General Missionary Baptist State Convention of Indiana, Inc.

=== Iowa ===
- Iowa Missionary & Education Baptist State Convention

=== Michigan ===
- Wolverine Baptist State Convention, Inc.
- Baptist Missionary & Education State Convention

=== Minnesota ===
- Minnesota Baptist State Convention

=== Missouri ===
- Missionary Baptist State Convention of Missouri

=== Ohio ===
Ohio Baptist State Convention, Inc.

Ohio Baptist General Convention and Auxiliaries, Inc.

United Missionary Baptist State Convention of Ohio

=== West Virginia ===
- West Virginia Baptist State Convention
- Mountain Baptist State Convention of West Virginia, Inc.

=== Wisconsin ===
- Wisconsin General Baptist State Convention, Inc.
- General Baptist State Convention of Wisconsin, Inc.

== Northeast Region Conference ==
=== Connecticut ===
- Connecticut State Missionary Baptist Convention

=== Delaware ===
- United Baptist Convention of Delaware

=== District Of Columbia ===
- National Capital Baptist Convention
- Baptist Convention of the District of Columbia and Vicinity

=== Maryland ===
- National Capital Baptist Convention
- United Baptist Missionary Convention

=== New Jersey ===
- General Baptist Convention of New Jersey

=== New Hampshire ===
- United Baptist Convention MA/RI/NH

=== New York ===
- Empire Baptist Missionary Convention of New York

=== Massachusetts ===
- United Baptist Convention MA/RI/NH

=== Pennsylvania ===
- The Pennsylvania Baptist State Convention, Inc.

=== Rhode Island ===
- United Baptist Convention MA/RI/NH

== Southeast Region Conference ==
=== Florida ===
- Florida General Baptist Convention, Inc.
- General Baptist State Convention of Florida, Inc.

=== Georgia ===
- The General Missionary Baptist Convention of Georgia
- Fellowship Missionary Baptist Convention of Georgia

=== North Carolina ===
- General Baptist State Convention of North Carolina

=== South Carolina ===
- The Baptist Education & Missionary Convention of South Carolina

=== Virginia ===
- Baptist General Convention of Virginia
- Virginia State Baptist Convention

== Southwest Region Conference ==
=== Alabama ===
- The Alabama State Missionary Baptist Convention, Inc.
- New Era Baptist Convention of Alabama

=== Arkansas ===
- Consolidated Missionary Baptist State Convention of Arkansas, Inc.
- Regular Arkansas Baptist Convention

=== Kentucky ===
- Bluegrass State Baptist Convention
- Kentucky Baptist Missionary & Education Convention

=== Louisiana ===
- Greater Louisiana Baptist Convention, Inc.
- Louisiana Missionary Baptist State Convention

=== Mississippi ===
- East Mississippi State Baptist Convention
- General Missionary Baptist State Convention of Mississippi, Inc.
- Mid-South Churches Cooperative Conference (Baptist) State Convention
- Mississippi General Missionary Baptist State Convention
- New Educational State Convention of Mississippi
- North Mississippi Baptist Education Convention
- Northeast Mississippi Baptist State Convention

=== Tennessee ===
- North Mississippi Baptist Education Convention
- Tennessee Regular Baptist Missionary & Educational State Convention
- Tennessee Baptist Missionary & Educational Convention, Inc.

=== Texas ===
- Baptist Missionary and Education Convention of Texas
- Texas Educational Baptist State Convention
- Texas State Missionary Baptist Convention, Inc.

== Western Region Conference ==
=== Alaska ===
- American/National Baptist Churches of Alaska.

=== Arizona ===
- Paradise Missionary Baptist State Convention of Arizona, Inc.

=== California ===
- Western Baptist State Convention
- California State Baptist Convention, Inc.
- Nevada-California Interstate Baptist Convention
- California Bible Convention

=== Colorado ===
- Colorado/Wyoming Baptist State Convention
- Western State Baptist Convention

=== Idaho ===
- Inter Mountain General Baptist Convention

=== Kansas ===
- Missionary Baptist State Convention of Kansas

=== Nebraska ===
- New Era Baptist State Convention of Nebraska, Inc.

=== New Mexico ===
- Mount Olive Missionary Baptist State Convention of New Mexico

=== Nevada ===
- Nevada-California Interstate Baptist Convention

=== Oklahoma ===
- Oklahoma Baptist State Convention
- Oklahoma Missionary Baptist State Convention

=== Utah ===
- Inter Mountain General Baptist Convention

=== Washington ===
- North Pacific Baptist State Convention

=== Wyoming ===
- Colorado/Wyoming Baptist State Convention
