= Rudyard, Mississippi =

- Unincorporated community
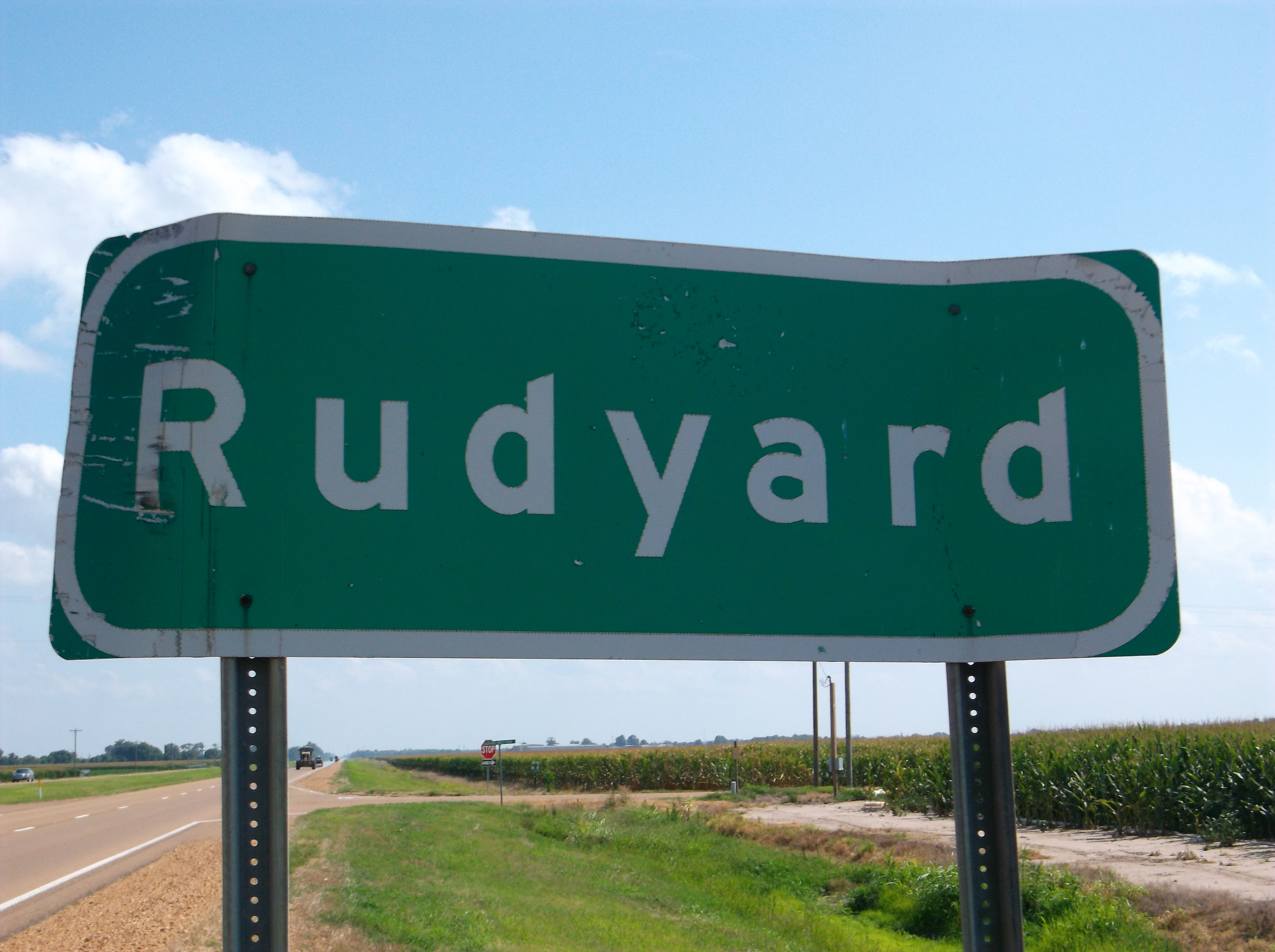
- Highway sign just outside of Rudyard on US Highway 61

- Location within Mississippi Location within the United States
- Coordinates: 34°20′06″N 90°32′12″W
- Country: United States
- State: Mississippi
- County: Coahoma
- Elevation: 164 ft (50 m)
- Time zone: UTC-6 (Central (CST))
  - Summer (DST): UTC-5 (CDT)
- Area code: 662
- GNIS feature ID: 692192

Rudyard is an unincorporated community located near U.S. Route 61 in Coahoma County, Mississippi, United States. Rudyard is 10 miles north of Clarksdale and two miles south of Coahoma along Old Highway 61 and is located on the former Yazoo and Mississippi Valley Railroad. A post office operated under the name Hillhouse from 1899 to 1956.

== Notable person ==
Joseph H. Jackson, a pastor and the longest serving president of the National Baptist Convention, was born in Rudyard.
