= National Action Network =

American civil rights organization

- Formation: 1991
- Founder: Al Sharpton
- Type: Civil rights organization
- Legal status: Non-profit
- Purpose: Civil rights advocacy, social justice, voter protection, criminal justice reform
- Headquarters: Harlem, New York City, United States
- Region served: United States
- President: Al Sharpton
- Website: nationalactionnetwork.net

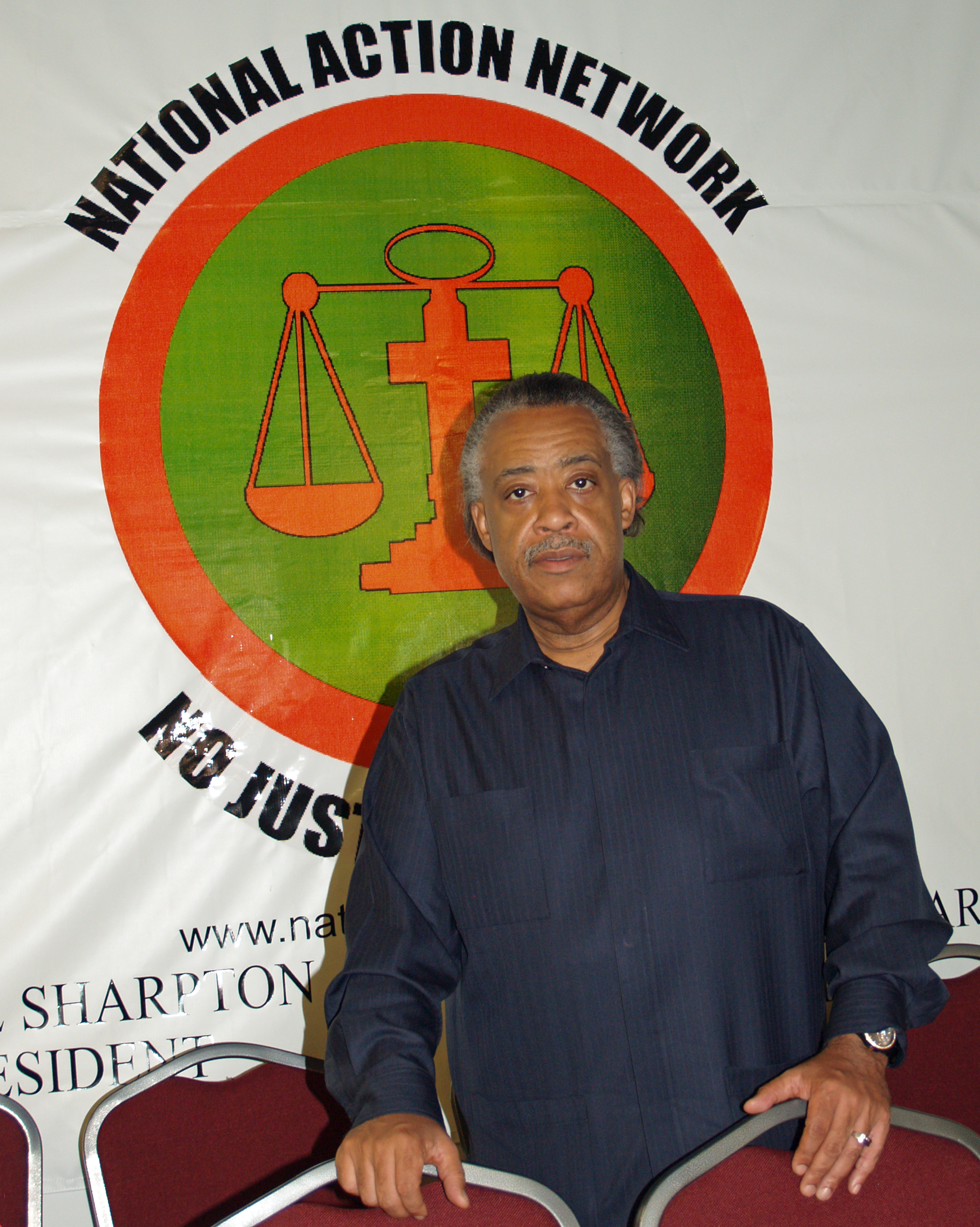
Al Sharpton at National Action Network's headquarters in 2007

The National Action Network (NAN) is an American not-for-profit, civil-rights organization founded by Al Sharpton in New York City in early 1991. In a 2016 profile, Vanity Fair called Sharpton "arguably the country's most influential civil rights leader".

== Organization ==
The organization's board of directors is chaired by Rev. Dr. W. Franklyn Richardson, pastor of Grace Baptist Church in Mount Vernon, New York. The board has historically included individuals associated with the civil rights movement of the 1960s. It was first chaired by Dr. Wyatt Tee Walker, Pastor Emeritus of Canaan Baptist Church in Harlem, New York, and former Executive Director to Dr. Martin Luther King Jr. Coretta Scott King, widow of Dr. King, was a supporter of the organization. Martin Luther King III has participated annually in the organization's annual Keepers of the Dream Awards Dinner and National Convention.

National Action Network's Annual Convention draws more than 8,000 delegates and leaders from media, business, politics, entertainment and the civil rights from across the country. The 2007 convention featured six presidential candidates and was dubbed by the media the "Sharpton Primary". In Barack Obama's speech during the 2007 convention, he said that Rev. Al Sharpton was the "voice of the voiceless and a champion for the downtrodden." In 2011 President Barack Obama delivered a keynote address at their convention, applauding NAN's activism by saying: "National Action Network is not the National 'Satisfaction' Network; it's the National 'Action' Network". At the National Action Network's convention in April 2014 close to 7,000 people attended, making it the biggest in the history of the organization and the largest civil rights convening of the year in the nation. Ar the 2014 convention, President Barack Obama returned to address over 1,200 convention attendees, where he addressed voting and said, "We've got to create a national network committed to taking action. We can call it the National Action Network."

Democratic presidential candidates Hillary Clinton and Bernie Sanders spoke at the Silver Anniversary 2016 National Action Network Convention. "You stand up and always have against gun violence, advocate for criminal justice reform, help young people find jobs, hold corporations accountable, and in a million ways, lift up voices that often go unheard," Clinton said during her speech.

The National Action Network is headquartered in Harlem, New York and has regional offices in Washington, D.C.., Atlanta and Los Angeles. It currently has over 105 chapters in cities around the nation.

In July 2024, civil rights attorney Michael Hardy, one of the National Action Network's most prominent founding members, died. Hardy, who also served as Sharpton's defense lawyer in the defamation case which was brought against Sharption for accusations he made about a Tawana Brawley prosecutor, was credited as the main legal architect for the National Action Network's legal cases and played a prominent in the organization's evolution. Since 1991, Hardy has served as the organization's executive vice president, and also became its general counsel in 2008.

== Issues of focus ==
The National Action Network is widely credited with drawing national attention to critical issues such as racial profiling, police brutality, and the US Naval bombing exercises on the island of Vieques, Puerto Rico. Notably, the organization was prominently involved with the police brutality cases of Amadou Diallo, Abner Louima, Patrick Dorismond (New York) Eric Garner (all in New York), and Michael Brown (Ferguson, Missouri).

I tell young people all the time—and most of the National Action Network leadership in our chapters are younger than me—you have to make a choice at some point in your life: are you going to do something about what angers you, or do you want to just be angry? Because I learned a long time ago that those in power don't care that you're angry, they care if you use that anger to do something about it.

— Al Sharpton

In 1999, the organization launched The Madison Avenue Initiative (MAI), a program designed to address the inequities in the advertising industry. MAI was created after a racially charged memorandum, infamously dubbed, "The Katz Memo", was circulated among certain radio stations, stating that advertisers wanted "prospects, not suspects". The recognition of this memorandum set off an investigation into the spending practices of corporations, specifically examining whether their advertising budgets with African-American and Latino publications and advertising agencies were commensurate with their consumer bases.

In 2000, the organization launched the Truth Hamer Voter Registration and Education Initiative. The Truth Hamer Initiative set out to register one million women to vote, targeting populations in traditionally overlooked areas, such as public housing developments, transitional housing communities and rural areas.

Sharpton's organization has been heavily courted for endorsement by presidential candidates, including both Hillary Clinton and Barack Obama.

=== Walgreens ===
In 2011, Walgreens announced they would be ending their relationship with Express Scripts, a prescription drug program serving mostly poor individuals that gave them discounted prescriptions. This would have resulted in low-income individuals paying up to 30 percent more for their prescriptions. A coalition of minority groups, led by Reverend Al Sharpton's National Action Network, sent letters urging Gregory Wasson, CEO of Walgreens, to reconsider. Groups sending letters were National Hispanic Christian Leadership Conference, the Congress of Racial Equality, Hispanic Leadership Fund, and others.

=== Comcast NBCUniversal MOU ===
In 2011 National Action Network, joined forces with the National Urban League and NAACP to negotiate an agreement between three of the leading civil rights organizations and Comcast NBCUniversal. As part of their filings with the Federal Communications Commission (FCC), Comcast NBC Universal agreed to a written African American Memorandum of Understanding to provide four television stations owned and operated by African Americans (two of which were designated to Magic Johnson and Sean "Diddy" Combs). The MOU was a comprehensive commitment covering all business units and focusing on the following five areas: corporate governance, employment/workforce recruitment and retention, procurement, programming and philanthropy and community investment.

=== Trayvon Martin ===
On February 26, 2012 seventeen-year-old Trayvon Martin was killed by neighborhood watch captain George Zimmerman, who said that he had acted in self-defense. A month later National Action Network and other civil rights organizations came to Sanford, FL for a series of protests and marches to call for Zimmerman's arrest. Six weeks after the shooting, Zimmerman was arrested. On July 13, 2013 George Zimmerman was found not guilty of second-degree murder. He was also acquitted of manslaughter, a lesser charge. On July 20, 2013 National Action Network organized rallies in 100 cities around the country to speak out against the Zimmerman verdict and stand-your-ground-laws.

On March 10, 2014 the National Action Network led a march to Florida's state capitol to rally against stand-your-ground laws. Among those present were the family of Trayvon Martin, Jordan Davis, and Oscar Grant. The family of Marissa Alexander, who was sentenced to 20 years for firing a gun at her estranged husband and the family of Michael Giles, a U.S. Airman sentenced to 25 years in a self-defense case also joined.

=== Stop and frisk ===
On June 17, 2012 National Action Network joined the NAACP and SEIU and 115 other organizations in a march down Fifth Avenue in Manhattan, NY to call for an end to Stop-and-frisk. This New York Police Department policy, National Action Network had been opposed to and spoke out against for years due to its bias towards individuals of color and the databases created by people stopped by Stop-and-frisk. The NYPD released data that nearly 90 percent of those targeted by stop-and-frisks in the city in 2011 were either black or Hispanic. Blacks and Hispanics together make up less than 53 percent of the city's population. A total of 685,724 people — 8.6 percent of the city's population — were detained by cops for "reasonable suspicion." Out of the total of the stop-and-frisk stops 605,328 were totally innocent (88 percent).

In January 2014 the City of New York under the leadership of Mayor Bill de Blasio reached an agreement which resulted in the withdrawal of the City's appeal of the landmark stop-and-frisk case, Floyd v. City of New York.

=== Shop and frisk ===
On October 29, 2013 National Action Network along with other civil rights groups formed a shop-and-frisk task force and convened their first meeting with Barneys CEO Mark Lee. The meeting was brought about when a young African American man claimed that after making a purchase of a designer belt at Barneys, after leaving the store he was confronted by undercover New York Police Department officers, who said a Barneys employee raised concerns over the sale. In court documents, Christian says he showed officers his receipt, debit card and identification but was told "he could not afford to make such an expensive purchase" before being placed in a cell for more than two hours. Ultimately, no charges were filed. At this initial meeting Barneys CEO Mark Lee promised a thorough review of Barneys' practices and procedures to ensure they reflect the company's "continued commitment to fairness and equality." Following this meeting the task force met with Macy's Inc Chairman Terry Lundgren to address similar concerns. One of the outcomes from these meetings was the creation of a 'Customers' Bill of Rights' that was then posted in 2013 during the holiday shopping season. Among those rights outlined in the document is a requirement for store security personnel — some of whom roam the aisles in plainclothes — to identify themselves when interacting with customers. Prohibited is "the use of excessive force" or "threatening, vulgar language" when detaining people suspected of theft. People suspected of engaging in a crime can be detained "only in a reasonable manner and not for more than a reasonable time."

=== March on Washington 50th anniversary ===
National Action Network organized the "national action to realize the dream" march in honor of the 50th anniversary of the March on Washington, on August 24, 2013. The march was led by Rev. Al Sharpton and Martin Luther King III, with US Attorney General Eric Holder, Congressman John Lewis, House Democratic leader Nancy Pelosi, Democratic Whip Steny Hoyer, the families of Trayvon Martin and Emmett Till, and many more. National Action Network brought 1,000 buses carrying activists and marchers.

=== Ministers March for Justice ===
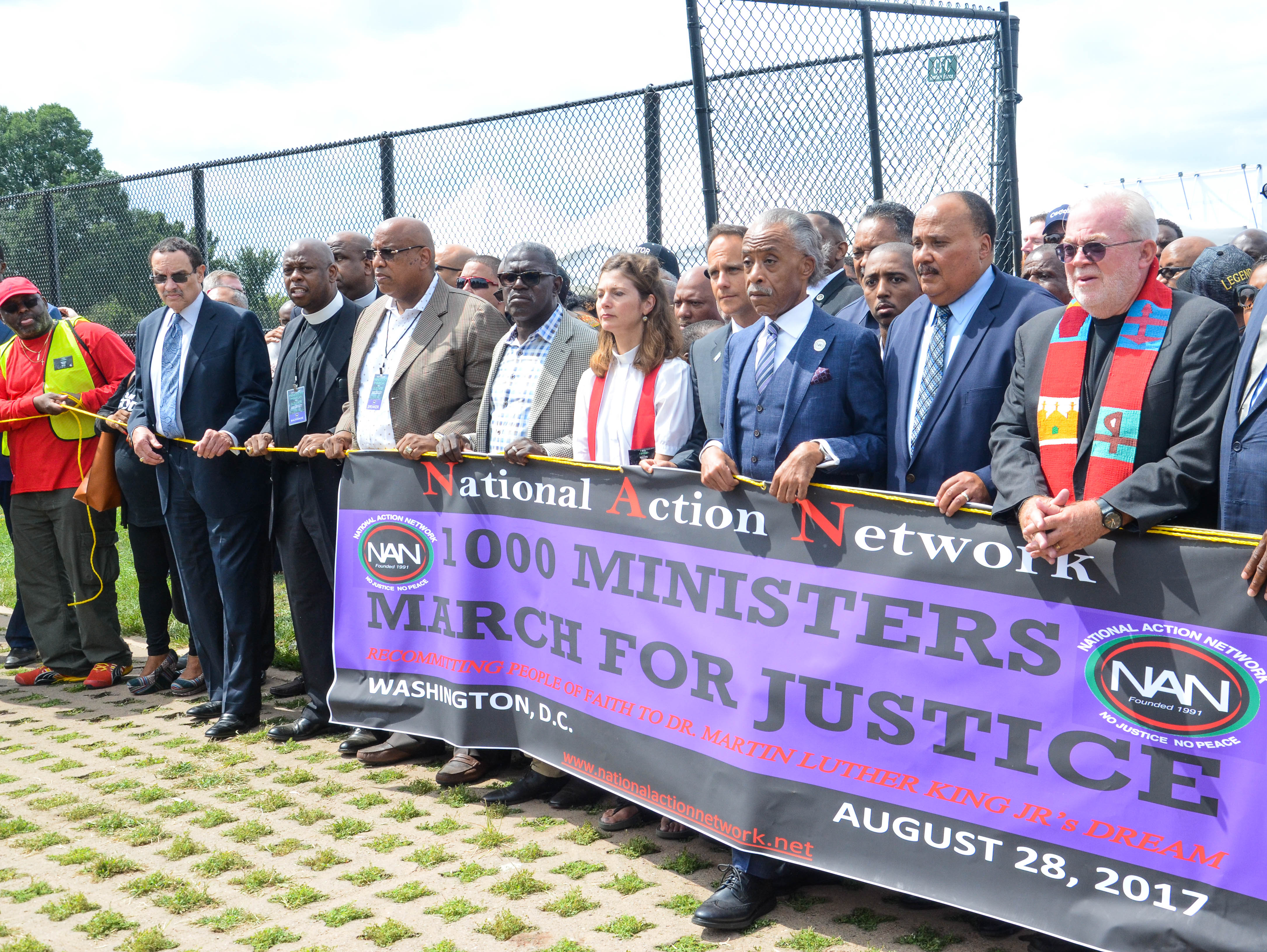
The Ministers March for Justice

On August 28, 2017, the National Action Network organized the Ministers March for Justice. The event, which focused on fighting racism, was attended by thousands of Christian, Jewish, Muslim, and Sikh ministers. The march also criticized President Donald Trump's response to the Unite the Right rally, in which one person was killed by a vehicle attack.

== Tax and salary controversies ==
The United States and the New York State governments have investigated the organization for tax payment irregularities. As late as 2006, the National Action Network owed $1.9 million in payroll taxes and penalties.

Many donors to the National Action Network were subpoenaed in connection with a 2008 tax probe, including Anheuser-Busch.

Sharpton's rate of pay remained around the same until 2014, when he was given a 71% raise to $412,644, which included a bonus of $64,400. The organization's explanation for the increase was that it represented repayment of loans previously made by Sharpton to the National Action Network. The organization's 2018 IRS Form 990 listed Sharpton's compensation at about $1.05 million.

== Controversial donations ==
Sharpton has engaged in controversial donation policies — specifically the practice of threatening protests and boycotts of corporations while simultaneously soliciting donations and sponsorships from them. According to the New York Post, several major corporations, including Anheuser-Busch and Colgate-Palmolive, have donated thousands of dollars to the National Action Network. The Post asserted that the donations were made to prevent boycotts or rallies by the National Action Network.

== Grace Church Websites ==
In 2016, an associate of Rev. Sharpton and a member of his NAN national board, Rev. Dr. Boise Kimber, along with businessman and philanthropist Don Vaccaro, launched Grace Church Websites, a non-profit organization that helps churches create and launch their own websites.
