= Progressive National Baptist Convention =

American Christian denomination (1961-)

- Abbreviation: PNBC
- Classification: Protestant
- Theology: Progressive Baptist
- Polity: Congregational
- President: David Peoples
- Associations: National Council of Churches; Baptist World Alliance
- Founder: L. Venchael Booth
- Origin: 1961; Cincinnati, Ohio
- Separated from: National Baptist Convention
- Congregations: 1,362 (Self-reported, including international churches; 2022); 363 (ARDA; 2020)
- Members: 1,500,000 (Self-reported, including international members; 2022); 254,571 (ARDA; 2020)
- Missionary organization: PNBC Missions
- Official website: www.pnbc.org

The Progressive National Baptist Convention (PNBC), incorporated as the Progressive National Baptist Convention, Inc., is a progressive Baptist Christian denomination emphasizing civil rights and social justice. The headquarters of the Progressive National Baptist Convention are in Washington, D.C. Part of the Black church tradition, since its organization, the denomination has member churches outside the United States, particularly in the Caribbean and Europe. It is a member of the National Council of Churches and the Baptist World Alliance.

== History ==
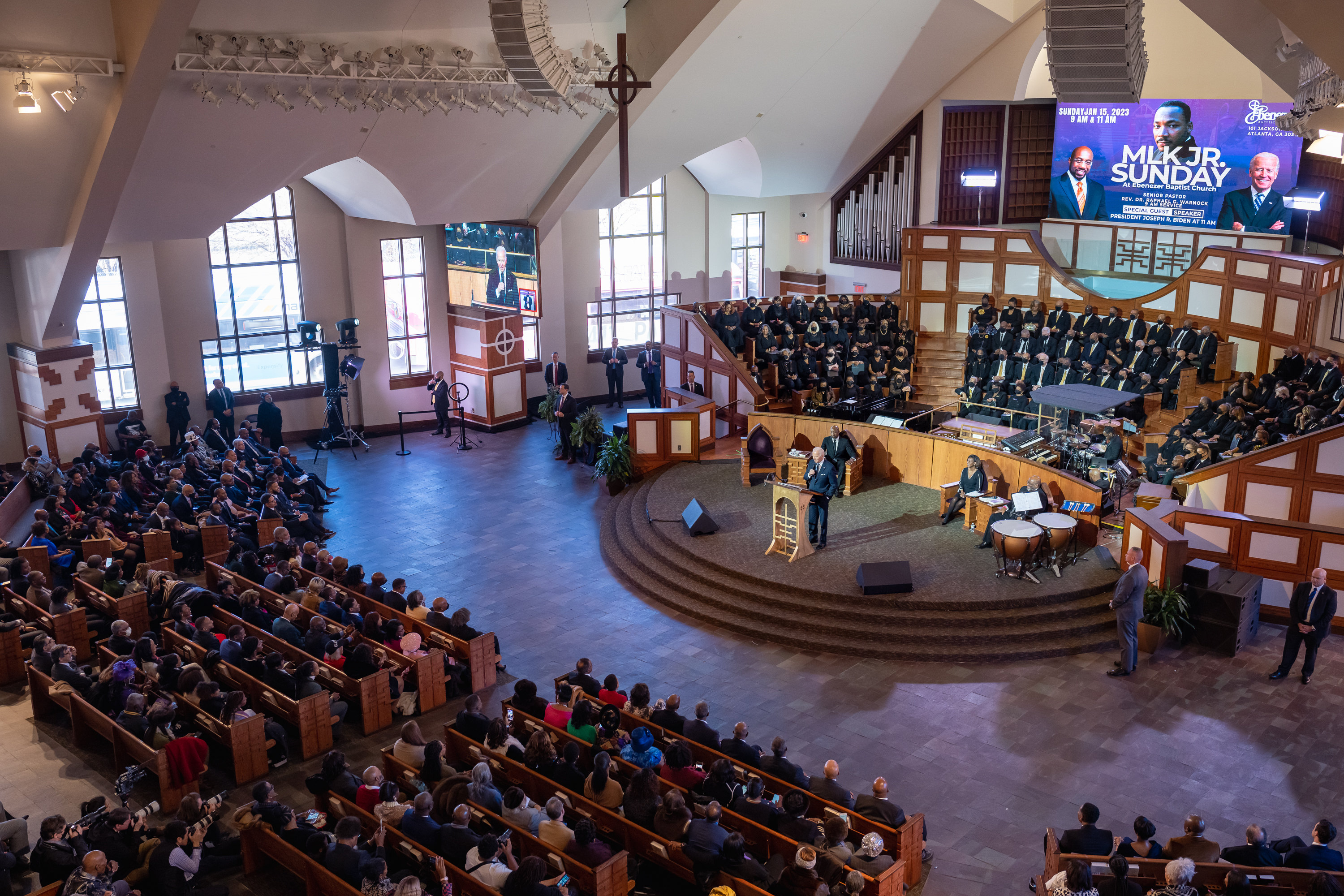
Service at Ebenezer Baptist Church in Atlanta, affiliated with the convention.

The Progressive National Baptist Convention formed in 1961 after civil-rights-oriented Baptist ministers led by L. Venchael Booth of Zion Baptist Church in Cincinnati, failed to replace Joseph H. Jackson, the long-time head of the National Baptist Convention (NBC USA). The older group stood aloof from the civil rights movement which was often led by local Baptist ministers; the National Baptist Convention (NBC USA) often preached spiritual salvation rather than political activism. The dissidents nominated Gardner C. Taylor as president of the NBC USA.

After a fist fight between reformers and conservatives, in which one elderly minister was accidentally killed, Jackson's supporters won. Martin Luther King was ousted from the NBC USA and his goal of using the united power of the black Baptist community to promote civil rights came to nothing. His defeat prompted the formation of the new predominantly African American Baptist denomination.

Thirty-three delegates from 14 states gathered at Zion Baptist Church in Cincinnati to discuss the issue. The vote to organize passed by one vote. L. Venchael Booth, pastor of Zion Baptist in Cincinnati, was elected first president of the convention. The convention was originally formed as the "Progressive Baptist Convention" and the word "National" was added to the name in 1962. The convention has grown from the original founding numbers to member congregations throughout the United States, the Caribbean, Europe and Africa.

Following a path of political activism, the Progressive National Baptist Convention supported groups such as the National Association for the Advancement of Colored People (NAACP) and methods such as affirmative action. Famous civil rights leaders who were members of the PNBC include Martin Luther King Jr., Benjamin Mays, Ralph Abernathy, Wyatt Tee Walker, and Gardner C. Taylor. The Progressive National Baptist Convention bills the "progressive concept" as "fellowship, progress, and peace."

In 1969, Uvee Mdodana Arbouin became the first ordained woman pastor in the convention.

In the early 2000s, the Progressive National Baptists united with the National Baptist Convention, National Baptist Convention of America, and National Missionary Baptist Convention as the Joint National Baptist Convention; in 2024, the PNBC cooperated with the four conventions again in order to establish a joint agenda for African American Baptists.

The Progressive National Baptist Convention celebrated its 50th Annual Session in Washington, D.C., in August 2011. The PBNC has partnered with the predominantly white mainline American Baptist Churches USA since 1970.

In 2022, the Progressive National Baptist Convention elected Jacqueline A. Thompson as second vice president, which made her the first woman to hold an elected leadership role in the Progressive National Baptist Convention.

On January 22, 2024, before the Joint National Baptist Convention, the PNBC called for a ceasefire in Gaza.

== Statistics ==
According to the Association of Religion Data Archives, in 1963, the PNBC had 500,000 members in 394 churches before growing to 2.5 million members in 1991 spread throughout 1,400 churches. Since then, the convention's U.S.-based membership has stagnated, similar to the National Baptist Convention of America at the time. By 2009, the same organization numbered the PNBC as having 1,010,000 members in 1,500 churches. In 2020, the Association of Religion Data Archives reported the PNBC had 254,571 members in 363 churches in the United States. According to a census published by the Baptist World Alliance in 2022, however, it self-reported 1,500,000 members in 1,362 churches altogether. In another study by the World Council of Churches, its global membership was approximately 2,500,000.

== Beliefs ==
In the Progressive National Baptist Convention, many members and affiliates identify with Progressive Baptist theology—being theologically moderate to liberal; this contrasts with the theologically conservative to moderate National Baptist Convention, National Baptist Convention of America, and National Missionary Baptist Convention. The Progressive National Baptist Convention collectively also recognizes the ordination of women. Contrasting, its predecessor—the NBC USA—has no official position on women's ordination, though women do serve as pastors in the convention and in other leadership capacities. According to the PNBC, it creates "opportunities for women in ministry to learn and serve."

=== Marriage ===
It leaves it up to local churches to decide on blessings of same-sex marriage.

== See also ==
- Christianity in the United States
