= Sarah Willie Layton =

Suffragist

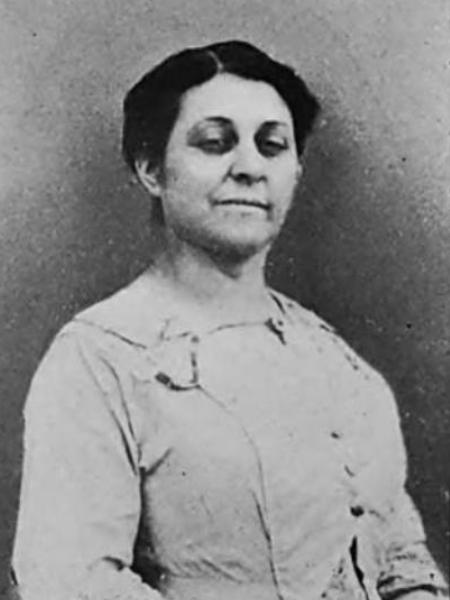
- Sarah Willie Layton, from a 1915 publication
- Born: Sarah Willie Phillips; 1864; Grenada, Mississippi
- Died: January 14, 1950 (aged 85–86); Philadelphia, Pennsylvania
- Education: LeMoyne College
- Occupations: Suffragist, Activist

Sarah Willie Layton (1864 – January 14, 1950) was a suffragist and civil rights activist.

== Biography ==
Layton née Phillips was born in 1864 in Grenada, Mississippi. She was the daughter of Baptist minister William H. Phillips and his wife Mary. The African American National Biography states that it is likely that both William and Mary were born into slavery, and possibly Sarah was as well.

Layton graduated from LeMoyne College in 1881. In 1882 she married I. H. Layton with whom she had one child. The couple settled in Los Angeles, California. In Los Angeles Layton became involved with the "Western Baptist Association of California" and the "California Federation of Colored Women's Clubs". She also served as the California editor of the national newspaper, The Woman's Era.

In 1894 Layton moved to Philadelphia, Pennsylvania following the death of her husband. There she became active in the "National Baptist Convention" (NBC) where she organized the "Baptist Women's Convention" (BWC) in 1890 and served as its first president. She advocated for women's rights within the male dominated NBC. Around 1910, under Layton's leadership, the BWC became an advocate for women's suffrage.

Layton's BWC activism went on to include collaborations and memberships with the "Church Women's Committee on Race Relation (CWCRR)", the "National League for the Protection of Colored Women" (NLPCW) which subsequent merged with the "National Urban League', the Progressive Party, the Republican Party, and the National Woman's Party. Layton became the first woman and first African-American woman field secretary of the National Urban League. She retired from the BWC in 1948.

Layton died on January 14, 1950, in Philadelphia.

== Legacy ==
In 1984 The "S. Willie Layton Hospital" was built in Chilembwe, Malawi.
