= Carol Iannone =

American writer and literary critic

Carol Iannone was a conservative writer and literary critic. She first made her mark as a strong critic of feminism in articles such as "The Barbarism of Feminist Scholarship." She has published extensively in Commentary, National Review, First Things, Modern Age, The American Conservative, Academic Questions, and other conservative and neoconservative publications. She died in December 2023.

== Career ==
She was the founding Vice President of the National Association of Scholars, and an editor of Academic Questions, the quarterly publication of NAS. She was a regular contributor at the Phi Beta Cons blog at National Review Online.

In 1991 President George H. W. Bush nominated her to be on the board of the National Endowment for the Humanities, which was strongly opposed by officers of the Modern Language Association and other academics; they argued that she was not a distinguished scholar. She had virtually no record of publication in scholarly journals, and had never authored a scholarly book. The campaign against her, backed by many liberal academics and by Sen. Edward Kennedy, succeeded in defeating her nomination, which was replaced by Kenny J. Williams.

Iannone's interests have gone beyond literature. In her article, "Bryan was right", she wrote that Christians are mistaken when they say that God and Darwinian evolution are compatible.

In recent years she wrote increasingly on issues of national identity, criticizing the neoconservative belief that America is an idea rather as a culture. She served on the board of directors of the Center for Immigration Studies.

== Selected works ==
- Iannone, Carol (Fall 1987). "The Barbarism of Feminist Scholarship". The Intercollegiate Review. 23 (1): 35.
- Iannone, Carol (Winter 1993–1994). "Is There a Woman's Perspective in Literature?". Academic Questions.
- Iannone, Carol (February 1997). "The Truth about Inherit the Wind". First Things.
- Iannone, Carol (2013). "Weighty Matters". Academic Questions (Review of Why Trilling Matters by Adam Kirsch). 26 (2): 220–228. doi:10.1007/s12129-013-9357-4.
