= Boise Kimber =

Baptist minister and civil rights activist

- Born: February 9, 1959
- Occupations: Pastor, activist

Boise Kimber (born February 9, 1959) is an American Baptist minister and civil rights activist. He is the pastor of First Calvary Baptist churches in New Haven and Hartford, Connecticut; he is also the president of the National Baptist Convention USA, Inc..

== Early life and education ==
Boise Kimber was born in 1959 in Phenix City, Alabama to parents Milburn and Ruthie Kimber; he was the middle child of three children. He attended local schools and graduated from Central High School. Raised in the Baptist Church, he began preaching at age 15.

In 1981, Kimber completed his undergraduate studies at Johnson C. Smith University in Charlotte, North Carolina, and in 1997, he earned a Master of Arts Degree in Religious Life from Hartford Seminary in Hartford, Connecticut. In May 2001, he completed his Doctorate Degree in Ministry at United Theological Seminary in Dayton, Ohio. His approved dissertation title was Developing a Social Justice Consciousness in a Local Congregation.

== Political and community life ==
In Connecticut, Kimber has been described as one of the “powerful players within the black community”. Locally, Kimber is president emeritus of the Greater New Haven Clergy Association, a consultant to the office of Multicultural Affairs and the Multicultural Center at Southern Connecticut State University, a Fire Commissioner for the City of New Haven, a Director for Aids Interfaith Network, Inc., an advisor to local labor unions, and a member of Omega Psi Phi fraternity.

In 2001 Kimber participated in a congressional lunch of ministers; participants talked about revitalizing black and urban communities and the role of social institutions such as church and family in meeting that goal.

Kimber formerly served as the chairman of the New Haven Fire Commission, where he was embroiled in controversy after the union head accused him making racist comments. After Kimber stepped down from leadership, long-serving New Haven Mayor John DeStefano, Jr., who appointed Kimber, said he was “pleased that he acknowledged that they were inappropriate and demonstrated real leadership by not letting his leadership as head of the commission become an issue."

In 2012, he hosted Sharpton at a get-out-the-vote rally.

Kimber served as president of the Connecticut Missionary Baptist State Convention, and in 2013 was a candidate for president of the National Baptist Convention, USA, the nation’s oldest and largest African-American religious group. While addressing the Louisiana Missionary Baptist State Convention (LMBSC) in November 2013, Kimber said,

“We must speak for those who cannot speak for themselves, for those who are disenfranchised… we must have a voice… When was the last time you heard this convention talk about anything that was wrong in our world? We said nothing about Trayvon Martin; we said nothing about the (federal government) shutdown. We said nothing about gay and lesbian marriages." Kimber was later endorsed by LMBSC President C.S. Gordon Jr.

In July 2013, Kimber led a coalition of religious and social groups in a "Justice for Trayvon" vigil to press the federal government to investigate civil rights charges against George Zimmerman. Kimber said, "How many more times do we have to rally around justice for our children? How many more courts will free overzealous vigilantes who gun down unarmed American citizens and cry self-defense? Black and Brown American teens should feel confident that the American justice system also works for them; the Zimmerman acquittal tells them otherwise."

After the Sandy Hook Elementary School shooting, Kimber led a prayer service with Al Sharpton for the victims and survivors of the mass shootings. “We come here in solidarity with our brother and sister up the street to let you know your pain is our pain and your hurt is our hurt,” said Kimber. On Sharpton's national television news show later that evening, Kimber added that, "We come tonight to ask that communities all over this country, let`s come together, stand together, and let`s begin to work with Congress, Senate and let`s make sure that our representatives understand what is happening within our communities."

In 2014 Kimber partnered with a local businessman to announce the launch of a $1 million loan program for urban churches. Additionally, he and the same businessman have been conducting job fairs in urban churches throughout Connecticut.

Kimber was recently honored at the National Action Network's national convention for his service to the church and the community. President Barack Obama presented the keynote speech that focused on the importance of protecting voting rights.

In 2025, he was installed as the president of the National Baptist Convention, USA.

== US Supreme Court case Ricci v. DeStefano (2009) ==
As Chairman of the New Haven Fire Commission, in 2004, Kimber lobbied with other members to set aside the results of a firefighter's promotion exam, as no blacks qualified highly enough to have a chance at the available slots. Using the exam results would have promoted whites and a Latino firefighter to the available upper positions. The 20 firefighters who qualified for promotion under this exam filed suit against the city for its action.

In his concurring opinion in Ricci v. DeStefano (2009), Supreme Court Justice Samuel Alito singled out Kimber for having political motivations in his decision to set aside the results. This brought Kimber into the center of the controversy and led to mass media attention. Journalist Emily Bazelon of Slate referred to Kimber as "a convenient example of small-time race baiting and semi-thuggery."

== Philanthropy ==
In 2016 Don Vaccaro and Rev Kimber launched Grace Church Websites, a non-profit that offers local churches and nonprofit groups in the New Haven area a wide variety of free Web-related services, including domain registration, website maintenance, annual domain renewal, content management system, and hosting. Since February 2016, the company has worked with more than 600 churches and nonprofit organizations to launch free websites.
