= Cecelia Adkins =

African-American publisher

Cecelia Nabrit Adkins (September 3, 1923 – January 2, 2007) was an African-American publisher from Atlanta. She was the first woman, and first lay person, elected to the position of executive director of the Sunday School Publishing Board of the National Baptist Convention, USA, Inc. In this position, she was responsible for serving 35,000 churches and over 8 million constituents. She took up the position in 1975.

In 1977 Adkins was the first woman to serve on the Board of Directors of the Nashville Branch of the Federal Reserve Bank of Atlanta, and she served two terms as its chair.

Adkins was the first African-American woman appointed to the Board of Education of Nashville and Davidson County, Tennessee, and she served for six years.

She died in Nashville, Tennessee, aged 83.
