= Gardner C. Taylor =

American preacher

Gardner Calvin Taylor (June 18, 1918 – April 5, 2015) was an American Baptist preacher. He became known as "the dean of American preaching".

== Biography ==
Taylor, who was of African American heritage, was born in 1918 in Baton Rouge, Louisiana, to the Rev. Washington M. and Selina Taylor, and was the grandson of emancipated slaves. He grew up in the segregated South of the early 20th century. He graduated from the Oberlin College School of Theology in 1940.

== Ministry ==
As a student, Taylor became the pastor of Bethany Baptist Church in Elyria, Ohio, a role he held from 1938 to 1941. He then became pastor of the Beulah Baptist Church in New Orleans until 1943, and of his father's former congregation, Mount Zion Baptist Church, in Baton Rouge, until 1947. He then became head of the Concord Baptist Church of Christ, the second largest Baptist congregation in the United States with 8,000 members, located in Bedford-Stuyvesant, a neighborhood in Brooklyn. Under his leadership, the congregation grew to as large as 10,000.

Taylor was a close friend and mentor to Martin Luther King Jr. and played a prominent role in the religious leadership of the Civil Rights Movement of the 1960s. In 1958, Robert F. Wagner Jr., mayor of New York City, named Taylor to the New York City Board of Education, the second black member in its history. In a three-year tenure, he attacked segregation in city schools and argued that federal aid should be denied to private schools while public schools were desperate for funds. In 1961, he helped found the Progressive National Baptist Convention with a group of pastors led by L. Venchael Booth of Concord Baptist Church of Christ in Brooklyn, providing an important base of support for King's civil rights work, and served as its president from 1967 to 1969. At the request of Mayor Wagner in 1962, he served on a three-man committee that replaced Joseph T. Sharkey as chairman of the Kings County Democratic County Committee for ten months, until a replacement was selected.

Taylor was pastor of Concord for 42 years before retiring in 1990. More than 2,000 of his sermons are archived, and recordings of many of them are available in collections such as The Words of Gardner Taylor: 50 Years of Timeless Treasures and at the Interdenominational Theological Center in Atlanta.

Taylor received 15 honorary degrees during his lifetime. He gave lectures and sermons at universities and churches all over the United States, as well as in South Africa, Zambia, Malawi, Denmark, England, Scotland, Australia, China, and Japan. He preached the pre-inauguration sermon in January 1993 for President-elect Bill Clinton at Metropolitan A.M.E. Church in Washington D.C. He received the Presidential Medal of Freedom on August 9, 2000, awarded by President Clinton.

Taylor died on April 5, 2015, after attending Easter services at Mount Vernon Baptist Church in Durham, North Carolina, where he had lived in retirement.

== See also ==
- Fred Luter
- Joseph Willis (minister)
- T. J. Jemison
- William Hicks (pastor)

== Literature ==
- Alcántara, Jared E (2015). Crossover preaching: intercultural-improvisational homiletics in conversation with Gardner C. Taylor. Downers Grove, Illinois: InterVarsity Press. p. 254. ISBN 978-0-8308-3908-7. OCLC 968245133.
- Taylor, Gardner C; George, Timothy; Massey, James Earl; Smith, Robert (2010). Our sufficiency is of God: essays on preaching in honor of Gardner C. Taylor. Macon, Georgia: Mercer University Press. p. 342. ISBN 978-0-88146-206-7. OCLC 879171380.
