= Henry Lyons =

American minister (1942–2025)

Henry J. Lyons (March 5, 1942 – October 27, 2025) was an American Protestant pastor and president of the National Baptist Convention, USA from 1994 to 1999. He was indicted by federal prosecutors in 1998 for fraud, extortion, money laundering, conspiracy, and tax evasion.

== Early life ==
Lyons was raised by his grandfather, a deacon named Booker T. Lyons. His own father, who was only 16 when Henry was born, played a minimal role in his childhood. He attended Gibbs Junior College in St. Petersburg, Florida (1960–62), and studied at Bethune-Cookman College in Daytona Beach (1962–64). He then entered the Interdenominational Theological Center in Atlanta.

In 1970, he moved to Cincinnati. In 1972 he gained a more important position in St. Petersburg, Florida.

He married Deborah Lyons in the 1970s.

In 1977 he became Vice President of the Florida General Baptist Convention, and was then its President from 1981 to 1994. In 1994, Lyons became President of the National Baptist Convention USA Inc.

== Presidency of the National Baptist Convention ==
Always a charismatic speaker, Lyons' tenure featured much activity. He established a Unified Program, reduced the debt on the Baptist World Center, and dissolved the debt on the Sunday School Publishing Board. In addition, many commissions were added to the convention. He pledged to "raise a standard" and overcome the difficulties caused by his predecessor T. J. Jemison's support of Mike Tyson in his rape case. However, in many respects he would exacerbate, rather than diminish, the difficulties of the organization.

== Personal and legal difficulties ==
In February 1998 he was charged with one count of racketeering and two counts of grand theft, and in summer 1998 he was indicted by federal prosecutors for fraud, extortion, money laundering, conspiracy and tax evasion. He initially protested his innocence and claimed there was a racial motivation for the charges, but the proceedings of his trial and his eventual plea bargaining agreement dampened the enthusiasm of those who maintained his innocence. In 1999 Lyons was sentenced to a total of five and a half years in jail for misappropriating more than $4 million from the NBC while he was its President, a post from which he had already resigned. In November 2003, he was released on probation and returned to preaching in St Petersburg. He then became pastor of the New Salem Missionary Baptist Church in Tampa, Florida.

On June 15, 2017, Lyons was forced out of his position by the board of trustees, amid accusations of theft and misconduct.

In April 2007 Lyons was defeated in an attempt to be re-elected President of the Florida General Baptist Convention. Subsequently, he and his supporters organized the General Baptist State Convention of Florida, of which he was the President. In 2009, he was defeated in his bid for presidency of the National Baptist Convention, USA.

== Death ==
Lyons died in Tampa, FL on October 27, 2025, at the age of 83.
