= Baton Rouge bus boycott =

Early action of the American Civil Rights Movement

- Part of the Civil Rights Movement
- Date: June 19 – June 25, 1953
- Location: Baton Rouge, Louisiana, McKinley High School, Memorial Stadium
- Caused by: Racial segregation on public transportation
- Result: Inspires Montgomery bus boycott

Parties
United Defense League (UDL); Baton Rouge City Council; Bus company	Louisiana Attorney General; Bus drivers' union

Lead figures
UDL member: T. J. Jemison	State Atty. General: Fred S. LeBlanc

The Baton Rouge bus boycott was a week-long protest campaign against the policy of racial segregation on the city buses of Baton Rouge, Louisiana. The boycott was launched on June 19, 1953, by African-American residents who comprised 80% of bus riders in Louisiana's capital city, and yet were barred under Jim Crow rules from sitting in the front rows of a municipal bus. Instead, they were forced into the back of the bus, often having to stand, even as numerous seats reserved for whites remained empty.

The boycott ended with a compromise that opened up additional seats on buses for use by black riders, while still preserving a framework of segregation. The Baton Rouge free-ride system—quickly organized by the city's black churches to offer car rides to bus boycotters—was studied later by Martin Luther King Jr. as a model to copy on a larger scale in Montgomery, Alabama. Although overshadowed by the more famous Montgomery bus boycott of 1955–56, the action taken in 1953 by the African-American community in Baton Rouge has come to be recognized as a pivotal early event in the civil rights movement.

== History ==
In the decades prior to the boycott, blacks in Baton Rouge were allowed to own and manage private buses to supply transportation for their fellow black residents. In 1950, the Louisiana state legislature passed a law prohibiting citizens from owning private buses that operated independently of the state's municipal systems. As a consequence, all Baton Rouge residents were required to use the segregated public transit. In his book The Origins of the Civil Rights Movement, sociologist Aldon Morris explains the segregation rules that existed on buses in Baton Rouge:

Under the Jim Crow system, every public bus had a "colored section" in the back and a "white section" in the front. If the white section filled up, blacks had to move farther toward the back, carrying with them the sign designating "colored". When blacks filled up the colored section, however, they had to stand even though seats in the white section were vacant. Most of the bus routes passed through the black community, which meant that the colored section was often full and the entire white section empty. In the heart of their own community, blacks had to stand over vacant seats designated for white passengers.

According to the Jim Crow rule in Baton Rouge, the first ten rows of a bus were reserved for whites.

=== Ordinance 222 ===
In the early 1950s, blacks constituted 28% of Baton Rouge's population of 125,000 (per the 1950 census), but made up 80% of the bus ridership. By 1953, discontent with the segregated city buses was reaching a boiling point. In January, bus fares were raised from 10 to 15 cents. In early February, Reverend T.J. Jemison of Mount Zion Baptist Church complained to the City Council about blacks having to stand in the overcrowded rear section while reserved "white" seats were empty.

The council eventually enacted Ordinance 222, which eased segregation rules on buses. Rather than mandating reserved seats, the ordinance stipulated a more flexible, first-come-first-served arrangement in which blacks could occupy seats from the rear forward, while whites would occupy seats from the front to the back (note: other Southern cities had adopted similar seating policies). Under this revised system, a black person could in principle sit in the front provided that (a) the back of the bus was filled, and (b) the black person refrained from sitting next to a white person or in a seat in front of a white person. In addition, black riders had to enter the bus via the rear door rather than the front door. As Dean Sinclair writes:

Though the separation of races would be maintained, black bus riders would at least be able to sit down. Mayor Jesse Webb and the council, with the support and guidance of City Attorney Gordon King, unanimously approved Ordinance 222 on March 11, 1953. It is interesting that approval of the resolution was not noted in the Baton Rouge Morning Advocate, the city's leading newspaper.

In fact, the ordinance was not well-publicized; most residents were unaware of its contents, and the city's all-white bus drivers failed to observe the rule changes.

=== Martha White ===
On the morning of June 15, 1953, a 31-year-old black housekeeper named Martha White (1922–2021) climbed aboard a crowded Baton Rouge bus after having walked miles to the bus stop. She saw only one seat available, in the "reserved" section at the front. She took the off-limits seat. The bus driver told her she could not sit there. She started to get up, but then decided to sit back down. At that point, according to one biographer, the irate bus driver "manhandled" her. Soon, another black woman on the bus sat beside White in solidarity. The driver threatened to have them arrested and called the police. As Martha White later remembered, "It seemed like every police in town was there, and the head of the bus commission". Rev. Jemison showed up as well and he intervened on White's behalf. While he could not keep her from being thrown off the bus, he prevented her from being arrested by citing the provisions of Ordinance 222.

White's act of civil disobedience followed a few similar incidents in the preceding weeks in which Baton Rouge black residents, Rev. Jemison in particular, tested the limits of the new ordinance. In one case, he took a seat near the front of a bus and would not move when the driver instructed him to. The driver grew so frustrated, he drove the bus directly to the police station; however, the officers declined to arrest Jemison because, technically speaking, he was not breaking the law.

During the heated clash on June 15, bus company manager H. D. Cauthen arrived on the scene and told the recalcitrant driver to obey the City Council ordinance. When the driver refused, Cauthen suspended him. The bus drivers' union reacted to the suspension by staging a walkout. Their protest lasted until June 19. On that day, Louisiana Attorney General Fred LeBlanc declared Ordinance 222 "unconstitutional because it did not specifically reserve seats for whites and blacks." The drivers were satisfied and returned to work.

=== Bus boycott ===
In response to the overturning of Ordinance 222, Jemison joined with the city's black businessmen and church leaders to form the United Defense League (UDL). On June 19, the UDL called for a boycott of Baton Rouge buses. The first nightly meeting of boycott participants was held at Jemison's Mount Zion Baptist Church. He and the UDL, which included a coalition of the city's African-American churches, proved effective at rallying the community to back the boycott. By June 22, the outpouring of support was such that the nightly meetings had to be moved to a larger venue at McKinley High School.

The churches quickly organized a makeshift free-ride system that today might be termed a ride-share or carpool program, with parishioners using their personal vehicles to drive other black residents to and from their jobs. To underwrite the program, churches passed collection plates to help cover gasoline and car maintenance expenses. It was estimated that several thousand dollars were raised in a couple of days. One black owner of an Esso station aided the boycott drivers by selling his gas at wholesale prices. The free-ride system, which operated from 5:00 a.m. till midnight, had to be free or it would have been shut down by the city government as an unlicensed taxi service. In a 1994 interview, Jemison recalled that at the height of the boycott, 65 to 70 cars and trucks were giving rides.

The boycott was successful in that almost no blacks rode on a city bus. They either used the free-ride system or walked to work. The Baton Rouge bus company was feeling the pain of the boycott since black passengers represented two-thirds of its normal revenue. The company was losing an estimated $1,600 per day. To resolve the conflict, the City Council passed Ordinance 251 on June 24. It was a compromise measure that retained the first-come-first-served language of Ordinance 222, but also preserved segregation by designating the two front sideway seats as reserved for whites, and the wide rear seat spanning the back of the bus as reserved for blacks.

On June 25, at a McKinley High School meeting attended by 7,000 people in Memorial Stadium, the Ordinance 251 compromise was accepted, albeit grudgingly and under protest by those who wanted to keep the boycott going. At the meeting, the decision was made to halt the free-ride system, which for all practical purposes ended the boycott. Jemison and the other leaders promised to challenge the new ordinance in court. They kept their promise but it took nine years in the Louisiana courts to finally end segregation on Baton Rouge buses. For the remainder of the decade, the achievements of the boycott inspired the city's black residents to continue mobilizing around racial justice issues, such as desegregating eating establishments.

=== Impact on Montgomery ===
Although the compromise did not provide a complete victory for black bus riders, the boycott itself illustrated the power of peaceful resistance to force concessions and, in so doing, influenced the civil rights movement that followed. Rev. Martin Luther King Jr. was keenly aware of what transpired in Baton Rouge. At the start of the Montgomery bus boycott in December 1955, he placed a long-distance call to Rev. Jemison, as Taylor Branch notes:

King gleaned from Jemison every useful detail within memory about how to organize a massive car pool. That very night he took the pulpit at a mass meeting to explain why they had to maintain the [Montgomery] boycott.... The good news, King announced bravely, was that they could organize a car pool similar to the one in Baton Rouge. To do this, car owners must volunteer cars, and drivers must volunteer to drive. No money could change hands directly, but passengers could make contributions to the MIA [Montgomery Improvement Association], and the MIA could in turn subsidize the costs of the car pool.

In addition to copying the private carpool system, Montgomery's boycott strategists also adopted the Baton Rouge practice of holding nightly mass meetings, "which brought everyone together where they discussed what had happened all day and how they planned to continue the next day."

According to historian Douglas Brinkley, "All of the people in Montgomery studied Baton Rouge. It became their case study. What did the people of Baton Rouge do right? What did they do wrong? How can we improve it here in Montgomery? So if you'd like, it's sort of the John the Baptist of the Montgomery bus boycott. I once interviewed Rosa Parks, who told me how important it was, what went on in Baton Rouge. In her NAACP office in Montgomery, they were monitoring what was happening there, daily. So in that sense, it's very, very important because it educated Martin Luther King Jr., Rosa Parks and others on how to do a successful boycott."

== Legacy ==
As historians and scholars have researched the U.S. civil rights movement, the 1953 bus boycott in Baton Rouge has grown in stature. Aldon Morris called it "the starting point", "the first major battle of the modern civil rights movement", and "the first evidence that the system of racial segregation could be challenged by mass action."

In June 2003, the boycott's 50th anniversary was honored in Baton Rouge with three days of events organized by a 30-year old white resident, Marc Sternberg. He was raised in Louisiana's capital city and yet he learned only by accident about the boycott while reading an account of its more celebrated counterpart in Montgomery. He was quoted as saying, "Before Dr. King had a dream, before Rosa kept her seat, and before Montgomery took a stand, Baton Rouge played its part."

In 2004, Louisiana Public Broadcasting aired a documentary film entitled Signpost to Freedom: The 1953 Baton Rouge Bus Boycott that sought, in its words, "to bring this remarkable, untold story to millions of Americans."

In November 2015, the Toni Morrison Society's "Bench by the Road" project selected Baton Rouge as a site to memorialize. The project places benches at locations with historical significance for people of African ancestry. The bench commemorating the Baton Rouge bus boycott was unveiled on February 6, 2016, at the McKinley High School Alumni Center.

At the time of her death in 2021, Martha White was recognized as an unsung heroine of the civil rights movement who, like Claudette Colvin and Rosa Parks would do in 1955 in Montgomery, defied segregation on city buses.
