= National Baptist Convention, USA =

American Christian denomination

- Seal
- Classification: Protestant
- Orientation: Baptist
- Polity: Congregationalist
- President: Boise Kimber
- Associations: Baptist World Alliance; Christian Churches Together
- Founder: Elias Camp Morris
- Origin: 1895; Montgomery, Alabama
- Merger of: Foreign Mission Baptist Convention (org. 1880); American National Baptist Convention (org. 1886); National Baptist Education Convention (org. 1893)
- Separations: Church of God in Christ (separated 1896); Lott Carey Foreign Mission Convention (separated 1897); National Baptist Convention of America, Inc. (separated 1915); Progressive National Baptist Convention (separated 1961); Full Gospel Baptist Church Fellowship (separated 1992)
- Congregations: 21,145 (Self-reported, including international churches; 2023); 2,530 (ARDA; 2020)
- Members: 8,415,100 (Self-reported, including international members; 2023); 1,567,741 (ARDA; 2020)
- Missionary organization: Foreign Mission Board
- Aid organization: Disaster Management
- Tertiary institutions: American Baptist College
- Official website: www.nbcusainc.org

The National Baptist Convention, USA, more commonly known as the National Baptist Convention (NBC USA or NBC), is a Baptist Christian denomination headquartered at the Baptist World Center in Nashville, Tennessee and affiliated with the Baptist World Alliance. It is also one of the largest predominantly and traditionally African American churches in the United States, and was the second largest Baptist denomination in the world in 2016.

== Name ==
The official, full name of the Christian denomination is the National Baptist Convention of the United States America, and it has been incorporated as the National Baptist Convention, USA, Inc. Individuals and organizations affiliated or separate from the denomination commonly refer to it as the National Baptist Convention or National Baptist Convention, USA.

== History ==
=== Origins ===
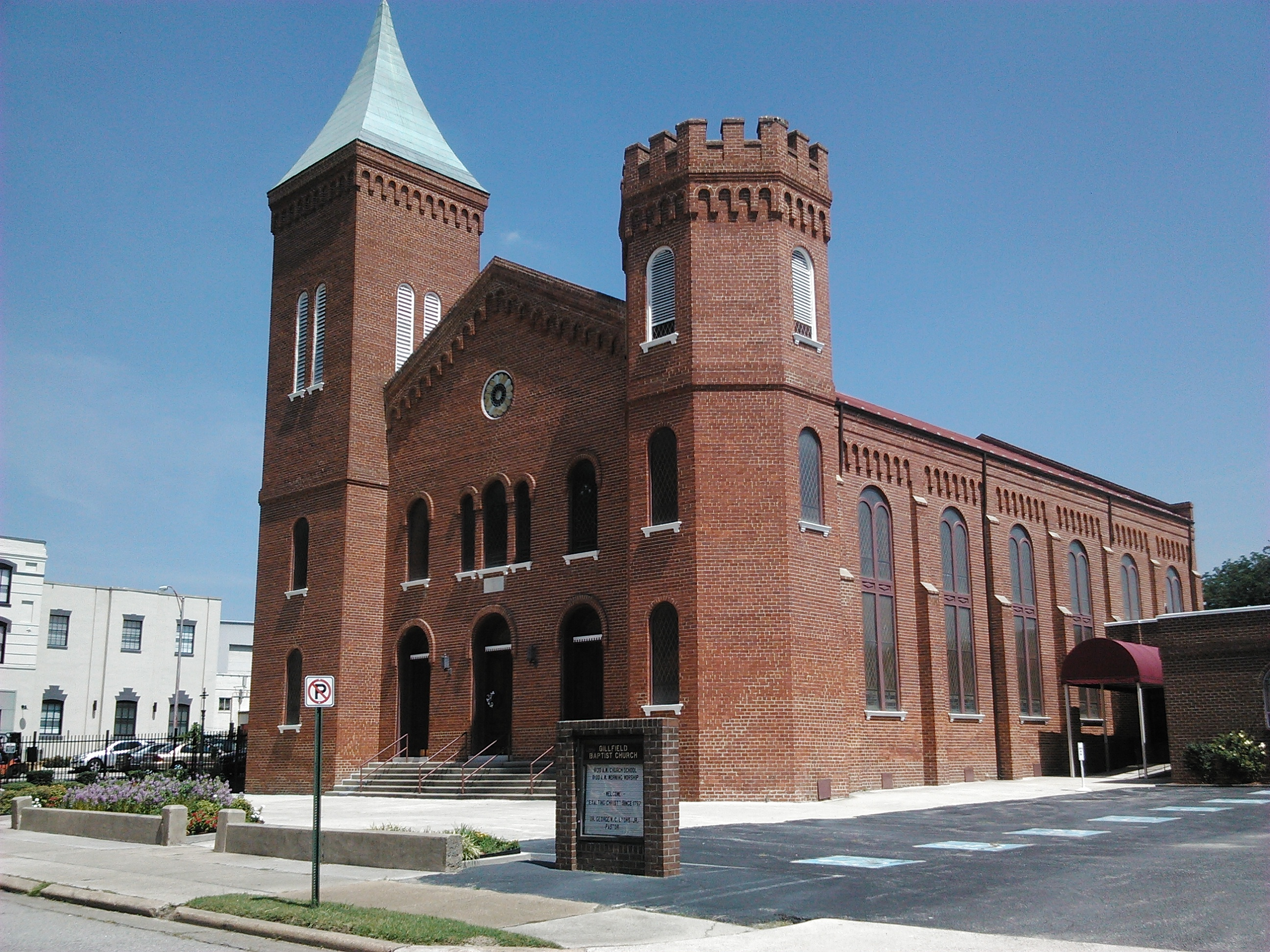
Gillfield Baptist Church, largest black congregation within the Portsmouth Association, preceding the north-south split and formation of Southern Baptist Convention in 1845

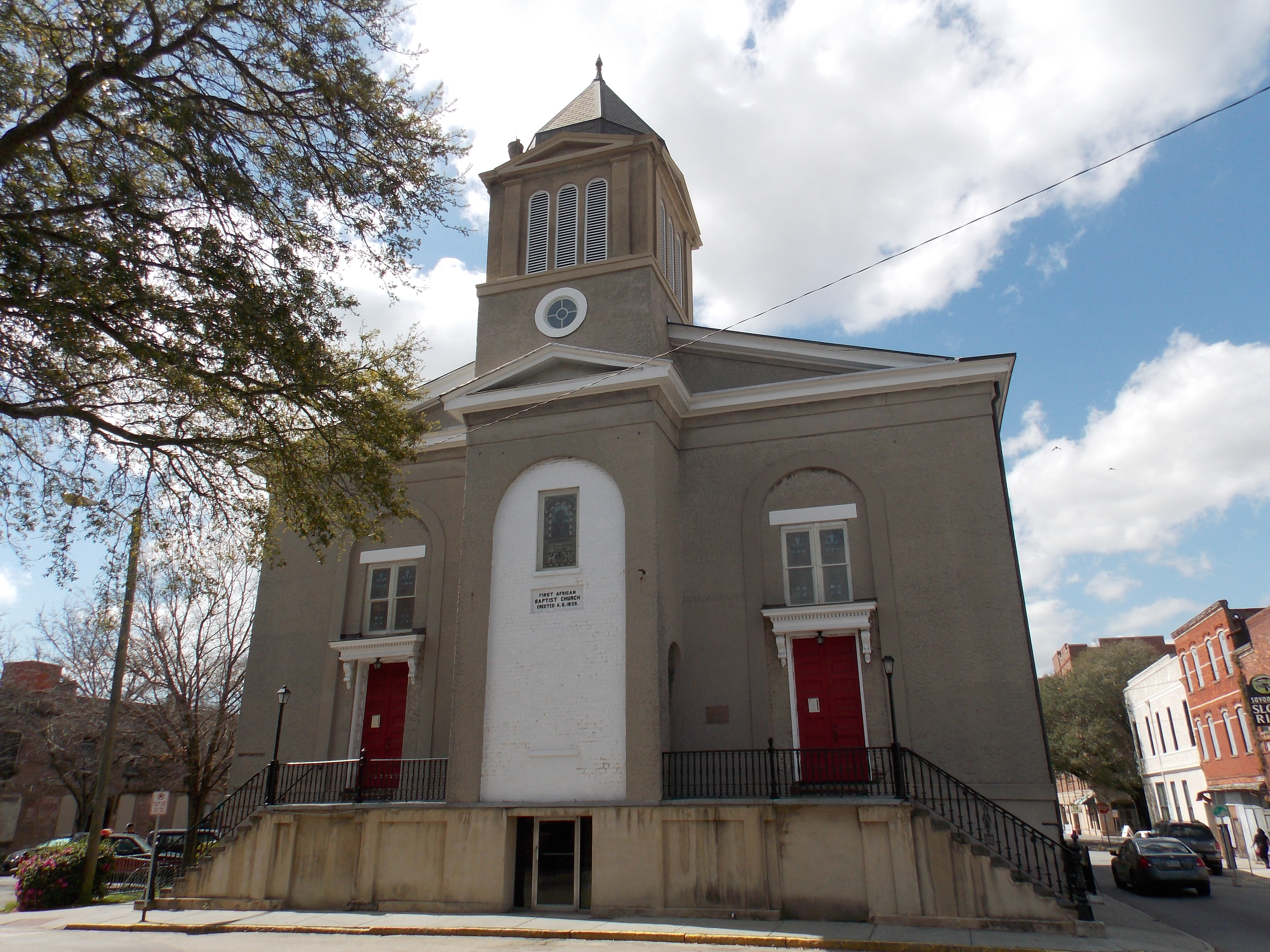
First African Baptist Church in Savannah, Georgia

The root of cooperative efforts amongst black Baptists began in the Antebellum period. Both free blacks and slaves were welcomed into the Baptist movement by missionaries in the First Great Awakening and Second Great Awakening. Independent black Baptist churches were formed in Petersburg, Virginia and Savannah, Georgia before the American Civil War. Under the slave societies of the South, they had to belong to white Baptist associations. Predominantly black congregations were required by law to have white ministers and supervision by law, especially after the slave rebellion of Nat Turner in 1831.

The first attempts at wider black Baptist cooperative efforts began with Ohio and Illinois. In 1834, black Baptists in Ohio formed the Providence Baptist Association. In 1838, black Baptists in Illinois formed the Wood River Baptist Association.

In 1840, black Baptists developed a cooperative movement beyond state lines. Baptists in New York and the Middle Atlantic states formed the American Baptist Missionary Convention. During the American Civil War in 1864, black Baptists of the West and South organized the Northwestern Baptist Convention and the Southern Baptist Convention.

Following the war in 1866, these two conventions met with the American Baptist Convention and formed the Consolidated American Baptist Convention. The new Consolidated American Baptist Convention began with supporting black Baptists in the South in the remains of the Confederacy.

After emancipation and with support from the Consolidated Convention, black Baptists formed their own state conventions, originally including Alabama, North Carolina, Virginia, Arkansas, and Kentucky. Despite this work, regionalism continued among black Baptists. In 1873, the black Baptists of the West formed the General Association of the Western States and Territories, and in 1874 the East organized the New England Baptist Missionary Convention. This continued regionalism and other factors caused the decline and eventual demise of the Consolidated American Baptist Convention.

According to historian Wilson Fallin Jr., black preachers interpreted the American Civil War as:

God's gift of freedom. They appreciated opportunities to exercise their independence, to worship in their own way, to affirm their worth and dignity, and to proclaim the fatherhood of God and the brotherhood of man. Most of all, they could form their own churches, associations, and conventions. These institutions offered self-help and racial uplift, and provided places where the gospel of liberation could be proclaimed. As a result, black preachers continued to insist that God would protect and help him; God would be their rock in a stormy land.

=== Convention founding ===
In 1880, about 150 Baptist pastors met in Montgomery, Alabama, forming the Baptist Foreign Mission Convention and electing William H. McAlpine as their president. This formation was somewhat a result of the demise of the Consolidated American Baptist Convention, as this death created a vacuum in mission work. In response to this void, William W. Colley of Virginia, who had served as a missionary to Nigeria under the Southern Baptist Convention during the 1870s, called for black Baptists to meet in Montgomery, Alabama to organize a national convention for extensive foreign missionary work.

In 1886, William J. Simmons of Kentucky led the formation of the American National Baptist Convention. In 1893, W. Bishop Johnson of Washington, D.C. led the formation of the National Baptist Education Convention, creating two more conventions. On September 24, 1895 at the Friendship Baptist Church in Atlanta, these three conventions fused into the National Baptist Convention of the United States of America, with the three former conventions serving as the three boards of the convention: foreign missions, home missions, and education.

=== Convention splits ===
In 1897, during the Elias Camp Morris administration, (Note: Elias Camp Morris (1855–1922) was founder of the National Baptist Convention. Morris earned his bachelor's degree from Roger Williams University (Nashville), his Doctor of Divinity degree in 1892 from the University of Louisville, and his PhD in 1902 from Alabama A&M University (Huntsville). He was the first, and up until his death, the only pastor of Centennial Baptist Church in Helena – a capacity he held for 43 years. He was the founder of the Arkansas Baptist College and served on its board of trustees for 38 years. At the time of his death, he had been the only African American of the executive committees of (i) the Baptist General Conference of North America, (ii) the Baptist World Alliance, and (iii) the Federal Council of the Churches of Christ of America. (OCLC 5163774068) ("Well Known Negro Minister Dies Here," Arkansas Democrat, September 5, 1922, p. 6; accessible via Newspapers.com at www.newspapers.com/image/165947884)) a group of National Baptist pastors left the convention and formed the Lott Carey Foreign Mission Convention. The separation was centered on two issues: the location of the foreign mission board and greater cooperation with White Baptists. During the same administration one year prior, Charles Harrison Mason and Charles Price Jones preached Wesleyan-Holiness doctrine in local Baptist churches, leading to their expulsion; these two would then become the founders of the Church of God in Christ and Church of Christ (Holiness).

The second major split came in 1915 over the ownership and operation of the National Baptist Publishing Board. The National Baptist Publishing Board was the most successful agency, led by R. H. Boyd. Leaders and pastors of the convention became suspicious of the actions of the board when they did not receive the reports they thought were due them, and a debate ensued.

Those who supported Boyd's view that the board was independent of the convention formed the National Baptist Convention of America. It became known as the Unincorporated Convention (now the National Baptist Convention of America, International). Because of the question of incorporation, leaders who remained in the original convention led a movement to incorporate their organization. The constitution was amended in 1916 and the convention was later incorporated, taking the name of National Baptist Convention, USA, Inc.

During the Joseph Jackson administration, a third split occurred over tenure and lack of support for the civil rights movement. The civil rights movement of the 1950s and 1960s, known for increased public activism, demonstrations, and protests was highly controversial in many Baptist churches, as ministers often preached spiritual salvation as opposed to political activism.

Jackson had supported the Montgomery bus boycott of 1956, but by 1960 told members they should not become involved in civil rights activism. Jackson was a close ally of Chicago's Mayor Richard J. Daley and Chicago Democrats. He opposed the public activism of Martin Luther King Jr. and his aide, the young Jesse Jackson Sr., (no relation to Joseph Jackson). Gardner C. Taylor of New York challenged Jackson for the presidency and lost.

After Jackson was re-elected and following a violent dispute at the convention involving one death, a group led by L. Venchael Booth formed a new convention at the Zion Baptist Church in Cincinnati, Ohio in 1961, naming themselves the Progressive National Baptist Convention. They supported the extensive activism of King's Southern Christian Leadership Conference and established ecumenical relations with the American Baptist Churches USA.

In 1992, Paul S. Morton of New Orleans, Louisiana formed a fellowship within the convention named the Full Gospel Baptist Church Fellowship, exploring spiritual gifts such as speaking in tongues, prophecy, exclamatory worship, etc. Its leadership later separated completely from the National Baptist Convention, USA after discrimination from the NBC's leadership, becoming one of the largest Full Gospel movements and one of the fastest growing new Baptist denominations in the United States.

In 2005, the National Baptist Convention of America, Progressive National Baptists, and National Missionary Baptists created the Joint National Baptist Convention with NBC USA, establishing a joint agenda for African American Baptists. By 2023, the conventions announced another joint session, held in January 2024. During this session, the four conventions were joined by President Dr. Gina Stewart of the Lott Carey Foreign Mission Convention, who became the first woman pastor to preach during the Joint National Baptist Convention.

=== Racial reconciliation ===
From 2015 to 2016, President Jerry Young collaborated with the Southern Baptist Convention on racial reconciliation. Meeting with President Ronnie Floyd of the SBC, 10 pastors from each convention were assembled to discuss race relations; in 2016, Young revealed several difficulties surrounding racial reconciliation to The New York Times, stating:

“I’ve never said this to Dr. Floyd, but I’ve had fellows in my own denomination who called me and said: ‘What are you doing? I mean, are you not aware of the history?'” “And I say, obviously I’m aware. They bring up the issue about slavery and that becomes a reason, they say, that we ought not to be involved with the Southern Baptists. Where from my vantage point, that’s reverse racism.” “I do understand the history, and I understand the pain of the past...But what I’m also quite clear about is, if the Gospel does anything at all, the Gospel demands that we not only preach but practice reconciliation.”

Floyd, describing 2015 as a "historic year of progress in racial healing," with the SBC and NBC collaborations, succeeds the election of Fred Luter Jr. as the Southern Baptist Convention's first African American president, alongside the adoption of an informal name, "Great Commission Baptists" which gained significant adoption by 2020.

=== Internal reform ===
In January 2025, President Boise Kimber's presidential administration began an internal reformation by promoting Christian education, young pastors and other Christian leaders, and women in ministry. At the 2025 Annual Session in September, on September 9, Tracey L. Brown became the first woman to preach at any NBC USA Annual Session. During the session, Kimber also addressed the National Baptist Convention's commitment to social justice advocacy.

== Statistics ==
According to a census published by the Baptist World Alliance in 2023, it self-reported a total of 21,145 churches and 8,415,100 members, an increase since 2010's 10,358 churches and 5,197,512 members, according to a separate study by the Association of Religion Data Archives. In another study by the World Council of Churches, the NBC had an estimated international membership of 7,500,000. According to the Association of Religion Data Archives in 2020, its membership was 1,567,741 in 2,530 U.S. churches.

Overall, the National Baptist Convention continues to remain one of the largest historically and predominantly African American or Black Christian denominations in the United States; separated bodies, such as the theologically conservative-to-moderate National Baptist Convention of America, have stagnated in membership (2000's 3,500,000 members across roughly 8,000 churches to 2022's 3,500,000 members across 4,000 churches) and the theologically moderate-to-liberal Progressive National Baptist Convention (2009's 1,010,000 members in 1,500 churches to 2022's 1,500,000 members in 1,362 churches) has increased according to the Baptist World Alliance. In contrast, ARDA's 2020 study documented the National Missionary Baptists as the largest predominantly black Baptist denomination in the United States, with the NBC USA second.

In 2014, the Pew Research Center estimated 23% of its membership were 65 and older; 36% aged 50–64; 30% aged 30–49; and 11% aged 18–29. In 2007, 14% of the National Baptist Convention's membership were aged 18–29; 35% aged 30–49; 29% aged 50–64; and 21% aged 65 and older. The largest generational group as of 2014 was the Baby boomers (43%); boomers were followed by Generation X (28%). The Silent Generation was the third largest (14%) and Millennials were fourth (13%). From 2007 to 2014, membership of Millennials and Generation X increased, replacing the Silent Generation (at 20% in 2007). Altogether, individuals aged from 18 to 49 made up 41% of the convention, while 59% were aged 50 and up in 2014. An estimated 61% of the National Baptist Convention was made up of women, and 39% men at the 2014 study. Ethnically, the convention remained predominantly African American (99%), with Hispanics and Latino Americans being the second largest group (1%). Less than 1% were White, and less than 1% each were Asian or of another race or ethnicity.

Theologically, 90% of the convention's membership believed in God with "absolute certainty," and 8% believed "fairly certainly." About 91% of the convention believed religion was "very important" and 8% considered it "somewhat important." At least 60% of National Baptists attended church weekly and 82% prayed at least daily; 54% of National Baptists attended bible study and Sunday schools weekly, and 23% seldom or never did so. The majority of its members read Scripture either weekly or once a week, and 64% believed all of the Bible should be taken literally. Of its Bible-reading population, 21% believed not all of the Bible should be taken literally, and 7% believed it was not the Word of God.

== Organization ==
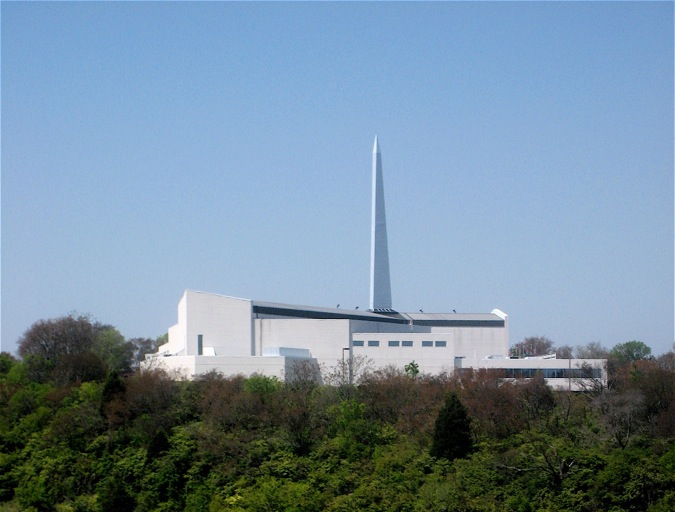
Headquarters of the convention in Nashville.

The National Baptist Convention is governed as a convention with similarities to a presbytery, yet allowing its member churches to govern themselves under the congregationalist polity. The NBC USA's churches—per its statement of faith—are led by pastors or bishops, and deacons. Within the Baptist tradition according to the 1689 Baptist Confession, the terms "pastor", "elder" and "bishop" constitute a single office.

=== Presidency ===
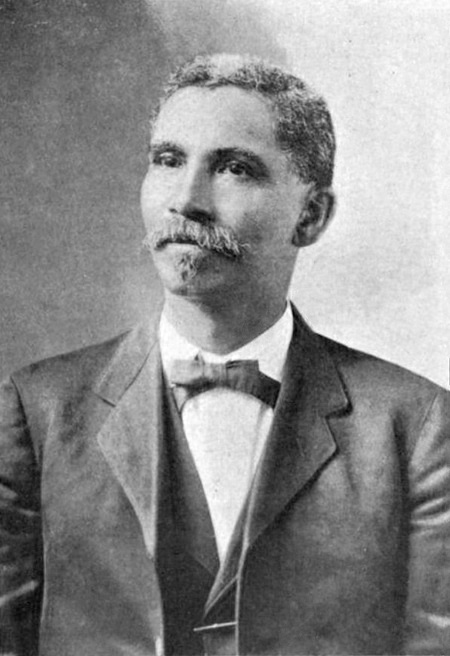
Pastor Elias Camp Morris, one of the founders of the National Baptist Convention

E. C. Morris was elected president of the National Baptist Convention USA in 1895 and served for 27 years. His tenure was important for laying the foundation of the convention. In addition to managing growth and organization of new chapters, his presidency founded the National Baptist Publishing House in Nashville, Tennessee; blacks wanted to publish literature written by their own ministers.

In 1890 under his presidency, the American Baptist Publication Society had refused to publish writings of black ministers because of resistance from their white Southern clients. This event, more than any other, inspired blacks to develop their own convention and publishing arm. One year after the formation of the convention, the National Baptist Publication Board was established under the leadership of Richard Boyd in Nashville, Tennessee. It was given the right to supply National Baptist churches with general ministry and Sunday school supplies. In a short time the publishing house became the largest black publishing enterprise in the world.

In 1902, the Woman's State Convention of Tennessee elected African American Virginia E. Walker Broughton, to serve as the first woman national corresponding Secretary for the National Baptist Convention. The twenty-seven years of Morris' leadership represented the formative period for the convention.

Upon the death of E. C. Morris, L. K. Williams became president of the convention in 1924. During his 16 years' tenure, he expanded the publishing board to gain increased support. Williams appointed L. G. Jordan as General Secretary of the Board and laid plans for a new building. The building was opened for inspection in 1925. On the recommendation of Williams, it was named the Morris Building in honor of the legacy of E. C. Morris. The NBC USA's Layman's Department was also established. He also promoted collaboration with the Southern Baptist Convention and organized the American Baptist Theological Seminary (present-day American Baptist College).

David V. Jemison succeeded Williams as president of the convention in 1940. His two major accomplishments during his 13 years were paying off the mortgage on the Morris Memorial Building and the purchase of the Bath House for African American use in the resort of Hot Springs, Arkansas.

In 1953, Joseph H. Jackson of Chicago became the NBC USA president, serving until 1982. His 29-year tenure was the longest of any president, and spanned some of the most active years of the civil rights movement. During these years, African Americans gained passage of federal laws protecting and enforcing their rights to public access and voting, especially in the South. Among President Jackson's many contributions were new commissions and restructuring of the convention. He also purchased the National Baptist Freedom Farm and set up an unrestricted scholarship at Roosevelt University. He was noted for low tolerance of dissent. He said that social protests were not enough, but people needed to prove their economic productivity as well.

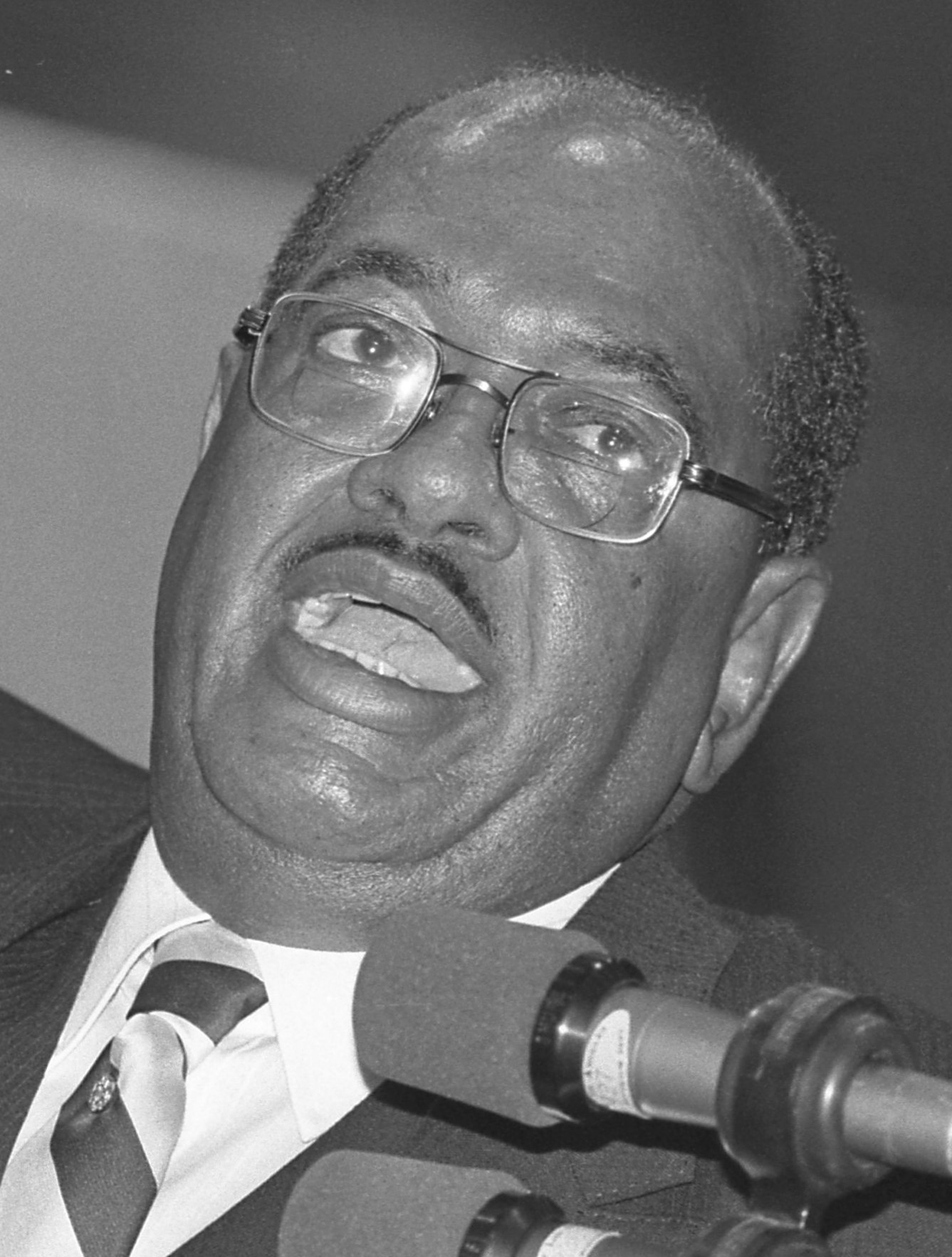
Pastor T. J. Jemison

In 1983, T. J. Jemison became president of the convention, serving for 12 years. He completed construction of the Baptist World Center, a headquarters for the convention in Nashville, Tennessee. He spoke out on public issues more than some presidents, and expressed his opposition to the Gulf War. In a controversial statement, he spoke in favor of the noted African American boxer Mike Tyson, who had been convicted of rape. The uproar caused by Jemison's remarks translated into a deep decline of membership and associated churches in the convention in 1992. Later presidents built up the national convention again.

Henry Lyons of Florida was elected president in 1994. The Lyons tenure was characterized by much activity as he established a unified program, reduced the debt on the Baptist World Center, and dissolved the debt on the Sunday School Publishing Board. In addition, many commissions were added to the convention. Legal problems, however, forced Lyons to resign from the presidency after he was convicted of stealing approximately $4 million on homes, jewelry, and a mistress. Lyons unsuccessfully ran again for president in 2009 with National Congress President, R.B. Holmes of Tallahassee, Florida, as his vice-president.

Stewart Cleveland Cureton, vice president-at-large, took over the leadership of the convention in 1999 and served the remainder of Lyons' tenure, where he was succeeded by J.R. Scruggs.

Julius R. Scruggs of Huntsville, Alabama was elected president in 2009 and served one 5-year term. He did not seek re-election. In September 2014, Jerry Young of Mississippi was elected president, with some of its members expecting progressive teaching and administration. During Young's presidency—in 2022—U.S. Vice President Kamala Harris spoke during the 142nd Annual Session of the National Baptist Convention in Houston, Texas stating, "faith requires action" as she called on African American faith leaders to continue fighting for inalienable rights toward all, remarking the following as Baptists have historically advocated for the separation of church and state:

"A constitutional right that hadn't been recognized was taken away from the women of America, and people of America, and on this issue I feel very strongly...one does not have to abandon their faith or their religious beliefs to agree that a woman should be able to make that decision about her own body, and her government should not be making that decision for her...this is this is not about partisanship. It's not about who you voted for in the last election, or who you plan to vote for in the next election. In terms of political ideology, it's just a very practical principle, which is women should have the power to make decisions about their own bodies. It's that basic."

She also publicly commended her Baptist pastor who has been a member of the convention while also dually affiliating with the American Baptist Churches USA (previously known as the Northern Baptist Convention). Her presence stirred controversy among several white evangelical Protestants and Southern Baptists, deriding black Baptists.

On January 13, 2025, Young was succeeded in office by Rev. Boise Kimber who was consecrated and installed as the new denominational president; succeeding Young, he began a reformation within the convention by prioritizing the restoration of the denominational headquarters, promoting Christian education, young pastors and other Christian leaders, and women in ministry.

=== State conventions ===
The National Baptist Convention's members form voluntary state and territory-wide local conventions. The state conventions are autonomous organizations and separately incorporated; some conventions are dually aligned with other Baptist conventional denominations. Within these conventions, churches are organized by district associations, which are usually led by district moderators.

=== Congress of Christian Education ===
The National Baptist Congress of Christian Education is the training arm of the convention; it is an annual event, held in June that the convention claims draws more than 50,000 attendees from around the United States and the world.

=== Sunday School Publishing Board ===
The Sunday School Publishing Board is the official publisher of the convention and provides all of the educational resources of the convention. The board was founded in 1915 following disputes between R. H. Boyd and the convention, and is one of the largest African American owned publishing companies. The Sunday School Publishing Board supplies books, textbooks, curriculum and other resources.

=== Laymen and women's ministries ===
The National Baptist Laymen's Movement is the men's ministry within the convention. It was organized at the 43rd Annual Session of the National Baptist Convention in Los Angeles, California, in 1923. Also, notably led by Sarah Willie Layton and Nannie Helen Burroughs, the National Baptist Women's Auxiliary is the women's organizational arm of the convention.

=== Missions and humanitarianism ===
The convention has a missionary organization, the National Baptist Foreign Mission Board. Its missionary organization primarily supports missions work throughout Africa, the Caribbean, and Central America. Its African missions are located in Liberia, Sierra Leone, Guinea, Nigeria, South Africa, Lesotho, Eswatini, Malawi, Zambia, and Kenya. Its Caribbean missions are mainly in Trinidad and Tobago. It also has a humanitarian organization, NBC USA Disaster Management.

=== Dual alignment ===
Known to occur though infrequently, a state convention, district association or member church of the National Baptist Convention may dually align with another organization. The autonomous make-up of the NBC USA gives local congregations the latitude to govern themselves and contribute to the causes of other religious bodies as it deems necessary. Some members dually align with the Lott Carey Foreign Mission Convention which offers the NBC USA member a convention-wide focus on foreign missions; others may align with the National Baptist Convention of America, Progressive National Baptists, or Full Gospel Baptist Church Fellowship—organizations which formed in schism from the NBC USA; there are also dually aligned affiliates with the American Baptist Churches USA such as Abyssinian Baptist Church.

== Doctrine ==
The National Baptist Convention has a Baptist confession of faith, which is a derivative of the New Hampshire Confession of Faith. Members of the convention also adopt Keach's Catechism, the 1689 Baptist Confession of Faith, and a church covenant. As such, the National Baptist Convention in its Baptist ethos maintains Trinitarianism, justification by grace, evangelism, believers' baptism, and the separation of church and state among its uncompromising essentials to every member of the denomination. The National Baptist Convention also acknowledges a two-fold office of the pastor or bishop, and the deacon (the terms "pastor" and "bishop" being synonymous).

=== Ordination of women ===
The convention does not make official positions binding on its member congregations, state conventions, and institutions. In 1965, Trudy Trimm became the first ordained woman pastor in the convention. There are many women ordained and/or licensed and serving in the convention affiliated congregations. A number of women serve as pastors of congregations, and as trustees to the boards of American Baptist College. Some congregations do not ordain or license women as ministers. Some congregations have women deacons, others as deaconess, some have both.

Two National Baptist women pastors have been elected as presidents of state conventions. Patricia A. Gould-Champ, senior pastor of Faith Community Baptist Church in Richmond, Virginia, was elected as the 35th and first female president of the Baptist General Convention of Virginia in 2003. Marylin Monroe Harris, senior pastor of the First Baptist Church of Teaneck in Teaneck, NJ, became president for the United Missionary Baptist Convention State of New Jersey; the 2nd vice moderator of the North Jersey District Missionary Baptist Association; the former president of the Black Clergy Council of Englewood, Teaneck and Vicinity; and the moderator of the Essex Association of the American Baptist Churches of New Jersey; and the first female African American chaplain of the Teaneck Fire Department.

=== Same-sex marriage ===
"The National Baptist Convention USA Inc. does not have an 'official' position on any issues with regards to homosexuality." (Note: "A Statement on the Same-sex Marriage Issue, Voting and Christian Responsibility" (primary source link Archived 2020-01-14 at the Wayback Machine), National Baptist Convention, USA, Inc. June 21, 2012) The National Baptist Convention released an official position statement in 2012 that defines marriage as the exclusive union of a man and a woman. A subsequent position statement in 2014 prohibited the convention's military chaplains from officiating same-sex marriages or civil unions stating that they "are not to participate in any activity that implies or condones same sex marriage or same sex union." (Note: "Policy Statement and Guidelines to Chaplains Regarding Same-Gender Couples: Same Sex Marriage and Related Activities" (primary source link Archived 7 March 2016 at the Wayback Machine), by The Office of the Ecclesiastical Endorser, National Baptist Convention, USA, Inc., January 27, 2014) In 2006 the organization stated that a majority of their member churches would hold that homosexuality is not a legitimate expression of God's will and would be opposed to ordaining active homosexuals or lesbians for any type of ministry in their church. Nevertheless, given the denomination's diversity, some pastors and congregations affiliated with the National Baptist Convention announced their support for same-sex marriage. "The National Baptist Convention, USA, Incorporated does not dictate to its constituent churches what position to take on issues because we believe in the autonomy of the local church."

=== Abortion ===
Likewise, the National Baptist Convention allows its congregations to decide whether they support or oppose abortion.

== Schools ==
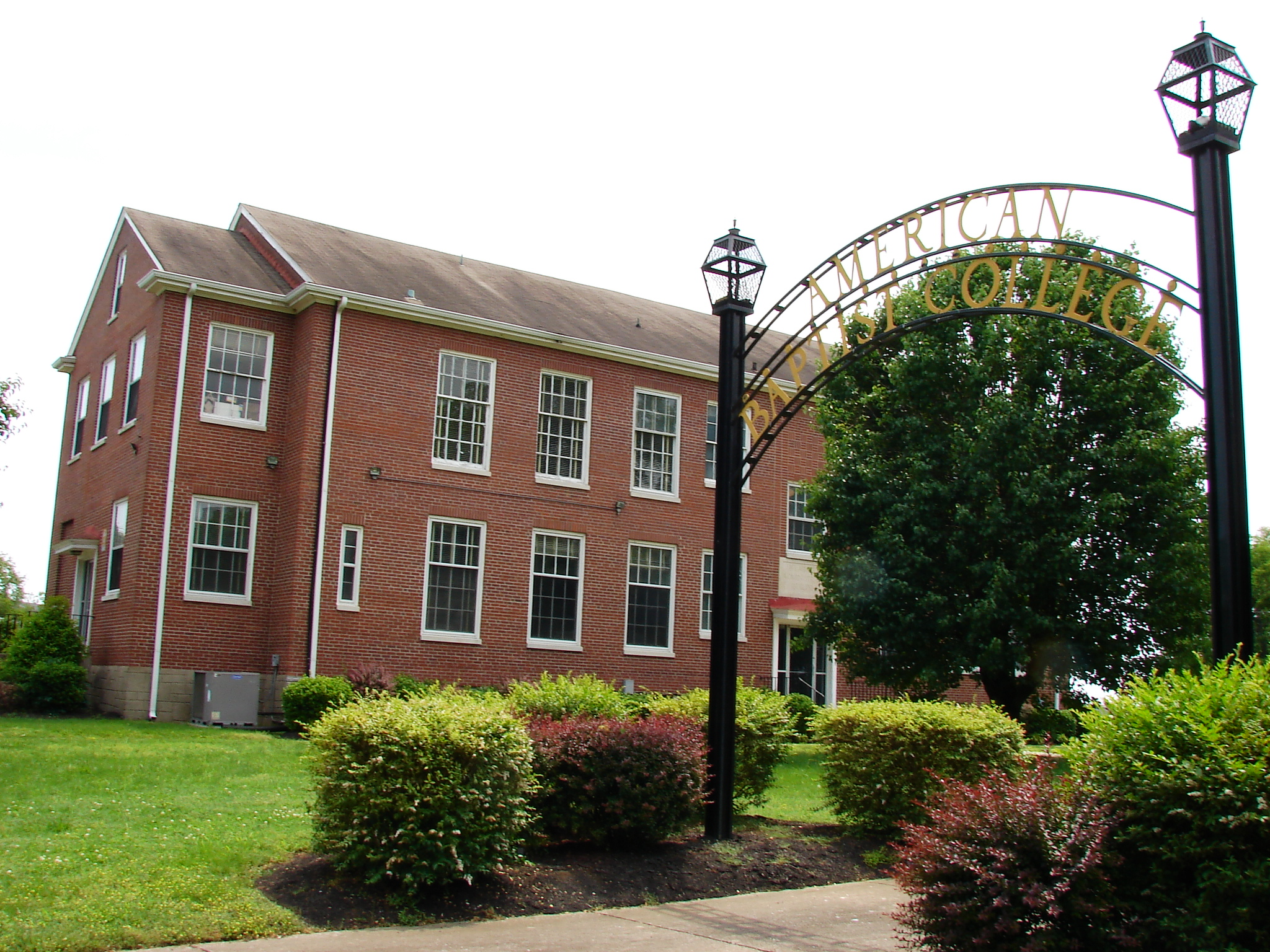
American Baptist College

The National Baptist Convention is one of the predominantly and historically African American Christian denominations in the United States with at least four colleges and universities affiliated with it solely. Among them, American Baptist College—located in Nashville, Tennessee—has been the primarily promoted higher education system. Additionally, Morehouse College has been affiliated with the convention alongside Shaw University and Selma University. The American Baptist Churches USA-affiliated institutions of Virginia Union University, Florida Memorial University, and Virginia University of Lynchburg have also affiliated with the convention.

== See also ==
- Baptists in the United States
- Black church
- Cecelia Adkins, executive director of Sunday School Publishing Board
- Christianity in the United States
- Bible
- Born again
- Baptist beliefs
- Jesus Christ
- Believers' Church
- Religion in Black America
