= L. Venchael Booth =

American Baptist leader

Lavaughan Venchael Booth (January 7, 1919 – November 16, 2002) was a Baptist pastor and leader in the United States, the founder and first President of the Progressive National Baptist Convention.

== Biography ==
Booth was born in Collins, Mississippi. He graduated from Hopewell High School in Hopewell, Covington County, Mississippi in 1936 and has a bachelor's degree from Alcorn A&M (1940). He also studied at Gammon Theological Seminary and graduated from Howard University's School of Religion in 1943 with honors and as president of his class.

He was the pastor of Cincinnati's Zion Baptist Church for three decades and was the first African American trustee of the University of Cincinnati.

He founded the Progressive National Baptist Convention in 1961 and was elected first President of the Convention. He also established the Marva Collins Preparatory School in 1990. A lawsuit by Marva Collins alleges the K-8 school in Cincinnati infringes on her trademark teaching method and name.
