= T. J. Jemison =

American clergyman and civil rights activist (1918–2013)

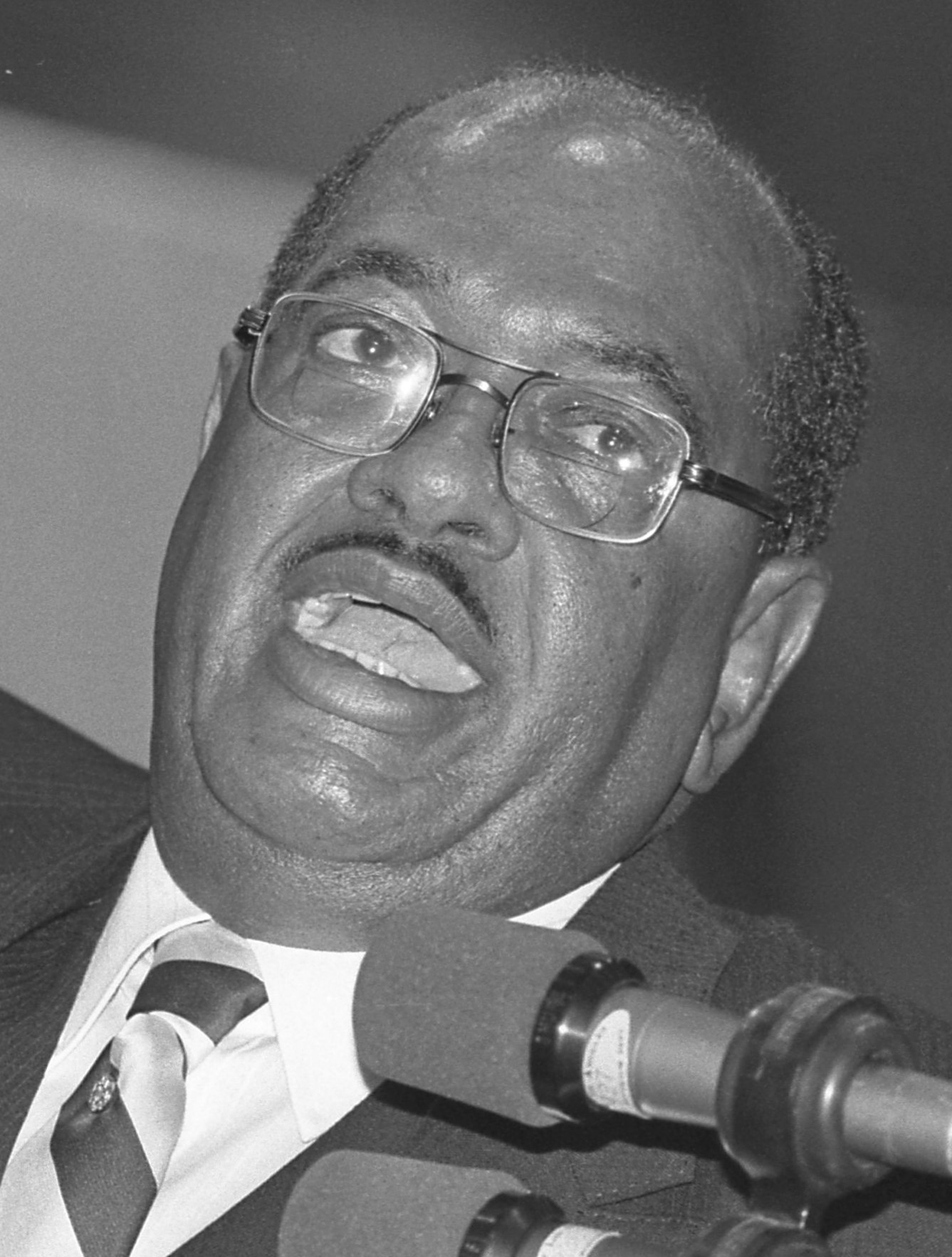
- Jemison in 1983
- Born: August 1, 1918; Selma, Alabama, U.S.
- Died: November 15, 2013 (aged 95); Baton Rouge, Louisiana, U.S.
- Resting place: Green Oaks Memorial Park in Baton Rouge
- Education: Alabama State University; Virginia Union University; New York University
- Occupations: Clergyman, civil rights activist
- Political party: Democratic
- Spouse: Widower since 2010
- Children: Diane Jemison Pollard; Bettye Wagner; Ted Jemison

Theodore Judson Jemison (August 1, 1918 – November 15, 2013), better known as T. J. Jemison, was minister of Mount Zion First Baptist Church in Baton Rouge, Louisiana in June 1953 when he led a bus boycott to protest the city's segregated public transit. It was the first boycott of its kind in the modern civil rights movement. He quickly organized a free-ride system to offer car transportation to the city's black residents while the boycott was in effect. This system was studied by Martin Luther King Jr. and served as a model two years later during the Montgomery bus boycott.

In 1957, Jemison was one of the founding members of the Southern Christian Leadership Conference. From 1982 to 1994, he served as president of the National Baptist Convention, USA, which was the nation's largest African-American religious organization.

== Background ==
Theodore Judson Jemison was born in August 1918 in Selma, Alabama. He was the youngest of six children of Henrietta and David V. Hemison. Theodore came from a family of prominent ministers and strong churchgoing women. His father, the Reverend Jemison, was pastor of the Tabernacle Baptist Church. Theodore attended local segregated public schools.

He earned a bachelor's degree from Alabama State University, a historically black college in the state capital of Montgomery, where he joined the Alpha Phi Alpha fraternity. To prepare for the ministry, he obtained a divinity degree at Virginia Union University in Richmond, Virginia. He later did graduate study at New York University in New York City.

== Career ==
In 1949, Jemison was first called as a minister by Mt. Zion First Baptist Church in Baton Rouge. At the time, his father was President of the National Baptist Convention, the association of African-American Baptist churches established in 1895. As a new minister, T. J. Jemison was focused mainly on internal church matters, such as fundraising and overseeing construction of a new church building. Within a few years, however, he would become involved in a pivotal early action of the civil rights movement.

=== Baton Rouge bus boycott ===
In 1950, Baton Rouge had ended black-owned buses, thereby requiring all city residents to use the public transit system that enforced segregated seating. It was racially segregated by law; in practice, black citizens had to sit at the back half of the bus or stand, even if seats in the front "white" section were empty. Jemison said later he was struck by "watching buses pass by his church and seeing black people standing in the aisles, not allowed by law to sit down in seats reserved for whites. 'I thought that was just out of order, that was just cruel'."

African Americans, who comprised 80 percent of the bus passengers in Baton Rouge, were fed up with standing on buses while "white" seats remained empty, particularly after the bus company raised fares from ten to fifteen cents in January 1953. Rev. Jemison took up the issue with the Baton Rouge City Council; he testified on February 11, 1953, against the fare increase and asked for an end of the practice of reserving so many seats for whites. The City Council partially met his demand, without abolishing segregation per se. They passed Ordinance 222, which stipulated a first come-first served policy: it allowed black passengers to board the bus from the back and take any empty seats available, while white passengers boarded from the front. In actuality though, the white drivers largely ignored the ordinance and continued to pressure and harass blacks into sitting in the rear of the buses.

On June 15, 1953, Martha White tested Ordinance 222 by taking an empty bus seat in a front row that was traditionally reserved for whites (Jemison had tried a similar test himself recently). The enraged bus driver threatened to have her arrested and called the police. Jemison intervened on her behalf, saying she was acting legally within the City Council ordinance. A bus company manager showed up and ordered the driver to comply with the new law. When the driver refused, the manager suspended him. This triggered a strike by the bus drivers' union. The strike ended four days later when state Attorney General Fred S. LeBlanc declared Ordinance 222 unconstitutional on the grounds that it violated the state's compulsory segregation laws.

At this point, on June 19, Jemison called for a bus boycott. He met with leaders of the city's black churches and formed the United Defense League. They quickly set up a massive private carpool network of free rides to assist residents boycotting public transit. This was a significant logistical accomplishment of the Baton Rouge bus boycott. By the third day, the city's buses were almost entirely empty.

All told, the boycott lasted six days. Jemison and the other church leaders ended it on June 25 after successfully negotiating with the City Council to pass a new compromise ordinance, which reinstated the first-come, first-served policy from Ordinance 222, but with a modification. To comply with state segregation laws, buses would now reserve the two front sideway seats for white passengers, and the back bench for black passengers, while allowing anyone to sit in the middle. Blacks and whites were prohibited from sitting next to one another within this arrangement. Although the boycott did not abolish segregated buses in Baton Rouge, it did force concessions that resulted in more total seats for black passengers. While a number of boycotters wanted to continue the action to confront segregation directly, the majority approved the compromise.

The Baton Rouge prototype for running a bus boycott—including the private carpool system and the nightly mass meetings with the black community to review the day's problems and progress—was later adopted by the organizers of the Montgomery bus boycott. In December 1955 when Montgomery's boycott was starting, Martin Luther King Jr. telephoned Jemison for guidance. In his book Stride Toward Freedom (1958), King wrote that Jemison's "painstaking description of the Baton Rouge experience proved invaluable." In Parting the Waters, Taylor Branch referred to Jemison as King's "old friend and first adviser as a protest leader".

=== Presidency of the National Baptist Convention ===
Early in his career, Jemison became involved with the National Baptist Convention, USA (NBC USA), which at the time was the nation's largest black religious organization. From 1953 to 1982, he served as the organization's secretary. In 1982, he was elected NBC USA president, and held the post until 1994. His signature achievement was overseeing construction of the national headquarters, the Baptist World Center in Nashville, Tennessee.

During his tenure, Jemison led the NBC USA into liberal political activism by supporting the presidential candidacy of Rev. Jesse Jackson in 1984 and 1988; speaking out against the nomination of Clarence Thomas, a conservative African American as an associate justice of the United States Supreme Court; and objecting to U.S. intervention in the Gulf War.

=== Later controversies ===
Jemison's last few years as NBC USA president were marked by controversy. He publicly defended boxer Mike Tyson who was charged in 1991 with the rape of Desiree Washington, a contestant in the Miss Black America beauty pageant. Jemison said that Tyson was a victim of racial stereotyping, prompting other church leaders and women's groups to rebuke Jemison as insensitive to Ms. Washington. Jemison's position was strongly criticized inside the NBC USA and contributed to a decline in membership.

Approaching the end of his tenure (a result of term limits), Jemison selected W. Franklyn Richardson as his successor, but Richardson was defeated by Henry Lyons at the 1994 convention. Jemison filed a lawsuit in an attempt to overturn the result. Eventually, through the appeals process, the election of Lyons was upheld. Jemison, a co-plaintiff, and their counsel, were ordered to pay $150,000 in punitive damages. In a subsequent court order, they were also required to pay the other side's attorney fees. The court found that Jemison had fabricated evidence to justify the lawsuit.

== Legacy and honors ==
- Jun 19–21, 2003, the 50th anniversary of the bus boycott and its participants were honored with a community forum and three days of events; organizers were Marc Sternberg, a 30-year-old resident, Southern University, Louisiana State University, and major organizations. Sternberg said, "Before Dr. King had a dream, before Rosa kept her seat, and before Montgomery took a stand, Baton Rouge played its part."
- 2007, Mt. Zion First Baptist Church established the annual T. J. Jemison Race Relations Award in his honor. It was first awarded that year to Jesse Bankston, a longtime Democratic politician in Baton Rouge.

== Death ==
On November 15, 2013, T. J. Jemison died in Baton Rouge at the age of 95.

On March 11, 2017, Jemison was among five persons inducted into the Louisiana Political Museum and Hall of Fame in Winnfield. He was cited posthumously for his pioneering work in the Southern Christian Leadership Conference and his pastorate of the Mount Zion First Baptist Church in Baton Rouge.
