= Talbert W. Swan II =

COGIC minister: Bishop of Vermont Ecclesiastical Jurisdiction

His Grace The Right Reverend Dr. Talbert Wesley Swan II
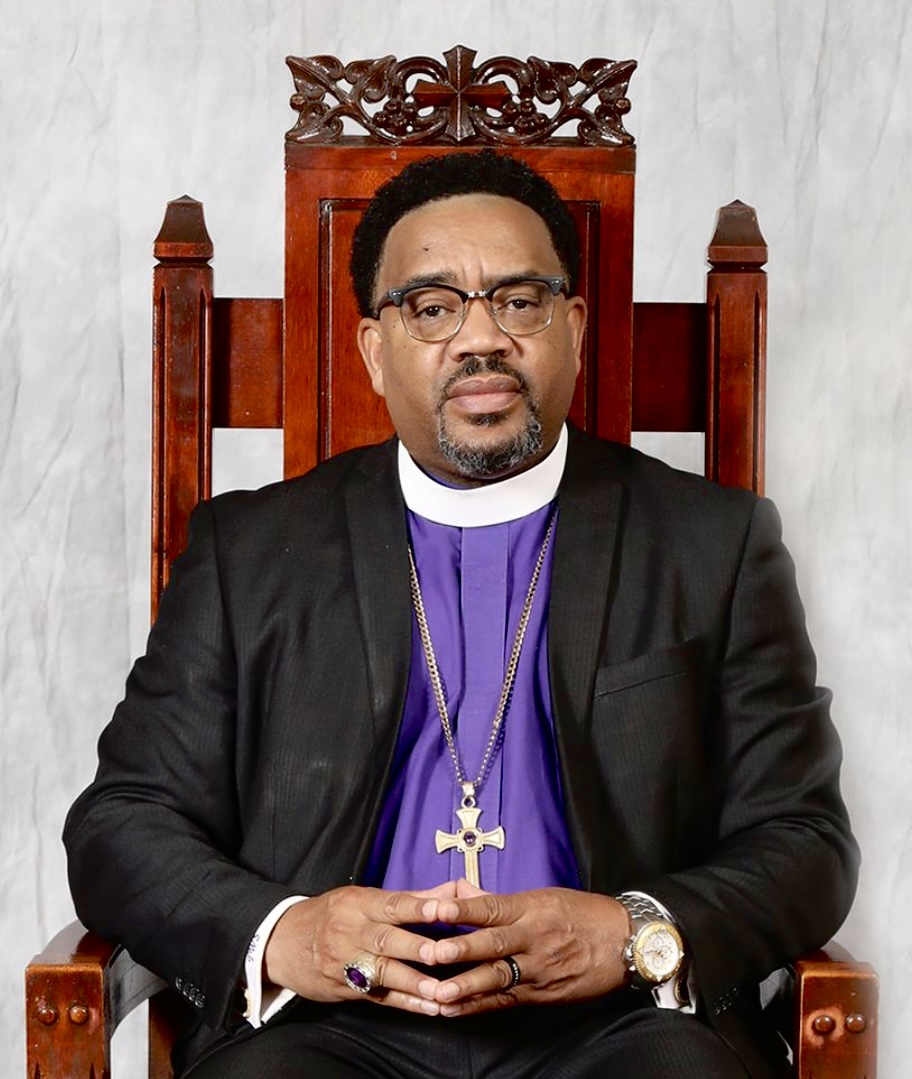
- Archdiocese: Massachusetts
- Diocese: Massachusetts Greater Ecclesiastical Jurisdiction, United States of America
- Appointed: December 2025
- Installed: April 2026
- Predecessor: Bishop Bryant Robinson, Jr.
- Other posts: Assistant General Secretary, General Board Clerk, Director of Social Justice Ministry
- Previous posts: Auxiliary Bishop of Greater Massachusetts (2014–2016), Bishop of Nova Scotia (2016–2022), Bishop of Vermont (2022-2026)

Orders
- Ordination: August 15, 1991 by Louis C. Young
- Consecration: November 9, 2014 by Charles Edward Blake, Sr.

Personal details
- Born: April 24, 1965 (age 61) Springfield, Massachusetts, U.S.
- Denomination: Church of God in Christ
- Spouse: Cynthia Ann Davis Swan
- Children: 10
- Education: Hartford Seminary; Gordon Conwell Theological Seminary; Harvard Divinity School; Carolina University
- Motto: Bless His Name

Styles of Talbert Wesley Swan II
- Reference style: His Grace; The Right Reverend
- Spoken style: Your Grace
- Religious style: Bishop

Talbert Wesley Swan II (born April 24, 1965) is an American religious leader. He is a prelate in the Church of God in Christ serving as the bishop of the Massachusetts Greater Ecclesiastical Jurisdiction in the United States. Swan is the fifth leader of the jurisdiction and oversees COGIC congregations throughout Massachusetts and in contiguous states. Swan serves the Church of God in Christ as assistant general secretary, general board clerk, and director of Social Justice Ministry. Swan is also the National Chaplain of Iota Phi Theta fraternity and the host of a radio talk show, The Spoken Word.

Swan has faced criticism including accusations of being a "rabble-rouser" who supports Black nationalism. While Dr. Swan has faced criticism from some commentators who have characterized his rhetoric as controversial, his decades-long record of public service and advocacy has also earned widespread recognition as a leading voice for civil rights and community reform. As president of the Greater Springfield NAACP, he has been actively involved in efforts addressing police accountability, voting rights, and economic inequality, and has participated in initiatives such as coalitions to combat food insecurity and community violence. Local and regional reporting has highlighted his role in advancing police reform discussions following federal findings of civil rights violations in Springfield and his ongoing engagement with public officials to improve community relations. He has also received multiple awards for social justice advocacy and has been recognized for his sustained commitment to uplifting marginalized communities and addressing systemic inequities.

== Early life ==
Talbert Swan was born in Springfield, Massachusetts, and is the son of Fred Allen Swan, Sr. and DeLois Fason Swan. He attended Van Sickle Junior High School and Classical High School in Springfield, and the University of Massachusetts in Amherst.

== Education ==
He earned a Bachelor of Science in computer science from Western New England University and an Associate of Science and Bachelor of Science in religious studies from Charter Oak State College, before attending the Hartford Seminary where he earned a Master of Arts in theology. Swan earned graduate certificates in Faith Based Community and Economic Development from Harvard Divinity School and attended Gordon-Conwell Theological Seminary, graduating Magna Cum Laude with a Master of Divinity in Urban Ministry. Bishop Swan completed his Doctor of Ministry (D.Min.) at Carolina University, where his research focused on developing a practical ministry model to strengthen the social witness of congregations through structured community engagement, leadership development, and collaborative partnerships. His work bridges theological conviction with actionable strategies that address social and economic challenges in urban communities.

== Career ==
=== Ordination and early ministry ===
Swan was ordained as an elder by Bishop Louis C. Young on August 15, 1991. Swan served as youth minister at the Spring of Hope Church of God in Christ before founding the Solid Rock Church of God in Christ in 1994. In January 2009, the Solid Rock and Spring of Hope Churches merged and Swan was installed as pastor on May 31, 2009.

Swan has served the Church of God in Christ in the Office of the General Secretary since 2001. During that time he served as: special assistant to the general secretary, assistant general secretary for statistics, and currently as the assistant general secretary/administration. Swan also serves the denomination as clerk of the general board and the director of Social Justice Ministry. He previously served as associate White House liaison, and senior advisor to Presiding Bishop Charles Edward Blake, Sr.

=== Ministry as bishop ===
On April 3, 2014, Swan was appointed Auxiliary Bishop of the Greater Massachusetts Ecclesiastical Jurisdiction by Charles Edward Blake, Sr., Presiding bishop, and the General Board of the Church of God in Christ. His appointment was ratified by the General Assembly and he was consecrated bishop on November 9, 2014, during the 107th Annual Holy Convocation.

On June 6, 2016, Blake named Swan the third bishop of the Nova Scotia Ecclesiastical Jurisdiction. Swan oversaw all member churches in the Nova Scotia province as well as congregations in Massachusetts, New York, and Pennsylvania. He officially received his episcopal assignment during the 109th Annual Holy Convocation on November 13, 2016. He served in that post until January 2022.

In January 2022, Swan was appointed prelate of the Vermont Ecclesiastical Jurisdiction by Presiding Bishop John Drew Sheard Sr. Swan succeeded Bishop Loran Mann, who died in May 2021. Bishop Mann also served as a member of the denomination's General Board, the Executive Branch of government.

On December 8, 2025, Presiding Bishop John Drew Sheard Sr., with the unanimous approval of the general board, appointed Swan as prelate of the Massachusetts Greater Ecclesiastical Jurisdiction, succeeding the late bishop Bryant Robinson, Jr. As prelate, Swan oversees member churches throughout Massachusetts and contiguous states.

== Advocacy ==
Swan is the president of the Greater Springfield NAACP. In 2022 he was reelected to his seventh 2 year. He has advocated for police reform, voting rights, and community responsibility. Defeating his rival by a three-to-one margin in the 2011 election for president of the Greater Springfield NAACP, Swan's election reportedly created anticipation of a resurgence of social activism in the region. The Valley Advocate noted that this led to a revitalization of the organization and its voice on critical community issues. Swan outlined the priorities of the branch as taking a renewed focus on education, health, economic empowerment, political action and social justice advocacy.

Bishop Swan has been in high demand as a speaker, preacher, and presenter across the nation. He has spoken on over 40 college campuses, was a keynote speaker for the annual worship service of the 112th NAACP National Convention, Black Excellence on the Hill by the MA Black and Latino Caucus, the 50th, 57th, 58th, and 60th anniversaries of the March on Washington, the 60th Anniversary Conclave of Iota Phi Theta Fraternity, The 61st National Convention of the National Conference of Negro Women, and the 54th Congressional Black Caucus Annual Legislative Conference.

=== Police reform ===
Swan, a longtime advocate for police reform, first came to national attention in the wake of receiving a harassing telephone call from Joseph Bradley, a Springfield police officer. Bradley made the call from the Public Safety office of Western New England University and mocked the burning of black churches in the south. The call was made July 2, 1996, the day Swan was hosting a service to raise funds to assist southern churches that had been burned. After confirming that the racist call was made by Bradley, Springfield Deputy Chief of Police Daniel Spellacy apologized to Swan, his congregation, and the African American community, and Mayor Michael Albano vowed that the city would not tolerate such racist acts. Mayor Albano said that the call to Swan "borders on crisis" and announced the formation of a community coalition to deal with racial tensions.

Responding to the dismissal of assault charges against white police officer, Jeffrey Asher, who was caught on video kicking a handcuffed Roy Parker in the head, Swan organized a rally attracting hundreds, that was held across from Springfield City Hall. Citing the reluctance of those in leadership to condemn Asher's actions because of Parker's prior criminal history, Swan condemned the silence of elected officials and clergy. He noted that "an open condemnation of this incident is long overdue" and that "the silence of those in leadership is shameful." Asher was eventually arraigned on assault charges, but was eventually cleared of the criminal charges. The Police Commission suspended him for one year and ordered him to undergo "sensitivity training." Asher's suspension was reduced to six months by a labor arbitrator, with Asher receiving $20,000 in back pay.

Swan was the recipient of a racist fax by Springfield Police, a charge denied by the department. Swan reported that he received a fax laced with racial slurs and a warning to "leave our Police Department alone." In spite of the denial from the department, the telephone number displayed on the fax was that of a police department fax machine. The Springfield police launched an investigation into Swan, accusing him of sending the faxes to himself. District Attorney William Bennett met with Swan and asked to issue an apology to the Police Department. Swan refused and viewed the actions of the department as the latest in a series of harassing acts dating back to the racist telephone call received from Officer Joseph Bradley. Noting that Swan had made enemies "both among the old guard in the black community and among whites who don't appreciate his efforts to shake up a system that works pretty well for them," Valley Advocate Editor Tom Vannah opined that the rumors regarding the fax incident, although unproven, may have been "damaging enough to undercut the work" Swan's tried to do.

Swan sought an independent investigation into the controversial 2011 shooting of 18-year-old Tahiem Goffe by a Springfield policeman, which was investigated by the Springfield police and ruled justified by the local district attorney. Swan urged District Attorney Mark G. Mastroianni called to appoint a special prosecutor to investigate the incident, "to ensure that proper police procedures were employed and that the investigation will not be compromised." Swan argued the need for independent investigators in any cases involving a shooting by a police office. He noted that historically, the office of District Attorney has not been an effective instrument for insuring transparency. Swan has called for police accountability and the implementation of civilian police oversight.

Swan weighed in on several high-profile cases involving police shootings. After George Zimmerman was acquitted of the murder of 17 year old Trayvon Martin, Swan helped to organize the 'Justice for Trayvon Martin' rally, part of a 100-city vigil that was held across the country. Swan met with Massachusetts legislators to rally opposition to 'Stand Your Ground' legislation in the House of Representatives. Swan noted that we "should be encouraging non-violence and the de-escalation of conflicts when a safe retreat can be made." The legislation was not passed.

Swan is a former police chaplain for the Springfield Police Department. In 2005 he organized the Rev. Theodore N. Brown Anti Gang Initiative. The effort was named in honor of Rev. Theodore Brown, a school counselor who was murdered by 17 year old Corey Ramos. In honor of Brown, Swan wrote a book, Addressing Violence in Springfield Schools: We Cannot Allow the Death of Rev. Theodore N. Brown to be in Vain. The book presents Swan's analysis on school violence and several models of education. The anti-gang program trained street workers who frequented gang 'hot spots' trying to break through to young men and women involved in gangs, drugs, and violence or being drawn into such activity. Swan has worked with police departments and coordinated meetings at his church with witnesses to crimes in efforts to foster regular communication with law enforcement. Swan was appointed by Massachusetts attorney general Maura Healey to her Advisory Council on Racial Justice and Equity and by Springfield City Council President Orlando Ramos to the Committee on Police and Community Relations. Swan was appointed to a three-year term beginning in 2021 as a member of the Commission on the Status of African Americans, a commission created by the landmark Massachusetts Police Reform law.

In 2021, Swan called for the dismissal of Springfield Police Commissioner Cheryl Claprood after the results of a Department of Justice investigation revealed systemic abuse by police toward Black residents. Swan pushed for the federal government to force the police department to be accountable for its actions by calling for a consent decree from the U.S. Department of Justice. In 2022, the DOJ announced a consent decree mandating a series of reforms.

=== Voting rights ===
Swan was the lead plaintiff in a 1996 federal lawsuit against the city of Springfield seeking to declare the at large representation system unconstitutional on the grounds that it diluted the votes of African Americans, Latinos, and other communities of color. The lawsuit sought to change the all at-large election of the city council to one including ward representatives. It also sought an injunction against the current voting scheme. Referring to Springfield's at-large city council as a "bastion of privilege that systematically excludes residents from Springfield's poor and non-white neighborhoods," the Boston Globe brought national attention to Swan's efforts to replace the voting system in a featured article picturing Swan in front of his church.

A successful signature drive placed the question for ward representation on the November 1997 ballot. On election day, 58 percent of the voters were in favor of the question, which called for eight ward seats and three at-large seats. Although the ballot question received a majority vote, it fell short by 15,000 votes of the required number to become law. Swan, on behalf of the plaintiffs, offered to drop the lawsuit if city councilors agree to honor the will of the electorate and implement the ward system.

In January 1998 Mayor Michael Albano again filed legislation with the city council to change to a ward system but it twice rejected the proposal. Swan then contacted the U.S. Department of Justice who assigned an investigator to consider if voting rights laws were being violated. Swan also requested assistance from the department in the federal lawsuit, alleging that the at-large system "was adopted and is being maintained purposefully to dilute, minimize and cancel out the voting strengths of blacks and Latinos."

Eventually, Mayor Charles V. Ryan and City Councilor Jose Tosado proposed a home-rule amendment that would expand the council to thirteen members, including eight warda and five at-large seats. The home-rule petition was adopted by the City Council 7–2, and was later passed by the state Senate and House and signed by the governor. On election day, November 6, 2007, city residents voted 72% in favor of changing the all at large election of the City Council and School Committee to one including ward representation. On November 3, 2009, Springfield held its first ward elections in 50 years.

In October 2011, Swan joined with the Lawyers Committee for Civil Rights, the ACLU and City Councilor Zaida Luna to send an urgent request to the US Department of Justice for intervention in the City of Springfield regarding widespread voter rights violations. The group cited multiple incidents and areas of noncompliance with the Federal Voting Rights Act and the Department of Justice's 2006 settlement order with the City of Springfield. Teams from the US Department of Justice and the US attorney general's office arrived in Springfield on November 8, 2011.

In 2024, Swan was named the national chairperson of COGIC Counts, the voting initiative of the Church Of God In Christ. Swan was tasked with utilizing a variety of means to maximize voting participation among the denomination's congregants across the nation with a goal of registering everyone eligible in the denomination's churches to vote and mobilizing them to vote in the 2024 election.

=== Unresolved murders of Black women ===
Bishop Swan challenged the mayor and police department regarding the murders of four black women in the Western Massachusetts region. Media reports of the victims described them as drug users and police seemed to have no leads regarding their assailants. Swan and other activists accused the police department of not pursuing their cases as vigorously as other victims because they were poor and black. Under pressure from the community, Mayor Michael Albano authorized unlimited funds for overtime for police to solve the murders. Swan organized an effort to erect a stone monument honoring the life of the four victims and other women of color whose murders were unsolved. After receiving approval from the Springfield Parks Department, Swan was told that he would need to receive approval from the Springfield Historical Society to erect the monument in the triangle of Mason Square, an historically African American neighborhood where most of the victims lived, The Historical Society required Swan to get approval from the four surrounding neighborhood councils. Failing to get the approval of one of the councils, Swan's request was denied. Swan persisted regarding the placement of the monument and challenging the city regarding their investigation of the murders. Mayor Albano, using executive authority, allowed the monument to be erected outside the Springfield District Court and Alfred Gaynor was eventually arrested, convicted, and sentenced to four consecutive life sentences.

== Controversial views and remarks ==
=== Homosexuality ===
Swan is the editor of Closing the Closet: Testimonies of Deliverance from Homosexuality, a book published in 2004, which details the testimonies of 23 individuals, including Darryl L. Foster and Alan Chambers, who claim to no longer be homosexual as a result of their religious experience. Swan has also taken issue with the comparison of the fight to legalize same-sex marriage with the civil rights struggle. He has said "homosexuality is a chosen lifestyle" and Black people can "ride down the street and get profiled just because of [their] skin color, [which] is something a homosexual will never go through." After the Supreme Court ruling in Obergefell v. Hodges legalized same sex marriage across the United States, Swan held that gay struggles could not be compared to the history of the enslavement of blacks. Swan was quoted in 2015 as saying that he agreed "the church-run bakery down the street from his congregation should have the right to deny its services to a gay couple."

In November 2016, Swan signed onto a letter supporting religious freedom laws, which have been condemned by some as legalizing discrimination against LGBTQ people. The letter also condemns abortion saying "abortion in the black community has had a catastrophic impact" and condemned Democratic presidential nominee Hillary Clinton for her "unconscionable silence in the face of such destruction of innocent black life."

Sam Brownback, a Republican politician, and former U.S. Senator and Governor from Kansas, said that Swan is among a growing number of African American leaders speaking out and "working to prevent promoters of same-sex marriage from hijacking the civil rights movement." Peter Sprigg, author and Senior Fellow for Policy Studies at the evangelical activist group Family Research Council quoted Swan as stating that homosexuals will never face the kind of profiling African Americans face.

=== Racial views ===
In 2021, Tim Scott, an African American Republican, gave the Republican response to President Joe Biden's first address to Congress. In his speech, Scott stated that "America is not a racist country." Swan in a tweet responding to the speech referred to Scott as "Uncle Tim", a derivative of the racial slur Uncle Tom, and a "cunning white supremacist apologist."

Swan stated on Twitter in 2022 that "whiteness is an unrelenting, demonic force of evil." The tweet was condemned by some as demonizing and disparaging white people.

Following Nikki Haley declaring her candidacy for the Republican nomination for president in the 2024 U.S. presidential election, Swan tweeted "NIMRATA RANDHAWA HALEY Say your real name @NikkiHaley. Are you afraid the white folks you’re kowtowing to won’t vote for someone named Nimrata." However, PolitiFact called the claim that Haley "whitewashed" her name a "pants-on-fire" falsehood; Haley has gone by her middle name, Nikki, since she was a child.

During the Gaza war, Swan referred to Israel as a "white supremacist apartheid government" that is engaged in "murder, brutalization, and oppression of brown people in Gaza."

== Political activity ==
In 2006, Swan was one of several clergy that endorsed Deval Patrick for Governor of Massachusetts. After his victory as the first African-American governor in the history of the Commonwealth of Massachusetts, Patrick selected Swan as one of the speakers at the Interfaith Prayer Service preceding his Inaugural. Swan again endorsed Patrick in his 2010 bid for reelection and hosted Patrick at an Urban Town Hall Meeting at his church in Springfield. Swan was again selected to speak during the Interfaith Prayer Service preceding Patrick's second Inaugural.

In August 2012, Swan met with Elizabeth Warren in a closed session with other clergy hosted at his church. Swan noted that clergy had a responsibility to meet with candidates to "ascertain their veracity, political competence, ability to effectively manage crises and inspire confidence through outstanding leadership and their ability to produce tangible results that serve the needs of our constituents." Taking issue with her opponent Scott Brown's heavy focus on calling her Native American heritage into question, Swan announced his support for Warren. Swan's meeting with Warren also garnered support for her by other prominent clergy.

Upon U.S. senator John Kerry's confirmation as Secretary of State under the administration of President Barack Obama, Ed Markey sought Swan's support in his bid to win the vacated senate seat. Swan organized a meeting between Markey and area clergy and noted that the meeting was "substantive and informative." Swan played a similar role in vetting the positions of candidates for Hampden County District Attorney and Hampden County Sheriff. During the 2016 presidential election, Swan reportedly joined more than two dozen national black leaders in challenging Democratic presidential nominee Hillary Clinton's stance on issues related to so-called "religious freedom."

Swan was a speaker at the Massachusetts sister march to the People's Climate Movement march held in Washington DC in 2017. He said that climate justice and racial justice are closely related and that the most vulnerable and maligned populations get hit hardest by climate change. He was a speaker at the 60th anniversary of the March on Washington

Swan was appointed to the Massachusetts Hate Crimes Task Force by Governor Charlie Baker in 2022. The task force focuses on hate crimes and has a wide-ranging mission including tracking the prevalence of the crimes, examining ways to prevent them and supporting victims of hate crimes. It also works with law enforcement to improve the investigation and prosecution of hate crimes.

Bishop Swan was elected chair of the Massachusetts Commission on the Status of African American, which is charged with making policy recommendations based on research and analysis to the general court and executive agencies to ensure African Americans equitably benefit from and have access to government services and amend policies that have excluded African Americans.

=== Honors and recognition ===
Bishop Swan has received numerous awards lauding him for his work civil rights advocacy and race relations. For example, he was awarded the Social Justice Award for Race Relations by Martin Luther King, Jr. Family Services. He is the recipient of the prestigious Civil Rights Advocacy Award by the National Action Network, a civil rights organization founded by Rev. Al Sharpton He received the NAACP James F. Hennessey Award for his work in civil rights advocacy. Bishop Swan is also a recipient of the Ruth B. Loving Social Justice Activist Legacy Award.

On September 7, 2024, the city of Springfield, Swan's hometown, held a street naming ceremony in his honor, designating Alden Street, where his church, Spring of Hope Church of God in Christ, is located, as "Bishop Talbert Swan Way." Speakers at the event included: Springfield mayor Domenic Sarno, State Representative Bud L. Williams, City Councilor Lavar Click Bruce, and State Senator Adam Gomez. Swan noted that he was honored to be recognized by the city of his birth on the street that has been the headquarters of his family's activism for over four decades.

On October 2, 2025, Bishop Swan was inducted into the Martin Luther King Jr. Board of Preachers at Morehouse College. The historic induction ceremony, held in Atlanta, honors distinguished clergy and lay leaders who "reflect the prophetic witness, moral courage, and unwavering commitment to justice" which the college promotes. Swan issued a statement that said it is a profound honor to be inducted since Dr. King’s life and message shaped his ministry and activism.

=== Twitter suspension ===
Swan's Twitter account was suspended in August 2018 for what Twitter termed "hateful conduct." Swan believes the suspension was for a May tweet in which he used the term "coon" in reference to Black conservative Candace Owens. After two weeks, Swan's account was reinstated by Twitter.

Church of God in Christ Titles
Preceded by Bishop Loran Mann	Bishop of Vermont; 2021–Present	Succeeded by Incumbent
Preceded by Bishop Roderick Wilson	Bishop of Nova Scotia; 2016–2021	Succeeded by Bishop Joe Wilkins
