= WBBP =

Memphis, Tennessee; United States
- Broadcast area: Memphis metropolitan area
- Frequency: 1480 kHz

Programming
- Language: English
- Format: Gospel music

Ownership
- Owner: Bountiful Blessings; (Bountiful Blessing, Inc.)

History
- First air date: November 1951
- Former call signs: WFAK (1951–1952); WCBR (1952–1956); WLOK (1956–1964); WMQM (1964–1991) (Note: The station was listed in the FCC database as WNNP for one day in 1994, likely in error.)
- Call sign meaning: "Where Bible Believers Praise God"

Technical information
- Licensing authority: FCC
- Facility ID: 6542
- Class: D
- Power: 5,000 watts (day); 41 watts (night)
- Transmitter coordinates: 35°03′19″N 90°05′16″W

Links
- Public license information: Public file; LMS
- Webcast: Listen live
- Website: wbbp.org

WBBP (1480 AM) is a non-commercial radio station licensed to Memphis, Tennessee, featuring a gospel format. Owned by Bountiful Blessings, an extension of the Temple of Deliverance Church of God in Christ, the station serves the Memphis metropolitan area. WBBP's studios are located at the Temple of Deliverance's headquarters in Memphis, while the transmitter is located in the city's southeastern side. In addition to a standard analog transmission, WBBP is available online.

== History ==
=== WFAK and WCBR ===
Frank J. Keegan applied on April 21, 1950, for a construction permit to build a daytime-only radio station in Memphis, originally on 1570 kHz but changed to 1480 later in the year, operating with 1,000 watts. The Federal Communications Commission (FCC) approved the application on March 14, 1951, and WFAK began test broadcasts in November from studios at 215 Madison Street and a transmitter across the Mississippi River in Crittenden County, Arkansas, near the Harahan Bridge. When the license was officially awarded on November 19, WFAK began its programming of "good music".

In July 1952, to finance a possible expansion to 5,000 watts daytime and a television station application, Keegan announced plans to form a corporation and issue shares. Those plans were dropped, and in late 1952, Keegan sold the station to the Chickasaw Broadcasting Corporation. This company featured professional golfer Cary Middlecoff as well as several other investors in the brewing, advertising, and radio industries. After the FCC objected to a plan in which part of the purchase price was to be a percentage of profits, a flat fee of $57,500 was agreed, and the commission signed off on the deal in December. The studios were immediately moved to the top floor of the Exchange Building and the call sign changed to WCBR.

On June 18, 1954, to attract advertisers, Chickasaw overhauled WCBR's programming and converted it to being the second radio station to serve the Black community in Memphis after WDIA; Cleophus Robinson was part of the new WCBR's first air staff. The transmitter was relocated to a site on McLemore Avenue in Memphis and studios to 378 Beale Street.

=== WLOK ===
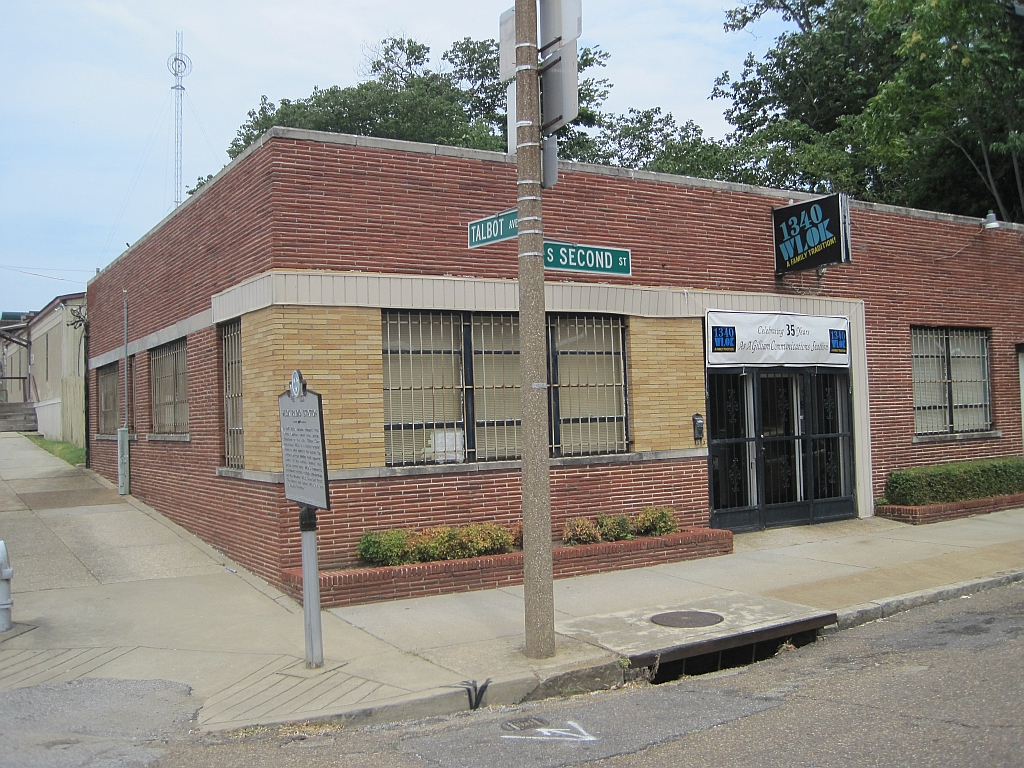
In 1959, WLOK moved into these studios on Second Street, still utilized today by WLOK at 1340 AM

In January 1956, the stockholders of Chickasaw Broadcasting filed to transfer the firm to Jules J. Paglin and Stanley W. Ray, Jr., of New Orleans. The FCC approved a month later, and the call sign was changed to WLOK on April 1, 1956, to take its place alongside Paglin and Ray's other OK Group stations, which like the new WLOK broadcast programs for Black listeners.

The new owners raised the station's daytime power to its present 5,000 watts in December 1956; at that time, station management boasted that WLOK was the only local station with an all-Black group of announcers and performers. Two years later, the OK Group purchased a building at 363 South Second Street, once built for the Tennessee Trust Company, to house an "efficient" one-story studio complex for the station, moving off of Beale Street.

In June 1963, the OK Group filed to purchase the silent WHHM (1340 AM) for $135,000. WHHM had gone off the air amidst financial difficulties at the end of 1962, being placed into bankruptcy. While WHHM's transmitter site had been condemned for highway construction, and WHHM's daytime power was just 1,000 watts, the silent station had something WLOK at 1480 did not: the ability to broadcast at night. OK Group would move WLOK's call letters and programming to 1340 kHz while spinning off the 1480 kHz license, which was necessary because of regulatory limits of the day.

=== WMQM ===
On December 31, 1963, the FCC granted an application to transfer the license and to relocate the 1340 transmitter to the existing WLOK site at 1386 South McLemore Avenue. As part of the sale, the 1480 facility was sold to Century Broadcasting of Fort Worth, Texas. Century Broadcasting spent the first several months of 1964 preparing to go on the air with its station, WMQM (Memphis Quality Music). On April 11, 1964, WLOK and its programming moved from 1480 to 1340 kHz, and WMQM went on air from studios in the Chisca Hotel that had previously been used by WHBQ.

The "quality music" middle-of-the-road sound disappeared on July 1, 1966, when WMQM flipped to a contemporary country format, termed "countrypolitan". The station organized more than two dozen country music concerts between 1966 and 1972, promoted by Carlton Haney, with such headliners as Johnny Cash, Conway Twitty, Porter Wagoner, and others. The country sound continued for more than a decade, though the 1973 flip of the high-power, 24-hour WMC to country signaled the beginning of the end for country at 1480 and immediately dented WMQM's ratings. 1973 also saw the station move to its present transmitter site on Mitchell Road, southwest of Memphis.

WMQM was sold by Century, which had renamed itself Dalworth Broadcasting, to the F.W. Robbert Broadcasting Company of New Orleans in 1977 for $550,000. Robbert changed the station to a Christian radio format, which by 1982 consisted of sacred music and brokered programming. At this time, the station was also airing the first two Spanish-language Christian radio programs in the Memphis area.

=== WBBP ===
In 1990, Robbert Broadcasting sold WMQM for $462,000 to Bountiful Blessings, Inc. The company, associated with the Temple of Deliverance Church of God in Christ, changed the call letters to WBBP in February 1991, beginning 24-hour broadcasting and replacing WMQM's mostly paid programming with a gospel format. WBBP's flip to gospel gave Memphis five stations in the format, more than in Chicago. Temple of Deliverance pastor Gilbert E. Patterson served as the station's president and general manager.
