= John Drew Sheard Sr. =

Presiding Bishop of the Church of God in Christ

His Grace the Most Reverend John Drew Sheard Sr.
- Presiding Bishop, Church of God in Christ
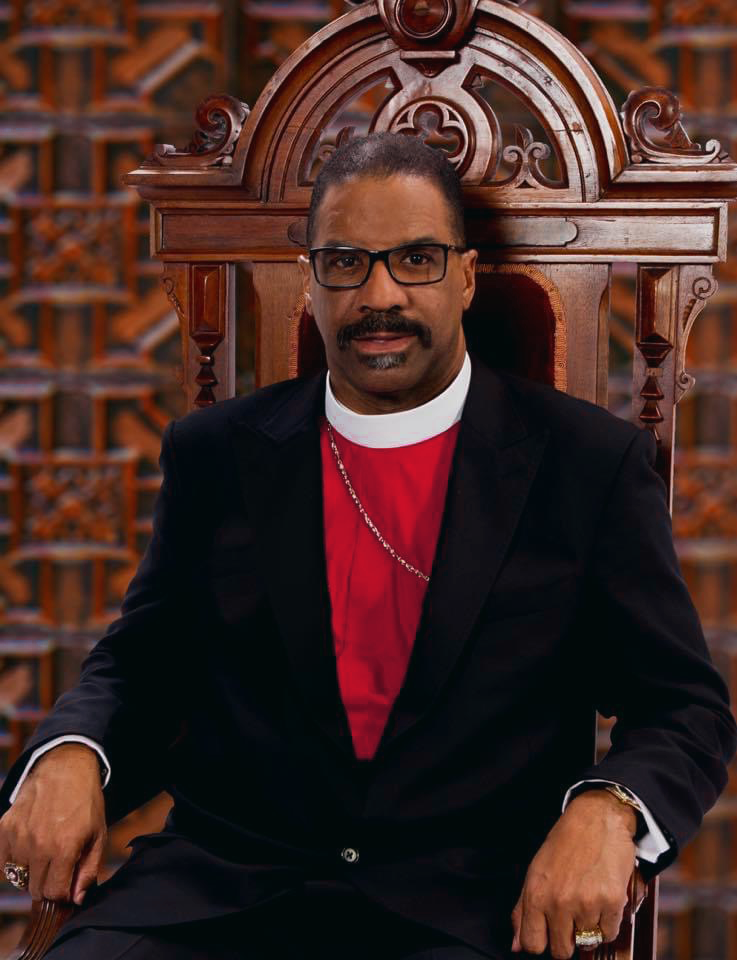
- Official portrait, 2021
- Church: Church of God in Christ, Global
- Diocese: Michigan North Central Jurisdiction
- Elected: 2012–present (as General Board member); 2021–present (as Presiding Bishop)
- Predecessor: Charles Edward Blake, Sr.
- Previous post: Chairman, COGIC International AIM Convention (2004–2012)

Orders
- Ordination: 1988 (as pastor of Greater Emmanuel Institutional COGIC)
- Consecration: 2010 (as Bishop of the Michigan North Central Jurisdiction); 2012 (as a member of the COGIC General Board) by: Willie L. Harris (as pastor & elder); Charles E. Blake Sr. (as bishop)

Personal details
- Born: John Drew Sheard; January 1, 1959 (age 67) Detroit, Michigan, U.S.
- Residence: Detroit, Michigan, U.S.
- Spouse: Karen Clark Sheard (m. 1984)
- Children: 2, including Kierra Sheard
- Education: Wayne State University

John Drew Sheard Sr. (born January 1, 1959) is an American pastor and minister from Detroit, Michigan, who is the current presiding bishop of the Church of God in Christ, a six million-member predominantly African-American Holiness Pentecostal denomination that has now grown to become one of the largest African-American Pentecostal denominations in the United States.

Sheard was elected as the leader of the denomination in its first ever all-virtual online election, that was held virtually online due to the COVID-19 pandemic on March 20, 2021. He is the first COGIC presiding bishop from Michigan and is the pastor of the Greater Emmanuel Institutional Church of God in Christ, one of the denomination's largest churches in Michigan. He also previously served as a member of the General Board, the twelve bishops who make up the national COGIC Board of directors, and as the president of the COGIC International Youth Department, the auxiliary ministry department of the denomination focused on youth and young adults, from 1997 to 2001. He was the International President and Chairman of the COGIC Auxiliaries In Ministry convention from 2004 to 2012.

== Early life ==
J. Drew Sheard was born on January 1, 1959, to Bishop John Henry Sheard and Willie Mae Sheard in Detroit, Michigan. He was raised as a Pentecostal Christian in the Church of God in Christ with his younger brother, Ethan Blake Sheard, who is also a pastor and bishop in the COGIC denomination. Upon graduating high school, he attended the Wayne State University, where he earned a Bachelor of Science degree in education, and a Master of Education degree in mathematics, and while balancing a career in Christian ministry as a clergyman, he also worked as a secondary school math teacher in the Detroit Public Schools District.

In 1984, he married Karen Clark Sheard, a gospel singer and member of the famed gospel vocal group the Clark Sisters. Her mother, noted gospel choir director Mattie Moss Clark, served as the international music department president of COGIC. For several years, he helped Mattie Moss Clark manage the Clark Sisters' singing career throughout the 1980s until they parted to focus on their own individual careers. From then on, he became his wife Karen's manager.

== Ministerial career ==
Throughout the 1980s and 1990s, Bishop Sheard served in various capacities with the COGIC denomination under the tutelage of his father, Bishop John H. Sheard, including as a choir director, chairman of both local and state youth departments in the COGIC denomination, as a national adjutant overseer, and eventually as an executive secretary of the International Youth Department for the COGIC denomination. He also served in various civic capacities including executive director of the Michigan Chapter of the Southern Christian Leadership Conference, and as a board member of the Michigan Anti-Apartheid Council.

in 1988, he became the senior pastor of the Greater Emmanuel Institutional COGIC in Detroit, Michigan, which at first started out as a very small all-African-American church parish in Detroit. He was appointed to this pastorate by Bishop H.J. Williams Sr., the first jurisdictional bishop of the North Central Jurisdiction of Michigan. Throughout the 1990s and 2000s, the church grew to become what is now one of the largest and fastest growing COGIC churches in Michigan, and although it is still predominantly African-American in membership, the church has also become a very widely multi-ethnic Pentecostal church as well in recent years.

In 2008, Sheard received an honorary Doctorate of Divinity degree, and in 2007 was inducted into the Morehouse College Martin Luther King Jr. Board of Preachers. In 2009, Sheard and his wife, Karen, founded Karew Records, a Detroit-based Christian music record label focusing on various forms of gospel and inspirational music.

In 1996, he was appointed by the late Presiding Bishop Chandler David Owens, as the international president of the Youth Department, He served from 1996 to 2000. In 2001, he was appointed by the late Presiding Bishop Gilbert Earl Patterson as vice chairman of the Auxiliaries in Ministry (AIM) Department. He served until 2004. In 2004, he was appointed as the chairman of AIM by the late Presiding Bishop G.E. Patterson. He served until 2012, until he was succeeded by Bishop Linwood Dillard of Memphis, Tennessee. In 2009, he was ratified and approved by the COGIC General Assembly to become the jurisdictional bishop of the Michigan North Central Jurisdiction diocese of the Church of God in Christ. This was at the recommendation and urging of Bishop Williams who was ready to retire. In 2012, he was elected to the General Board, the twelve bishops who serve as the Board of Directors of the church, where he served two four year terms from 2012 to 2016, and 2016 to 2020 respectively.

The scheduled election for the denomination in 2020 was canceled due to the COVID-19 pandemic, and was rescheduled as an all-virtual online election for March 2021, and on March 20, 2021, subsequently after being re-elected to the General Board of the church, the church had a run-off election between him and Bishop Jerry W. Macklin, of Hayward, California, for the office of presiding bishop. He won against Bishop Macklin in the run-off election and became the presiding bishop of the Church of God in Christ worldwide, and then subsequently appointed Bishop Macklin as his first assistant presiding bishop, and Bishop Lawrence M. Wooten of St. Louis, Missouri as his second assistant presiding bishop.

He was officially inaugurated and installed as the presiding bishop of the COGIC on June 22, 2021.

In 2020, he was portrayed by actor Michael Xavier in the Lifetime biographical film, The Clark Sisters: First Ladies of Gospel, a biopic produced by Mary J. Blige and Queen Latifah, about his wife and sisters-in-law, chronicling their careers as a gospel group.

=== Presiding bishop ===
In his first year as presiding bishop in 2021, in order to combat debt that the church had accrued from previous years, Sheard helped to launch the I Love My Church initiative, which was a fundraising campaign that helped the COGIC denomination to pay off much of its debts, renovate and refurbish its headquarters church, Mason Temple (named after the COGIC's founder, Bishop Charles H. Mason), establish housing complexes for low-income families throughout Shelby County, Tennessee, near the church's headquarters, and purchased a former Catholic nunnery convent in Memphis to provide housing for single mothers affected by health challenges, disabilities, teen pregnancies, and domestic violence.

He also launched several new Christian ministry programs in the COGIC church between 2021 and 2022 through the C.E. Blake Ministry Initiatives (formerly the Urban Initiatives program; the church renamed the ministry program in honor of Presiding Bishop Emeritus Charles E. Blake), to help local church ministries and jurisdictions find effective ways to combat social and racial injustices that affect Black people and people of color; ministry programs focused on effectively teaching COGIC laymembers sound biblical Christian doctrine and on seeking how to be filled with the baptism of the Holy Spirit and that places greater emphasis on evangelism, holiness teaching, and Gospel preaching through Bible study and Sunday school; establishing ministry programs to help COGIC pastors and ministers to acquire affordable formal education from interdenominational and ecumenical Christian religious seminaries; and Bishop Sheard has also helped to establish ministry programs to help local churches and jurisdictions address issues with abortion and teen pregnancy among Black people and people of color, and members of COGIC as well.

Bishop Sheard is also credited with helping to expand the ministry programs started by his predecessor, Bishop Charles E. Blake, that serves to provide benevolent benefits and aid to the elderly widows and widowers of deceased former COGIC leaders and members as well.

== Personal life ==
=== Marriage and family ===
Sheard is married to Karen Clark-Sheard, a Grammy Award-winning gospel singer and member of the gospel vocalist group the Clark Sisters. Together they have two children: Kierra "Kiki" Sheard-Kelly (born 1987) and John Drew "J. Drew" Sheard, II (Jr.) (born 1989) and three grandchildren. Another pregnancy ended in a stillbirth. Kierra Sheard is also a gospel recording artist, with four albums, plus various projects to her credit. J. Drew, II is a musician and producer who often plays the drums and piano for the Clark Sisters, and other gospel singers and groups. In 2001, his wife Karen Clark-Sheard was faced with a life-threatening crisis when a blood vessel burst during a scheduled bariatric surgery. Her doctors only gave her a 2% chance of survival due to her complications. After the blood clot was surgically removed, Clark-Sheard fell into a coma. The coma lasted three and a half weeks, but Clark-Sheard says she made a miraculous recovery, which Bishop Sheard attributed to prayer and to "God's grace and healing power."

His father, John Henry Sheard, was the chairman of the Board of Bishops of the COGIC denomination until his death. The Board of Bishops comprises all COGIC bishops and assists the General Board in matters referred to it by the General Board. His mother and father both contracted COVID-19 in 2020, and his mother, Willie Mae Sheard, died from it in April 2020. His father survived his bout with the virus and recovered from it a few months later. His father later died on November 11, 2021, where Bishop Sheard confirmed his death from infection on Instagram. His brother, Ethan Blake Sheard, is also a COGIC pastor and bishop. In addition, he was the son-in-law of Mattie Moss Clark, a former international president of the COGIC Music Department who served as head director of the international COGIC C. H. Mason Memorial Choir—the gospel choir that serves the COGIC denomination's music ministry at its international conventions and conferences.

== See also ==
- List of jurisdictions of the Church of God in Christ
