= Temple of Deliverance Church of God in Christ =

COGIC megachurch in Memphis, Tennessee, United States

- Temple of Deliverance Cathedral of Bountiful Blessings
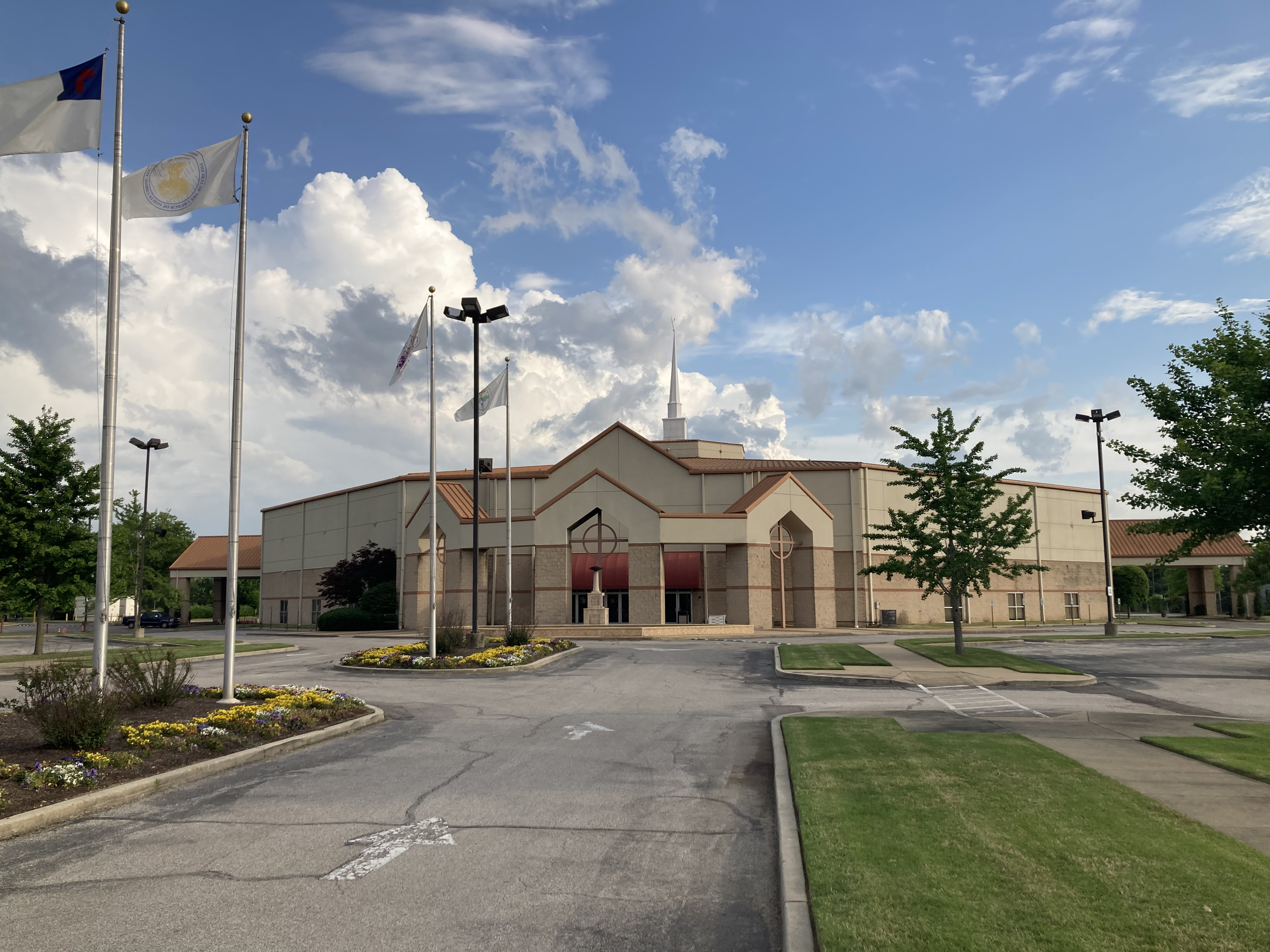
- Temple of Deliverance Church of God in Christ, pictured in 2025, is one of the largest COGIC churches.
- Temple of Deliverance Church of God in Christ
- Country: United States
- Denomination: Church of God in Christ
- Website: todcogic.org

History
- Founded: March 6, 1975
- Founder: Bishop G.E. Patterson

Temple of Deliverance Church of God in Christ is a Pentecostal church located in Memphis, Tennessee. It was founded March 6, 1975, by the late Bishop Gilbert E. Patterson. The church's current pastor is Bishop Milton Hawkins. The Temple of Deliverance Church of God in Christ is one of the largest churches in the city of Memphis and the Church of God in Christ denomination.

== History ==
G. E. Patterson founded the Temple of Deliverance Church of God in Christ as the Bountiful Blessings Temple of Deliverance in 1975. The Church became affiliated with the Church of God in Christ in 1988.

Gilbert Earl Patterson was born September 22, 1939, in the parsonage next door to the Church of God in Christ in Humboldt, Tennessee. He was the son of the late Bishop William Archie Patterson Sr. and Mary Louise Patterson. He was the brother of the late Elder William Archie Patterson Jr., Evangelist Mary Alice Patterson Hawkins, Supervisor Lee Ella Patterson Smith, and Evangelist Barbara Patterson Davis. He became a Christian in May 1951 at age 11 at Holy Temple Church of God in Christ in Memphis, where his father was the pastor. At that time, a revival was being held by Elder Johnny Brown.

In May 1952, the Patterson family moved to Detroit, Michigan. While in Detroit, at age 16 Patterson received the baptism in the Holy Ghost on September 16, 1956, at his father’s church (New Jerusalem Church of God in Christ). One month later young Patterson also felt called to the ministry, and he preached his first sermon on January 22, 1957. The sermon text was Isaiah 59:9; his subject was “We Wait For Light, But We Walk In Darkness”. He was licensed by his father in March 1957, and ordained by Bishop J. S. Bailey on August 28, 1958.

In Detroit Patterson graduated from Hutchins Intermediate and Central High School, and attended the Detroit Bible Institute. As a teenager Patterson was a choir member, lead singer in the New Jerusalem Ensemble and a part-time national evangelist. While still a teenager, he spoke at the National Holy Convocation of the Church of God in Christ and the International Youth Congress. On two occasions, he preached before Bishop C. H. Mason.

In December 1961 Patterson returned to Memphis as co-pastor of Holy Temple Church of God in Christ, and to attend LeMoyne College. At that time, Holy Temple had 80 adult members and only a few children. From December 1961 to June 1964, Holy Temple experienced no growth. However, in June Patterson led the congregation in three days and nights of abstinence, fasting and prayer. This was followed in July with a 30-day tent revival, held two blocks from the church. During the revival, 55 new members were added to the church. In 1965, Patterson became known as "God’s young apostle" because of his ability to gather large crowds. At that time, he also planned to establish missions and organize churches. He continued as co-pastor of Holy Temple, and the church grew between July 1964 and December 1974.

In 1969, following the death of Tennessee Bishop A. B. McEwen Sr., a rift began in the Patterson family. Many pastors in western Tennessee wanted Patterson’s father to return from Detroit to full-time service in Memphis as the bishop of West Tennessee. Presiding Bishop J. O. Patterson refused, using the Catholic Church as his example. He felt that the Presiding Bishop of the Church of God in Christ should be the bishop of Memphis, as the Pope is bishop of Rome. Gilbert Patterson attempted to champion his father's cause, but failed. During the Convocation of 1974 the General Board supported the Presiding Bishop, and prepared to move against Bishop W. A. Patterson, Sr. and his son to remove them from Holy Temple. In an effort to end the feud and any further efforts against his father, Gilbert Patterson resigned from Holy Temple effective February 23, 1975.

In the meantime Gilbert Patterson purchased and remodeled the Mt. Vernon Baptist Church on Mississippi Boulevard, and opened Temple of Deliverance, the Cathedral of Bountiful Blessings, on March 2, 1975. On that day, 436 people joined the church from every denomination and religious organization in Memphis. The congregation outgrew the church almost immediately. In less than three years church membership grew to over 2,000, and immediate plans were made to build a larger place of worship. On October 8, 1978 (three years and seven months after its opening), the Temple of Deliverance entered its new building. At a cost of $1.2 million, it was the first church built by African Americans in Memphis at a cost more than a million dollars. By 1984, the 1,200-seat sanctuary could no longer accommodate the 11:00 am worshippers. After filling chairs in the aisles the crowd frequently overflowed into the fellowship hall downstairs, where the worship could be viewed on a closed-circuit television screen. On July 5, 1987, Bishop C. D. Owens dedicated a new wing, seating approximately 600.

In September 1986, during a telephone conversation with his uncle, Presiding Bishop J. O. Patterson expressed a desire to see his nephew return to active membership in the Church of God in Christ. As a result of that conversation, the Presiding Bishop had Gilbert Patterson’s name added to the General Board’s agenda for the Convocation of 1986. Many board members had waited for this day, hoping for Patterson’s return. Board members such as O. T. Jones Jr., F. D. Washington, J. D. Husband, LeRoy Anderson and C. D. Owens were supporters; the most vocal was Patterson’s lifelong friend, Bishop Chandler D. Owens (who had not yielded to pressure to break ties with Patterson). During the November 1986 General Board meeting, the board voted 11–0 to invite Patterson to return to active ministry in the Church of God in Christ as a Jurisdictional Bishop in Memphis. The meeting was chaired by Bishop L.H. Ford, in the presiding bishop's absence. Therefore, the general board's November 1986 action was not executed by Bishop J. O. Patterson Sr. until January 29, 1988, at the Bishops' Conference in Jacksonville, Florida.

Bishop G. E. Patterson was elected to the General Board in 1992, and reelected in 1996. After conceding the last election for Presiding Bishop (which he lost by one vote), he was elected on November 14, 2000, by more than 900 votes. In 2005, Patterson announced that he was battling prostate cancer. Patterson died on March 20, 2007, at Methodist University Hospital in Memphis.

== Ministerial design ==
Bountiful Blessing Television Broadcasts

It is the home church of the former Presiding Bishop of the Church of God in Christ. Its services are carried out on satellite by Black Entertainment Television, Trinity Broadcast Network and The Word Network. The church also owns radio station WBBP (1480 kHz) and Podium Records.
