= Darryl Foster =

American activist and Christian minister

DL Foster
- Born: September 25, 1961 (age 64); Cameron, Texas, U.S.
- Occupations: Preacher, Minister
- Years active: 1991 - Present
- Known for: Ex-gay movement
- Website: http://www.witnessfortheworld.org/

Darryl L. Foster is an American activist, author and Christian minister. He began his ministry in the Church of God in Christ (COGIC), the largest African American Pentecostal Christian denomination in the world. An advocate of sexual holiness, he founded, and is executive director of Witness Freedom Ministries, which provides biblical direction to men and women seeking to change their sexual orientation and refrain from same-sex relationships.

== Biography ==
=== Early life ===
Foster was born into a family of Church of God in Christ preachers. His father was a pastor in the denomination, as was his grandfather, Ezekiel Foster Sr., whom he acknowledges as a major influence in his life. Foster was raised in Marlin, Texas, until his graduation where he enlisted in military service in 1982.

=== Education ===
After graduating from Marlin High School in 1980, Foster enrolled in McClennan Community College at Waco to study journalism and mass communications in hopes of landing a career as a media writer. While there, he served as the News Editor for the school's official paper, The Highland Herald. After a spending a decade in military service, Foster begin pursuing theology and enrolled in Liberty University's External Degree Program. He completed a course in "Faith Writing" offered by Baylor University and taught by writer William Mattox Jr. Later, he studied theology at Atlanta Bible College, but withdrew after a year because of doctrinal concerns with the school's denominational affiliation.

== Military service ==
Foster served in various infantry and combat support units at Fort Campbell, KY, Fort Benning, GA, and 3rd Armored Division, Germany. He served in Operation Big Pine II in Honduras, 1983 and served as a US Chief of Staff driver during a year's tour with the Multinational Force and Observers (MFO) in El Gorah Egypt from 1984 to 1985. In August 1991, his Fort Benning-based unit deployed to Operation Desert Storm. Foster was the recipient of numerous service medals and honors including the Army Achievement Medal (2nd OLC), the Joint Service Commendation Medal and the rare Kuwait Liberation Medal presented by the Kingdom of Saudi Arabia. Foster was honorably discharged in May 1992.

== Ministry ==
In his public testimonies, Foster has described himself as living as a gay man, until becoming a born-again Christian in 1990. The following year, he became a licensed minister in COGIC. He eventually "came out" as having lived as a homosexual male in the past, publicizing his testimony in the denomination, on a public-access cable channel in Waco, Texas. He gained national prominence when the Christian magazine Charisma featured him in the 1998 cover story entitled "Let's Stop Hiding From the Pain".

He founded Witness Freedom Ministries in Waco in 1996 and began developing programs to reach and assist Christian men and women with their personal struggles with sexuality. A conference was launched in 1998, and in 1999 Foster relocated the ministry to Atlanta, Georgia with a specific focus on people of color.

In 1998, he became associated with the ex-gay movement Exodus International. He became one of the few prominent African American leaders in the ex-gay movement. Foster and other leaders of the movement defend their outreaches as part of the church's mission to provide help to people who "struggle" with homosexuality.

He founded the Restoration Sanctuary Church in Forest Park, Georgia, where he served as pastor from 2001 to 2008. The church was later renamed Praise Power Ministries.

=== Activism ===
In June 2007, Foster launched Gay Christian Movement Watch, a controversial blog which began calling attention to the "gay christian movement".

In September 2009, Foster launched Report COGIC Abuse, a second website which called attention to cases of clergy sexual abuse in his former denomination. Foster contended the church's leadership was turning a blind eye to the sexual abuse of children. The site stirred considerable resistance from leaders of the denomination, including Bishop Charles Blake, the church's Presiding Bishop. Blake told the Memphis Commercial Appeal, ""Brother Foster has a flavor of the year he usually focuses on. His flavor this year is sexual harassment and sexual abuse."

Blake said the attention the site has received is out of proportion, considering the thousands of COGIC leaders. "Thirty allegations of sexual misbehavior is too many, but it should be looked at in that context," he said.

== Writings ==
Foster chronicled his 11 years of homosexual experiences in the semiautobiographical Touching A Dead Man: One Man's Explosive Story of Deliverance from Homosexuality, published in 2002.
