= List of jurisdictions of the Church of God in Christ =

The Church of God in Christ (COGIC) is a Holiness-Pentecostal Christian denomination, with a predominantly African-American membership. The denomination reports having more than 12,000 churches and over 6.5 million members in the United States. The National Council of Churches ranks it as the fifth largest Christian denomination in the U.S.

Internationally, COGIC can be found in more than 100 nations. Its worldwide membership is estimated to be between six and eight million, composing more than 25,000 congregations throughout the world. The following is a list of the geographical dioceses of the denomination, which are called "jurisdictions", and the leader of each.*

*TBD = To Be Determined – when the Office of Bishop is vacant for a diocese/jurisdiction in the case of the death, retirement, or abdication of a bishop, or if the jurisdiction is newly formed and has no bishop yet.

*Bishop-designate = A "Bishop-designate" or "Bishop;;-designee" is someone selected to be a candidate for the Office of Bishop for a specific jurisdiction in the denomination, but has not yet been officially consecrated and installed in the position.

*Interim = This denotes that another bishop has been chosen from elsewhere in the denomination to be the temporary leader of a jurisdiction until a new Bishop-designate is officially consecrated and installed as its leader.

== North America ==
Updated as of July 17, 2026

=== Canada ===
- Nova Scotia Jurisdiction – Bishop Joe O. Wilkins, Sr.
- Canada/Michigan Jurisdiction – Bishop Percy W. Henderson II
- British Columbia/Vancouver – Bishop Benjamin Stephens III
- Ontario Jurisdiction – Bishop W. Aaron Robbins, Sr.

=== Mexico ===
- Mexico Jurisdiction – Bishop Juan Tomas Reyes

=== Panama ===
- Panama Jurisdiction – Bishop Eusebio Carlos Stewart

=== United States ===
==== Alabama ====
- Alabama First Jurisdiction – Bishop Oscar L. Meadows
- Alabama Second Jurisdiction – Bishop Marcus Earl Pulliam, Sr.
- Alabama Third Jurisdiction – Bishop Daniel E. Everson

==== Alaska ====
- Alaska Jurisdiction — Bishop Otis McCormick

==== Arizona ====
- Arizona Jurisdiction – Bishop Harvey T. Young, Sr.

==== Arkansas ====
- Arkansas First Jurisdiction – Bishop Jewel R. Withers, Jr.
- Arkansas Second Jurisdiction – Bishop Frank J. Anderson, Jr.
- Arkansas Third Jurisdiction – Bishop Michael A. Jones
- Arkansas Fourth Jurisdiction – Bishop Junius Earl Williams

==== California ====
- California New Journey – Bishop John Mark Richardson, Sr.
- California North Central – Bishop Donald Ray Murray, Chairman, Board of Bishops
- California Northwest – Bishop Nathaniel Bullock
- California Greater Northern Second – Bishop Johnathan Douglas Logan, Sr.
- California Nor Cal Metropolitan – Bishop Jerry Wayne Macklin, First Assistant Presiding Bishop, General Board Member
- California Northern First – Bishop Albert Galbraith Jr.
- California Northeast – Bishop Michael Julian Johnson
- California Southern First Jurisdiction – Bishop Joe Louis Ealy
- California Southern Evangelistic – Bishop Christopher Edwin Milton
- California Southern Second – Bishop Charles Glenn Nauden
- California Southern Third – Bishop Roger Thomas
- California Southern Fourth – Bishop Roy Dixon
- California Southern Metropolitan – Bishop Robert E. Peters, Sr.
- California Southwest – Bishop Hillrie Murphy
- California West Coast – Bishop Bob Jackson
- California Western – Bishop Leo Smith
- California Valley – Bishop Bruce E. McAlister

==== Colorado ====
- Colorado Jurisdiction – Bishop Wayne H. McDonald

==== Connecticut ====
- Connecticut First Jurisdiction – Bishop Charles H. Brewer III., Vice Chairman, International Men's Ministry
- Connecticut Second Jurisdiction – Bishop Augustus D. Pullen

==== Delaware ====
- Delaware Jurisdiction – Bishop Thomas Lee Holsey (Deceased As of August 20, 2026)

==== District of Columbia ====
- Washington, D.C. Jurisdiction — Bishop William E. McMillan, Jr.

==== Florida ====
- Florida Central First Jurisdiction – Bishop Gary L. Hall, Sr.
- Florida Central Second Jurisdiction – Bishop Edward Robinson, Sr.
- Florida Eastern – Bishop Michael E. Hill, Sr. (Interim)
- Florida Northwest – Bishop Willie C. Green
- Florida Southern – Bishop Marc Cooper
- Florida Southwest – Bishop Anthony W. Gilyard
- Florida Western – Bishop Willie J. Matheney
- Florida Western Second – Bishop Larry Perkins

==== Georgia ====
- Georgia North Central – Bishop Joseph E. Hogan, Sr.
- Georgia Northern First – Bishop Leonard J. Chapple, Sr.
- Georgia Northern Second – Bishop Mark Walden
- Georgia South Central – Bishop Norman O. Harper
- Georgia Southeast – Bishop Benjamin P. Collins
- Georgia Southern First – Bishop Larry L. Shaw
- Georgia Southern Second – Bishop Ronald B. Engram
- Georgia Western – Bishop Roy G. Primus, Sr.
- Georgia Metro – Bishop Michael J. Paden, Sr.

==== Hawaii ====
- Hawaii State Jurisdiction – Bishop Jesse T. Wilson, Sr.

==== Idaho ====
- Idaho Jurisdiction – Bishop Taro D. Golden

==== Illinois ====
- Illinois First – Bishop Charles H. McClelland (Interim), Bishop-Designate Michael Eaddy
- Illinois Third – Bishop Roland T. Sanders
- Illinois Fifth East – Bishop Linwood Dillard, General Board Member (Interim)
- Illinois Fifth West – Bishop Robert L. Perry, Jr.
- Illinois Sixth – Bishop Clowdell Williams, Sr.
- Illinois Central – Bishop Andrei V. Newbon
- Illinois Seventh – Bishop Designate R.D. Edward Goodwin Jr.
- Illinois Midwest – Bishop David Todd Whittley
- Illinois Historic Northern – Bishop Edwin Walker
- Illinois Southwest - Bishop Eugene Fears, Jr.
- Illinois Southeast – Bishop Otis A. Eanes, Sr.
- Illinois Southern – Bishop Embra Patterson, Jr.

==== Indiana ====
- Indiana First – Bishop Carl J. Steen, Jr.
- Indiana Second – Bishop J. Rashad Jones
- Indiana Third – Bishop E. Bobby Warren
- Indiana North Central Fourth – Bishop Donald Alford, Sr.

==== Iowa ====
- Iowa Jurisdiction – Bishop Leroy Johnson

==== Kansas ====
- Kansas Central – Bishop Milton Paul Jackson, Jr.
- Kansas East – Bishop Lemuel F. Thuston – Chairman of the General Assembly
- Kansas Southwest – Bishop Herman Lorenzo Hicks

==== Kentucky ====
- Kentucky First – Bishop John W. Fleming
- Kentucky Second – Bishop Darrell L. Hines (Interim)

==== Louisiana ====
- Louisiana First – Bishop James Proctor
- Louisiana East First – Bishop Alphonso Denson, Sr.
- Louisiana East Second – Bishop Gerald Hastings Hawkins, Sr.
- Louisiana East Third – Bishop Howard E. Quillen, Jr.
- Louisiana Greater New Orleans – Bishop Charles E. Brown, Sr.
- Louisiana South Central – Bishop Ezra Don Shannon
- Louisiana Central – Bishop Alton Gatlin

==== Maine ====
- Maine Jurisdiction – Bishop Steve Coleman

==== Maryland ====
- Maryland Central Jurisdiction – Bishop Carl A. Pierce, Sr.
- Maryland Eastern Shore – Bishop Paul Harmon
- Maryland Greater First – Bishop Joel H. Lyles, Jr.

==== Massachusetts ====
- Massachusetts First – Bishop Samuel Byron Hogan, Sr.
- Massachusetts Greater Jurisdiction – Bishop Talbert W. Swan, II, Assistant General Secretary, General Board Clerk

==== Michigan ====
- Canadian-Michigan Jurisdiction – Bishop Percy W. Henderson
- Michigan Great Lakes First – Bishop Michael E. Hill, Sr., General Board Member
- Michigan Great Lakes Second – Bishop Dwight Walls
- Michigan North Central – Bishop J. Drew Sheard, Presiding Bishop of the Church Of God In Christ, General Board Member
- Michigan Northeast – Bishop Zachary N. Hicks
- Michigan Southeast – Bishop Roger L. Jones, Sr. - Vice Chairman, Board Of Bishops
- Michigan Southwest Agape – Bishop Robert Delano Taylor, Sr.
- Michigan Southwest First – Bishop Marcus R. Ways
- Michigan Southwest Second – Bishop Ethan B. Sheard
- Michigan Southwest Third Jurisdiction – Bishop Samuel Duncan, Jr.
- Michigan Southwest Fourth Jurisdiction – Bishop Aaron I. Milton, Sr.
- Michigan Southwest Fifth – Bishop Don W. Shelby, Jr.
- Michigan Eastern – Bishop Charles J. Johnson, III
- Michigan Western Jurisdiction - Bishop Bruce A. McCoy
- Michigan Western Second Jurisdiction – Bishop James E. Atterberry, Sr.

==== Minnesota ====
- Minnesota Jurisdiction – Bishop Fred Willis Washington

==== Mississippi ====
- Mississippi Northern First – Bishop William Dean, Jr.
- Mississippi Southern First – Bishop Daniel T. Littleton
- Mississippi Southern Second – Bishop Kenneth E. Preston
- Mississippi Northwest – Bishop Robert Earl Barber

==== Missouri ====
- Missouri Eastern First – Bishop Marquaello Futrell, Sr.
- Missouri Eastern Second Western Illinois – Bishop Marvin Sanders
- Missouri Eastern Third - Bishop Robert D. Strong, Sr.
- Missouri Southeastern Third – Bishop Nathaniel Ellis
- Missouri Western First – Bishop Frank Douglas
- Missouri Western Second – Bishop John M. Johnson
- Missouri Midwest – Bishop Elijah H. Hankerson III, General Board Member
- Missouri Gateway - Bishop Melvin J. Smith, Vice Chairman of the General Assembly

==== Montana ====
- Montana Jurisdiction – Bishop Marcus L. Collins

==== Nebraska ====
- Nebraska First Jurisdiction – Bishop John O. Ford
- Nebraska Eastern Jurisdiction – Bishop Joseph L. Shannon, Sr.

==== Nevada ====
- Nevada First Jurisdiction – Bishop Donald C. Bronson
- Nevada Northern First Jurisdiction – Bishop Luther Dupree

==== New Hampshire ====
- New Hampshire Greater Jurisdiction – Bishop Bernard Reese

==== New Jersey ====
- New Jersey First – Bishop Mark K. Reid Sr.
- New Jersey Garden State – Bishop William T. Cahoon
- New Jersey Third – Bishop Kevin E. Knight, Sr.
- New Jersey South Jersey – Bishop Tyrone McCombs

==== New Mexico ====
- New Mexico Jurisdiction – Bishop James L'Keith Jones

==== New York ====
- New York Eastern First – Bishop James Pullings, Jr.
- New York Eastern Second – Bishop Rothel Highsmith
- New York Eastern Third – Bishop Frank A. White, General Board Member
- New York Eastern Fourth – Bishop Clarence L. Sexton, Jr.
- New York Eastern Fifth – Bishop Harrison Hale, Regional Bishop
- New York Eastern Sixth - Bishop Walter Willie, Jr.
- New York Southeast – Bishop Tyrone L. Butler, Assistant Financial Secretary
- New York Central – Bishop James Bowman, Sr.
- New York Western First – Bishop James R. Wright, Sr.
- New York Western Second – Bishop Glenwood Young
- New York Capital - Bishop Roderick L. Hennings

==== North Carolina ====
- North Carolina Greater – Bishop LeRoy Jackson Woolard
- North Carolina Second – Bishop Stenneth E. Powell, Sr.
- North Carolina Third – Bishop Patrick L. Wooden, Sr., Co-Chairman, International Men's Ministry

==== North Dakota ====
- North Dakota Jurisdiction – Bishop Michael R. Cole

==== Ohio ====
- Ohio Central East – Bishop David L. Herron, Sr.
- Ohio North First – Bishop Edward T. Cook
- Ohio Northwest – Bishop Clifford L. Kimbrough, Jr.
- Ohio Southern – Bishop George L. Carter
- Ohio West – Bishop Emmitt L. Nevels, Sr.

==== Oklahoma ====
- Oklahoma Northwest – Bishop Derwin Norwood, Sr
- Oklahoma Southeast – Bishop Malcolm W. Coby

==== Oregon ====
- Oregon First – Bishop Archie R. Hopkins, Sr.
- Oregon NW – Bishop Percy J. Mullen, Sr.

==== Pennsylvania ====
- Pennsylvania Commonwealth – Bishop Guy L. Glimp
- Pennsylvania Central – Bishop Edgar L. Scott
- Pennsylvania Eastern – Bishop David Morrell Screven
- Pennsylvania Western First – Bishop Marvin C. Moreland II
- Pennsylvania Western Second – Bishop Bernard S. Wallace
- Pennsylvania Keystone – Bishop Vernon Prioleau
- Pennsylvania Koinonia – Bishop Frank Anthone White - Interim Prelate / Bishop J. Louis Felton Prelate Designate

==== Rhode Island ====
- Rhode Island Jurisdiction – Bishop Roland P. Joyner Sr.

==== South Carolina ====
- South Carolina Jurisdiction – Bishop William A. Prioleau

==== South Dakota ====
- South Dakota Jurisdiction – Bishop Troy M. Carr

==== Tennessee ====
- Tennessee Central – Bishop Brandon B. Porter, General Board Member
- Tennessee Eastern First – Bishop Felton M. Smith Jr.
- Tennessee Eastern Second – Bishop Willie L. Bonner
- Tennessee Fourth – Bishop Jerry W. Maynard, General Board Member
- Tennessee Fifth – Bishop Jerry Wayne Taylor
- Tennessee Headquarters – Bishop David A. Hall Sr.
- Tennessee Metropolitan – Bishop Linwood Dillard Jr., General Board Member
- Tennessee Sixth – Bishop Charles H. Mason Patterson, Sr., General Treasurer
- Tennessee Southwest – Bishop William S. Wright Sr.

==== Texas ====
- Texas Central Metropolitan – Bishop Frank Fanniel Sr.
- Texas Covenant Jurisdiction - Bishop Gilbert Isaiah Gillum Jr.
- Texas East – Bishop James E Lee Jr
- Texas Greater Southeast First – Bishop Johnny A. Tates
- Texas Gulf Coast – Bishop Destry C. Bell
- Texas Golden Triangle Jurisdiction – Bishop Gary Louis Cantue
- Texas Lone Star Jurisdiction – Bishop Don Venson Nobles Sr.
- Texas Metropolitan – Bishop Joseph Jackson
- Texas North Central – Bishop Gerald W. Jones, Sr.
- Texas Northeast First – Bishop James E. Hornsby
- Texas Northeast Second – Bishop David R. Houston
- Texas Northeast Third – Bishop Nelson J. Gatlin
- Texas Northeast Fourth – Bishop Nathiel D. Wells
- Texas Northeast Fifth - Bishop Thomas L. Walker Sr.
- Texas Northwest – Bishop William H. Watson, III
- Texas South Central – Bishop Prince E. W. Bryant, Sr., General Board Member
- Texas Southeast First – Bishop Morris O. Jenkins, Jr.
- Texas Southeast Second – Bishop A. Ladell Thomas Jr.
- Texas Southeast Third – Bishop Travis T. Terry
- Texas Southwest First – Bishop Maurice Green Jr.
- Texas Southwest Second – Bishop Shelton C. Rhodes
- Texas Western – Bishop Juan O. Lawson

==== Utah ====
- Utah Jurisdiction – Bishop Bobby R. Allen

==== Vermont ====
- Vermont Ecclesiastical Jurisdiction – Bishop Talbert W. Swan, II, Assistant General Secretary, General Board Clerk

==== Virginia ====
- Virginia First – Bishop Marc A. Thomas, Sr., Trustee Board Member
- Virginia Second – Bishop Michael B. Golden, Jr., Financial Secretary
- Virginia Third – Bishop Jonathan G. Willis
- Virginia Fourth – Bishop G. Wesley Hardy Sr.
- Virginia Fifth – Bishop Clarence Sellers Jr

==== Washington ====
- Washington State Jurisdiction – Bishop Alvin C. Moore, Sr.
- Washington Northwest Jurisdiction – Bishop Reginald C. Witherspoon

==== West Virginia ====
- West Virginia Greater Jurisdiction – Bishop Clyde D. Brown

==== Wisconsin ====
- Wisconsin First Jurisdiction – Bishop Darrell L. Hines, General Board Member
- Wisconsin Northwest – Bishop Charles H. McClelland, General Board Member

==== Wyoming ====
- Wyoming Jurisdiction – Bishop Willie Harris

== Caribbean ==
=== Bahamas ===
- Bahamas Jurisdiction – Bishop Tony L. Hanna

=== Barbados ===
- Barbados/Caribbean Jurisdiction – Bishop Paul L. Fortson
- Barbados First - Bishop Arthur F. Mosley

=== Belize ===
- Belize Jurisdiction – Bishop Alber Oliver Quick
- Belize Second Jurisdiction - Bishop Anthony Richardson

=== Bermuda ===
- Bermuda Jurisdiction – Bishop Brent L Tiggs, Sr.

=== Costa Rica ===
- Costa Rica Jurisdiction - Bishop Harry Larnell Beard

=== Cuba ===
- Cuba Jurisdiction – Bishop Designate Moises Rodriguez

=== Dominican Republic ===
- Dominican Republic First Jurisdiction – Bishop Ron Gibson
- Dominican Republic Second Jurisdiction – Bishop Joseph J. Mayo, Sr
- Dominican Commonwealth Jurisdiction – Bishop B. Paul Fitzgerald

=== El Salvador ===
- El Salvador Jurisdiction - Bishop Herbert R Davis

=== Guatemala ===
- Guatemala Jurisdiction – Bishop Milton Hawkins

=== Haiti ===
- Haiti Jurisdiction - Bishop Leon Pamphile
- Haiti Second Commonwealth Jurisdiction - Bishop A. S. Hall, Sr.

=== Jamaica ===
- Jamaica Jurisdiction – Bishop Harold Haughton
- Jamaica (Second)Greater Jurisdiction – Bishop Joseph A. Chase Jr.

=== Puerto Rico ===
- Commonwealth of Puerto Rico – Bishop Elton J. Amos Sr.

=== Saint Lucia ===
- Saint Lucia Eastern Caribbean Jurisdiction - Bishop E. Charles Connor

=== Saint Croix ===
- Saint Croix Jurisdiction – Bishop Alan G. Porter

=== Saint Thomas ===
- Saint Thomas Ecclesiastical Jurisdiction - Bishop Ahmed M. Screven, Esq.

=== Sint Maarten ===
- Sint Maarten Rehoboth Jurisdiction – Bishop Robert G. Rudolph, Jr., General Secretary

=== Trinidad and Tobago ===
- Trinidad and Tobago First Jurisdiction – Bishop Corby Bush
- Trinidad & Tobago Second Jurisdiction – Bishop Joseph H.Griffith

=== Turks and Caicos ===
- Turks and Caicos Jurisdiction — Bishop Darrin Burns

== Africa ==
=== Angola ===
- Angola First - Bishop Macano Kamuimba Marcos Pedro

=== Democratic Republic of the Congo ===
- Congo First Jurisdiction – Bishop Muhangenu H. Ghilain
- Congo Second Jurisdiction - Bishop Matthew L Brown

=== Ethiopia ===
- Ethiopia First Jurisdiction – Bishop Ron Eugene Surrey
- Ethiopia Second Ecclesiastical Jurisdiction – Bishop T.D. Gordon

=== Gambia ===
- Senegambia West Africa Jurisdiction - Bishop Lorenzo D. Lee

=== Ghana ===
- Republic of Ghana Jurisdiction – Bishop Emmanuel A. Boateng
- Ghana West Africa Jurisdiction - Bishop Emmanuel Kofi Anim

=== Kenya ===
- Kenya, East Africa First Jurisdiction – Bishop Terence Rhone, Interim
- Kenya, Cornerstone First Jurisdiction – Bishop Francis Kamau
- Kenya, Impact Third Jurisdiction - Bishop Solomon Omo-Osagie
- Kenya, Fourth Ecclesiastical Jurisdiction - Bishop Quacy L. Smith, Sr.
- Kenya, Fifth Ecclesiastical Jurisdiction - Bishop Terry L. Turrentine
- Kenya, Sixth Ecclesiastical Jurisdiction - Bishop Mwanthi Anthony

=== Liberia ===
- Liberia Jurisdiction – Bishop Francis Stewart
- Liberia Second Jurisdiction - Bishop Thurston Jones

=== Malawi ===
- Malawi Central Jurisdiction – Bishop Ronald Sabawo
- Malawi Second Jurisdiction – Bishop Chifundo Mwanandi

=== Mozambique ===
- Mozambique – Bishop Terence P. Rhone, Interim (Missions President)

=== Nigeria ===
- Nigeria First Jurisdiction – Bishop Joseph O. Oipinejaro
- Nigeria Southern Jurisdiction – Bishop Henry Chikwudi
- Nigeria West Africa Jurisdiction – Bishop Lucky C. Donuwe
- Nigeria God is REAL Jurisdiction - Bishop Friday U Okwey.
- Nigeria Pinnacle Faith Jurisdiction - Bishop Louis O Morah.
- Nigeria PURITY Jurisdiction - Bishop Newlife Ugochukwu
- Nigeria Eastern Gateway - Bishop Onuigwe Emeka Dominic
- Nigeria Sanctuary of Peace Ecclesiastical Jurisdiction - Bishop Bolu Fam
- Nigeria United Ecclesiastical Jurisdiction - Bishop Micaiah J. Young, Sr.
- Nigeria Kingdom Life Jurisdiction - Bishop Earl L. Newton, Sr.

=== Ivory Coast ===
- West Ivory Coast Jurisdiction – Bishop Enoch Perry

=== Rwanda ===
- Rwanda East Africa Jurisdiction -- Bishop Jeffrey Melvin

=== South Africa ===
- South Africa – Bishop Vincent Mathews
- South Africa Second – Bishop Terence Rhone (Interim)
- South Africa Third – Bishop Terence Rhone (Interim)
- South Africa Fourth - Bishop Wayne Janecke
- South Africa Fifth – Bishop Ben Zulu
- South Africa Seventh – Bishop W. Johnny McNair Jr.

=== Tanzania ===
- Tanzania - Bishop Jaili W Kasekwa

=== Togo ===
- Togo - Bishop Archie Hopkins, Jr.

=== Sierra Leone ===
- Sierra Leone - Bishop Scott A. Bradley

=== Uganda ===
- Uganda East Africa Jurisdiction – Bishop Designate Jonathan Logan
- Uganda United Jurisdiction - Bishop Anthony Wheeler

=== Zambia ===
- Zambia First – Bishop Ngamitu Muhini
- Zambia Second - Bishop Justine Gondwe

== Asia ==
=== Japan ===
- Japan Jurisdiction - Bishop Carl Hodges

=== Philippines ===
- Philippines Jurisdiction – Bishop Avel Forto, Sr
- Philippines Second Jurisdiction - Bishop Avel Forto, Jr
- Philippines Northern Luzon Jurisdiction - Bishop Joel F. Balindan, Sr.
- Philippines Northern Mindanao Jurisdiction - Bishop Bob Steele
- Philippines Central Luzon Jurisdiction - Bishop Israel Forto

=== India ===
- India First Jurisdiction – Bishop Bevin G. Lawrence
- India Second Jurisdiction – Bishop Samram Paul
- India Third Jurisdiction – Bishop Edison Victor
- India Fourth Jurisdiction – Bishop Joseph Norfleet
- India Fifth Jurisdiction – Bishop G. Jeyakumar
- India Sixth Jurisdiction - Bishop Oscar Benton

=== Indonesia ===
- Indonesia – Bishop Terence P. Rhone (Interim)

=== Israel ===
- Israel Jurisdiction - Bishop Glenn Plummer

=== Maldives ===
- Maldives - Bishop Terrance Perkins

=== Pakistan ===
- Pakistan Jurisdiction – Bishop George Adebanjo

=== South Korea ===
- South Korea Jurisdiction – Bishop Chadwick F. Carlton

=== Sri Lanka ===
- Sri Lanka First - Bishop Blessing Titus Fernando

=== UAE Dubai ===
- UAE Dubai Jurisdiction - Bishop Amere May, Sr.

== South America ==
=== Argentina ===
- Argentina Jurisdiction – Bishop Terence P. Rhone (Interim)
- Argentina 2nd Jurisdiction - Bishop Ron C. Hill

=== Brazil ===
- Brazil First Jurisdiction – Bishop Terence P. Rhone, COGIC World Missions President
- Brazil Second Jurisdiction – Bishop Nate' M. Jefferson, Executive-Vice President COGIC World Missions
- Brazil Third Jurisdiction – Bishop Ivo Mariano

=== Chile ===
- Chile Jurisdiction - Bishop Gabriel McCurtis

=== Colombia ===
- Colombia 1st Jurisdiction - Bishop Lester Earl Johnson, II
- Colombia 2nd Jurisdiction - Bishop Edermin Cortes

=== Ecuador ===
- Ecuador Jurisdiction - Bishop Mark Brand

=== Guyana ===
- Guyana Jurisdiction – Bishop Curtis B. Sexton

=== Peru ===
- Peru Jurisdiction - Bishop Anthony Harris

=== Uruguay ===
- Uruguay Jurisdiction - Bishop Charles E. Gibson

=== Venezuela ===
- Venezuela Jurisdiction – Bishop Warren C. Dorris

== Europe ==
=== France ===
- France Jurisdiction – Bishop Marx G. Succes

=== Germany ===
- Germany Jurisdiction – Bishop Paul L. Watson

=== Greece ===
- Greece Jurisdiction – Bishop Terence P. Rhone (Interim)

=== Spain ===
- Spain Jurisdiction – Bishop Edwin C. Bass

=== United Kingdom ===
- United Kingdom Jurisdiction – Bishop Geoffrey E. Folkes

=== Italy ===
- Italy Jurisdiction – Bishop Frederick D. Jenkins

== Oceania ==
=== Australia ===
- Australia Jurisdiction – Bishop Paul E. Jones

== See also ==
- Church of God in Christ, Inc.
