= WLOK =

Radio station in Memphis, Tennessee

Coordinates: 35°07′02″N 90°00′58″W

Memphis, Tennessee; United States
- Broadcast area: Memphis metropolitan area
- Frequency: 1340 kHz

Programming
- Language: English
- Format: Gospel music

Ownership
- Owner: WLOK Radio, Inc.

History
- First air date: July 29, 1946
- Former call signs: WHHM (1946–1964)
- Call sign meaning: Station was owned by the OK Group from 1964 to 1968, replacing the former WLOK at 1480 AM (1956–1964)

Technical information
- Licensing authority: FCC
- Facility ID: 24214
- Class: C
- Power: 1,000 watts (unlimited)
- Translator: 104.9 W285FI (Memphis)

Links
- Public license information: Public file; LMS
- Webcast: Listen live
- Website: wlok.com

WLOK (1340 AM) is a commercial radio station licensed to Memphis, Tennessee, carrying a gospel music format. Owned by the Gilliam family doing business as WLOK Radio, Inc., the station serves the Memphis metropolitan area. WLOK's studios are located in Downtown Memphis and the transmitter resides in Memphis's Glenview Historic District. In addition to a standard analog transmission, WLOK is relayed over low-power Memphis translator W285FI (104.9 FM) and is available online.

WLOK operates on the fifth-oldest radio license in Memphis, which dates to 1946 as WHHM. One of the city's first personality-oriented stations, WHHM remained on the air through December 1962, when it was taken off the air amid a financial crisis and a disputed sale. It remained silent for more than a year before it was sold out of bankruptcy to the OK Group, which had operated Black-oriented WLOK at 1480 kHz from 1956 to 1964. WLOK and its programming moved to 1340 kHz on the former WHHM license in 1964, allowing it to broadcast with more power and at night for the first time. In 1977, the station became the first Black-owned radio station in Memphis under Gilliam Communications ownership, adopting its present gospel format in 1985.

== History ==
=== WHHM: The early years ===
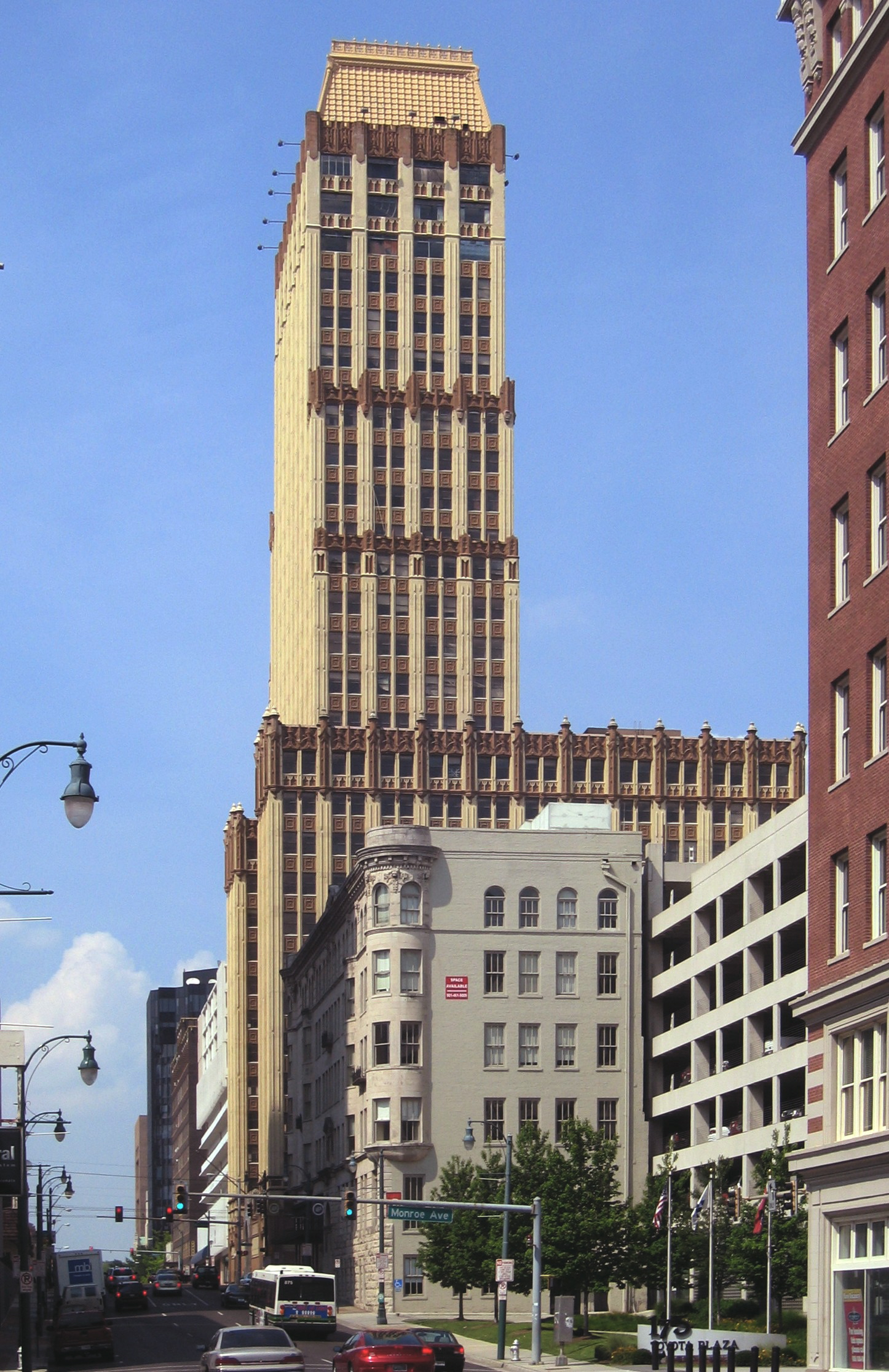
The Sterick Building housed the original studios of WHHM and the WHHM-FM transmitter.

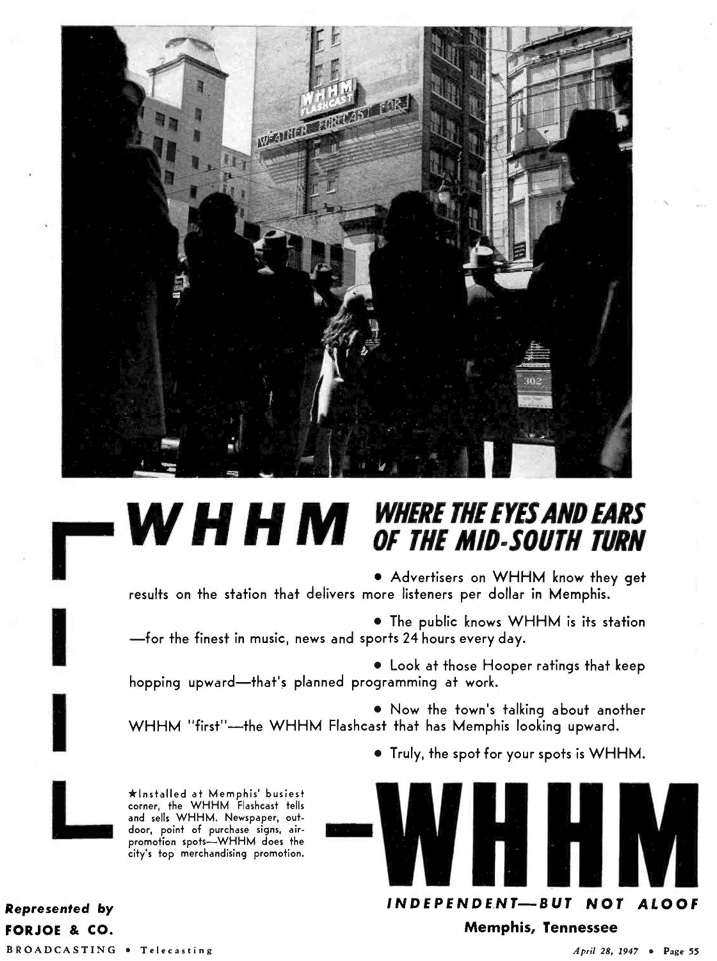
1947 advertisement as WHHM.

On August 14, 1945, Herbert Herff applied to the Federal Communications Commission (FCC) for a construction permit to build a new radio station to broadcast with 250 watts on 1340 kHz in Memphis. It was the second time Herff, a local auto dealer, had filed for a radio station that year; in January, he applied for an FM station at 45.3 MHz. The FM station was approved in November 1945, and the FCC approved the AM station permit on February 13, 1946. Construction immediately began on facilities to house the AM and FM stations in the Sterick Building, which would also be the location of the FM transmitter; the AM station would broadcast its signal from a site at Somerville and Ryder streets.

WHHM, the fifth radio station in Memphis, formally debuted July 29, 1946, with a two-hour-long opening program. (The call letters either represented the car dealership, Herbert Herff Motors, or the city, Herbert Herff/Memphis.) The Sterick Building facilities contained two studios, one of them 20 by 32 feet, as well as offices and a newsroom.

Herff owned the station for 14 months before selling the AM and the still-unbuilt FM to Mid-South Broadcasting Company, headed by Prentis Furlow, owner of KTBS in Shreveport, Louisiana, in 1947 for $300,000. The AM facility was moved to 46 Neely Street in 1949, and the FM station on 106.9 MHz was on test by the start of 1950, being briefly used in an emergency to feed WMCF during an ice storm in the first week of January. The transmitter used had previously belonged to WMCF. The FM briefly attempted separate programming in 1951 before being turned off on July 1 due to a "lack of enthusiasm" for the FM programming, which had been a financial failure.

After four years of independent operation, WHHM joined the Liberty Broadcasting System in 1950. The station had several notable DJs at this time, including big band vocalist Kenny Sargent and Ron Lundy, who got his first on-air work when the normal DJ failed to show for his shift and later went on to work at WABC in New York. It was one of the first local stations to focus on popular DJs and personalities, though in the mid-1950s increased competition began to dim the success the station enjoyed with this formula. WHHM moved to studios on Madison Avenue in 1957, vacating the Sterick Building studios, which were leased to Southern Bell.

=== Blumenthal, Shipp, and Grumbles ownership ===
WHHM was sold by Mid-South Broadcasting to Cy Blumenthal of Arlington, Virginia, in 1958. Blumenthal's chain of stations all aired country music formats, but Memphis presented a programming puzzle. The radio stations in town already served a wide variety of market segments, and KWEM (990 AM) covered the country format. A year later, Blumenthal sold WHHM to Thomas W. Shipp, a Jax Beer distributor with no other radio holdings. Shipp was able to rebound the station's ratings somewhat, though he also was confronted with a task of reconstruction. The Russwood Park fire, a five-alarm blaze in April 1960, destroyed the baseball stadium as well as the nearby WHHM studios and a bank branch, causing an estimated $1 million in damage. The fire nearly trapped the on-air announcer and his guest, who fled the burning station after black smoke entered the studio. Broadcasting shifted to the station's transmitter site, which had moved back to the Somerville Street site in 1954, before new studios opened in July in the Holiday Towers building. A dispute over covered losses escalated into litigation when Shipp sued the Agricultural Insurance Company, based in Watertown, New York, in a case that centered on the value of the radio station's lost record library and jingles. In April 1962, a federal jury awarded Shipp more than $74,000 in the case.

Shipp sold WHHM in August 1960 to Bill Grumbles, doing business as Mercury Broadcasting. Grumbles formerly had been a vice president of RKO Teleradio, owner in Memphis of WHBQ-AM-FM-TV, before cutting ties and searching for a station to own himself. Upon taking over in November, Grumbles replaced all the disc jockeys with a new airstaff, consisting mostly of former Memphians returning from other cities; he also changed the operation so that all music was played from cartridges instead of records. The station also increased daytime power to 1,000 watts in November 1962.

=== Silence ===
Grumbles's ownership was not a financially sound one, and a battle over control of station ownership escalated on December 28, 1962. That morning, the station went off the air, all 12 employees were fired, and armed guards were stationed at the studios; the afternoon Memphis Press-Scimitar's front page read "WHHM Off The Air, Staff Fired". The move came after Mercury Broadcasting had filed to sell the station back to Shipp in exchange for the cancellation of more than $140,000 in debt. However, two Connecticut men, Victor Muscat and Joseph P. Trantino, claimed to have bought a minority stake in the station from another Mercury shareholder and objected to the transaction. They were successful in halting the sale, and a new complication emerged. In early February 1963, it was revealed that federal investigators were looking into two other Shipp businesses for potential mail fraud and that Shipp's whereabouts were unknown.

On March 13, WHHM filed for bankruptcy; the filing listed $94,000 in assets against $511,000 in liabilities and attached Shipp to an address in Sherman Oaks, California. A secretary testified that Shipp kept a second WHHM bank account even after selling the station and commingled personal and business funds; she noted that most of Shipp's capital investment came from a lease-back arrangement with a New York company for the station's equipment. After returning and testifying in his own case, Shipp himself was declared bankrupt in April after a petition from a creditor of another Shipp business; the judge in that case noted Shipp's "effort to defraud" his creditors. WHHM's largest creditor was Shipp, owed $146,000; that sum was also his largest asset against more than $320,000 of debts.

Meanwhile, Marvin C. Goff, trustee in bankruptcy, was tasked with finding a buyer for the radio station, reporting in June that two experienced broadcasters were "very strong prospects" to purchase the outlet. The lead offer came from the OK Group, which already had a Memphis radio station on the air: WLOK (1480 AM), the city's second Black-oriented station; it had been on the air with those call letters and under OK's ownership since 1956, having taken on that format two years prior. The $135,000 deal, plus $15,000 from the state of Tennessee for the condemnation of the transmitter site in order to build today's Interstate 240, would give WHHM's creditors 33 cents of every dollar they were owed. Meanwhile, WLOK would move its programming from 1480 to 1340 kHz, build a new transmitter facility to take advantage of the nighttime broadcasting authorization on 1340 kHz (though 1480 kHz was authorized for 5,000 watts during daylight hours, more than 1340), and sell the 1480 kHz license. With Goff explaining that the WHHM license had been a "dog" to sell, the deal was approved by a federal bankruptcy referee on July 16.

=== WLOK: OK Group and Starr ownership ===
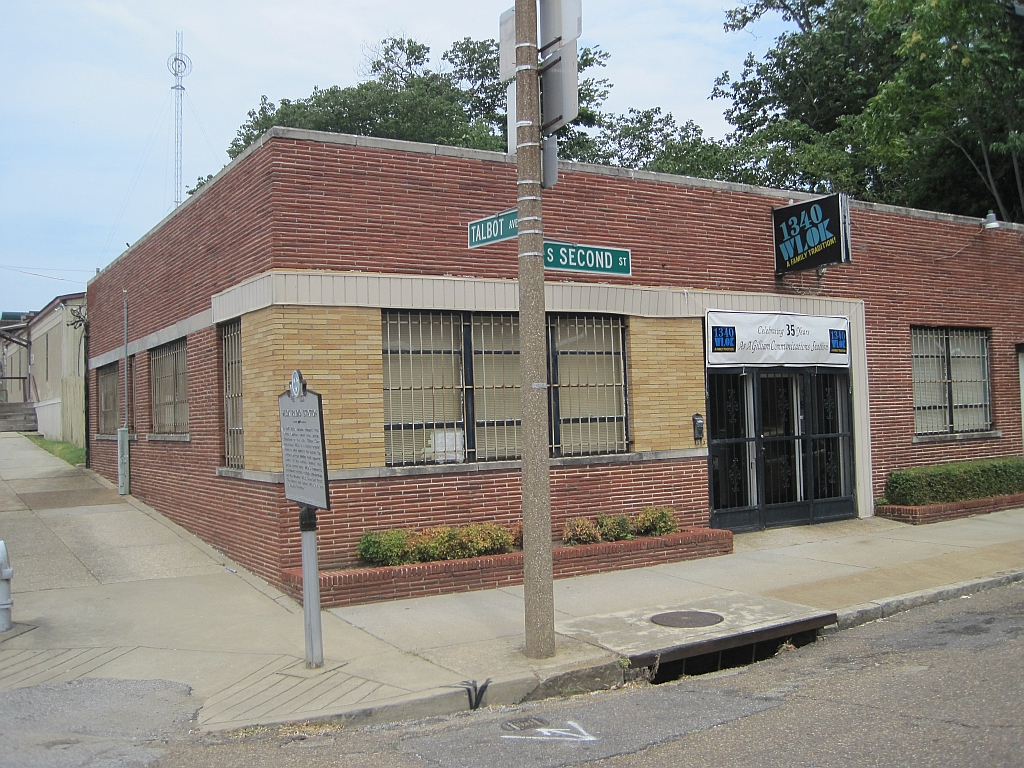
The WLOK studios at 363 S. Second Street predate WLOK's 1964 move to 1340 kHz.

On December 31, 1963, the FCC granted an application to transfer the license and to relocate the transmitter to the existing WLOK site at 1386 South McLemore Avenue. As part of the sale, the 1480 facility was sold to Century Broadcasting of Fort Worth, Texas. On April 11, 1964, WLOK and its programming moved from 1480 to 1340 kHz, with the 1480 frequency becoming a separate station as WMQM; WLOK programmed the new frequency from its existing Second Street studios. The studios were just blocks from the Lorraine Motel; when Martin Luther King Jr. was shot and killed on April 4, 1968, death threats were made on Tom Watson—the station's only White employee—who had to be escorted out of the building.

In November 1968, the OK Group sold three stations—KYOK in Houston, WBOK in New Orleans, and WLOK—to Starr Broadcasting Group of Omaha, Nebraska, in a multimillion-dollar transaction. The sale, consummated the next year, did not affect the station's format, but Starr did promise to add employees. One of the major stakeholders of Starr, an entirely White-owned company, was William F. Buckley Jr., a conservative political commentator and founder of the National Review, yet WLOK frequently ran news editorials that ran in direct opposition to Buckley's views. When this was pointed out in an early July 1971 article in The New Yorker magazine, two White employees were fired and a third transferred to New Orleans. The new general manager, Billy T. Lathem, was viewed by the 11 Black employees on staff as an "Uncle Tom who made promises but didn't carry them through". As a result, they walked out and were fired on July 21, demanding the firing of the new general manager, a pay raise, and an expanded staff with more full-time employees. Members of the Black Panther Party joined a picket line and condemned what they saw as "racist control of our people's information". By December, Harvey Lynch, who was Black, had replaced Lathem as WLOK's general manager.

In its final years, WLOK launched one of its longest-running traditions when it organized the first "Stone Soul Picnic", a concert series and family gathering that in its first year had higher turnout than anticipated. Now held at Tom Lee Park, the annual event is still organized by the station.

=== Gilliam ownership ===
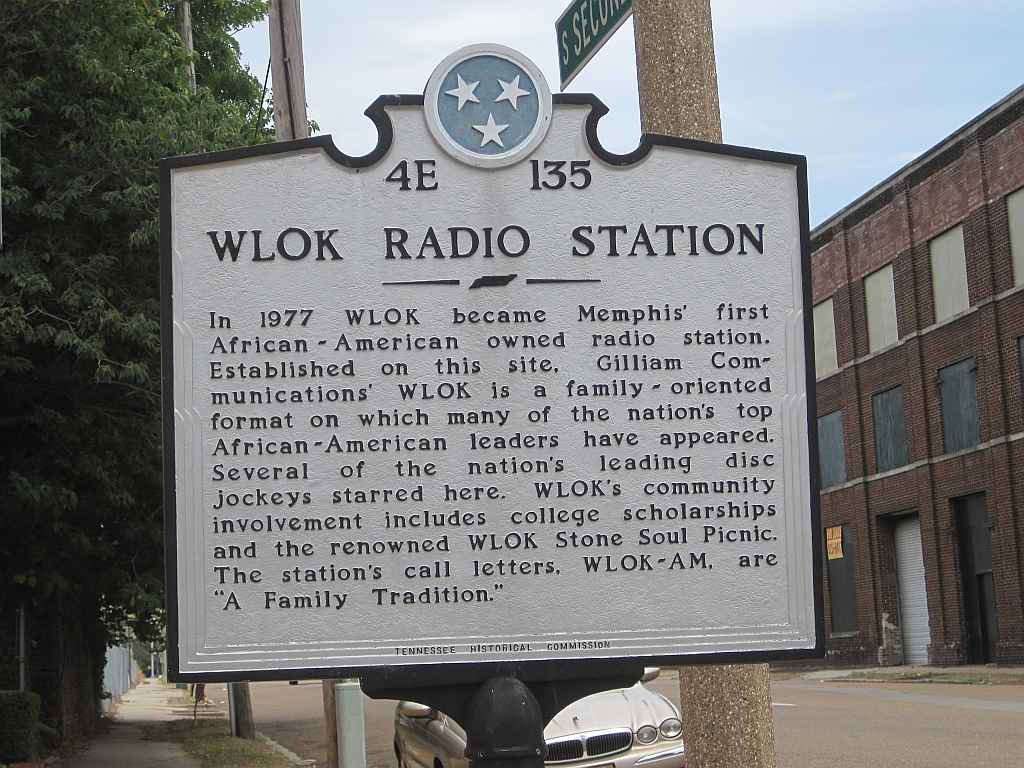
Tennessee Historical Commission plaque at the WLOK studios

In late 1976, Starr Broadcasting, citing an interest in bigger markets and a shift in "other directions", sold WLOK to Art Gilliam for $725,000. The acquisition closed in January 1977, marking a milestone in Memphis radio. Gilliam was the first Black reporter on Memphis television at WMC-TV in October 1968, and WLOK became the first Black-owned radio station in the city. He had pursued the station since 1975, initially backing off when Starr set a $1 million purchase price, but Starr eventually opted to sell under pressure to reduce its debt.

Adding jazz to its format and putting Operation PUSH back on its air after it was taken off under Starr ownership due to complaints and threats of a boycott, the retooled WLOK made an immediate ratings impression against its longtime competitor, WDIA, settling in as a consistent second-place to WDIA. Over the years, what had been a more teen-oriented station shifted its focus to adults, adopting a gospel format in 1985 in order to stave off competition from FM stations adopting the same urban contemporary format WLOK had. Gilliam Communications made several other expansions: it attempted to win the rights to channel 13 in Memphis when RKO General was to be replaced as owner of WHBQ-TV, and it ran station WERD in Jacksonville, Florida, for four years before selling it at a loss. In 1999, it acquired WHGM in Savannah, Georgia. WLOK was also recognized in the 1990s and early 2000s as one of the leading gospel stations in the United States, including by Religion & Media Monthly magazine and the National Black Programmers Coalition. Over the years, WLOK has added more talk programs to its schedule; it also started a Black Film Festival.

In 2016, WLOK acquired an FM translator in Arkadelphia, Arkansas, to be moved to Memphis and paired with WLOK, giving the station its first FM signal of any kind since WHHM-FM went off air in 1951.
