= Gilbert E. Patterson =

American pastor (1939–2007)

His Grace the Most Reverend Gilbert Earl Patterson
- Church: Temple of Deliverance Church of God in Christ
- In office: 1975–2007 (Pastor) 1986–2007 (Bishop) 1988-2001 (Jurisdictional Bishop) 1992-2007 (General Board) 2000–2007 (Presiding Bishop)
- Predecessor: Chandler David Owens, Sr.
- Successor: Charles Edward Blake, Sr.

Personal details
- Born: September 22, 1939 Humboldt, Tennessee, U.S.
- Died: March 20, 2007 (aged 67) Memphis, Tennessee, U.S.
- Spouse: Louise Dowdy Patterson (January 27, 1938 – November 20, 2022)
- Occupation: Presiding Bishop, Church of God in Christ, Pastor, Televangelist, Singer

Gilbert Earl Patterson (September 22, 1939 – March 20, 2007) was an American Holiness Pentecostal leader and pastor. He served as the founding pastor of the Temple of Deliverance COGIC Cathedral of Bountiful Blessings, one of the largest COGIC churches in the Eastern United States, from 1975 to 2007. He also served as the Presiding Bishop the Church of God in Christ (COGIC), a 6 million-member Holiness Pentecostal denomination from 2000 to 2007.

Patterson was the second youngest person ever elected Presiding Bishop of COGIC at the age of 60 in 2000, second to Bishop J. O. Patterson Sr., who was elected at 56 in 1968. Patterson was famously known across many Christian denominations for being an educated Pentecostal-Charismatic preacher and theologian, and known for his eloquent and musically charismatic preaching style, which was often featured on his church's television broadcasts through BET and the Word Network.

On March 28, 2007, the United States Senate passed a resolution celebrating the life of Patterson. The sponsors were Senators Barack Obama, Carl Levin, John Kerry, Lamar Alexander and Bob Corker.

== Early years and education ==
Patterson was born in Humboldt, Tennessee on September 22, 1939, to William Archie and Mary Louise Williams Patterson. His family was living in Mississippi at the time, but shortly after in 1941, they moved to Memphis so his father could serve at the Holy Temple, a COGIC church. His father was a COGIC minister, which later led to his own involvement in the church. G.E. Patterson regularly attended church. He accepted and affirmed COGIC traditions and teachings. In 1952, his family moved to Detroit, Michigan so his father could serve at the New Jerusalem COGIC. A few years later in 1958, Patterson decided to attend Detroit Bible College. He also attended LeMoyne-Owen College in Memphis and held an honorary doctorate from Oral Roberts University. After completing his education he returned to Memphis to co-pastor with his father in 1961.

== Career ==
Patterson served in ministry for 50 years before dying of heart failure due to complications from Prostate cancer in 2007 at the age of 67. During his time as a minister, he led the largest Pentecostal religious group in the nation consisting of 5.5 million members.

=== Early ministry and departure from COGIC ===
In 1958, G.E. Patterson was ordained as an Elder, and in 1961 would serve as co-pastor of Holy Temple COGIC with his father, Bishop W.A. Patterson. Between 1969 and 1975, Patterson supported his father in a controversy over returning to Memphis to serve as Bishop of West Tennessee. The then Presiding Bishop J.O. Patterson Sr. (G.E. Patterson's uncle) sought to reserve jurisdiction to himself, claiming that the Presiding Bishop should be Bishop of Memphis in the way the Pope is Bishop of Rome. By the time of the 1974 Holy Convocation, the COGIC General Board supported J.O. Patterson's contention, and prepared to move against W.A. and G.E. Patterson to have them removed from Holy Temple. In February 1975, G.E Patterson resigned as co-pastor of Holy Temple and withdrew from the denomination, in an effort to avoid further efforts against his father.

=== Founding Temple of Deliverance and Bountiful Blessings Ministries ===
Patterson continued ministry outside of the COGIC through several endeavors. In March 1975, Patterson founded Bountiful Blessings Temple of Deliverance (also known as: Temple of Deliverance, Cathedral of Bountiful Blessings), which he pastored until his death. Then Apostle Patterson also established Bountiful Blessings Ministries and Bountiful Blessings Deliverance Church, Inc., through which he would organize eight independent churches. Temple of Deliverance grew rapidly and had numerous members. The Temple of Deliverance allowed Patterson to hold close to his Pentecostal roots and black holiness.

=== Return to COGIC ===
In 1986, Patterson rejoined COGIC following a General Board vote to invite him to return to as a Jurisdictional Bishop in Memphis; Patterson would be made a bishop in the denomination later that year. In 1988, Patterson was made Prelate of Tennessee 4th Ecclesiastical Jurisdiction by Presiding Bishop J.O. Patterson Sr., fulfilling the prior decision of the General Board. His ability to preach simple and understandable messages made him appealing to all age groups. At one point, he was the only COGIC minister with an international audience, reaching around 20 million people watch his Sunday television broadcasts.

=== Election to the General Board, and first campaign for Presiding Bishop ===
In 1992, Patterson was elected to the General Board of COGIC, the denomination's 12 member board of directors that serve four year terms, and was re-elected in 1996, 2000, and 2004. Patterson ran for Presiding Bishop in 1996 against Chandler D. Owens, then serving as Acting Presiding Bishop after Presiding Bishop Louis H. Ford died in office the previous year. Patterson lost the election by a single vote, and conceded the election to Bishop Owens.

Patterson never formally disputed the result of the election, but claimed in a March 1997 sermon, that a computer tabulation error rejected over forty ballots which, when counted, would have resulted in his victory. He further claimed that he declined to contest the election to avoid division:

...I didn't even - I didn't lose the election. Officially, it said one vote I was edged out. But then there were the forty something votes that were kicked out of the computer, that when they counted those, it said I won it. But the fact still remain[s], I said, I love the church too much. I don't want to divide the body. I don't even want a recount. Let the thing go; and I've been through with it since that day...

— G.E. Patterson, "Tape #788: Divine Worship", Bountiful Blessings, Inc.

Patterson, having won election to the General Board, served his four year term and was reelected to the Board in 2000.

=== Second campaign and election as Presiding Bishop ===
In 2000, Patterson ran for Presiding Bishop again, against Bishop Owens, and was elected Presiding Bishop of COGIC. Patterson became the first candidate to defeat an incumbent Presiding Bishop in the denomination's history. Patterson took the unprecedented step of asking the General Assembly to certify the election, which it did. Patterson further called on the denomination to devise a way of honoring the outgoing Presiding Bishop with a formal title and stipend. Patterson also opted to break with the informal practice of Presiding Bishops concurrently remaining Prelate of their home jurisdiction, with Bishop Jerry L. Maynard serving as Prelate of Tennessee 4th Jurisdiction during Patterson's tenure.

In 2004, Patterson was reelected to a second term as Presiding Bishop by acclamation, and served until his death in 2007. Patterson was succeeded by the First Assistant Presiding Bishop, Charles E. Blake Sr.

== Civil Rights involvement ==
Patterson was deeply involved in the Memphis Sanitation Workers Strike in 1968. This is notable due to COGIC members having had a reputation for being disconnected from the Civil Rights Movements of the 1950s and 1960s at the time. He was a founder of COME, Memphis Community on the Move for Equality, which played a powerful role in the strike. Patterson encouraged Memphis to support the strike through his radio broadcasts. His involvement in the strike demonstrated the amplitude of diverse grassroots black activists that exercised collective agency in order to pursue freedom as well as justice for oppressed and marginalized communities, especially during the African American Civil Rights Movement of the 1960s .

== Illness and death ==
In 2003 Patterson was diagnosed with prostate cancer, and publicly disclosed his diagnosis and ongoing treatment during a church service in 2005. Patterson continued serving as Pastor of Temple of Deliverance, and COGIC Presiding Bishop. In a sermon, delivered sometime after announcing his illness, Patterson expressed that he had no intention of dying in office:

I said, from the day I was elected, I don't want to die in office as Presiding Bishop of the Church of God in Christ. [...] I don't intend to be rolled out of that office. I intend to walk out; and I intend to still have years to preach after I walk out.

— G.E. Patterson, Sermon: "Your Fate Is A Blessing From God", Bountiful Blessings, Inc.

In 2007, Patterson died of heart failure due to complications with prostate cancer, at age 67, during his second term as Presiding Bishop.

== Legacy and Awards ==
Patterson was succeeded as Presiding Bishop by Charles E. Blake Sr., and as Pastor of Temple of Deliverance by Milton R. Hawkins. Patterson's widow, Louise Patterson, became CEO of Bountiful Blessings Ministries, Podium Records, and general manager of WBBP radio.

Patterson was annually named as one of the Power 150 Religious Leaders by Ebony Magazine, for several years until his death in 2007, alongside fellow COGIC Bishop, Bishop Charles E. Blake, who would actually succeed Patterson as Presiding Bishop of the COGIC denomination. Patterson was also the editor and publisher of the Bountiful Blessings Magazine, which had a distribution list of over 100,000. His book Here Comes the Judge: Finding Freedom for The Promised Land, a Christian theological book he wrote about submitting and surrendering your life to the sovereignty of God as a Christian believer, comparing doing so to Moses and the Israelites from the Old Testament, received high praise and sold thousands of copies.
