= Chandler David Owens Sr. =

Former Presiding Bishop of the Christ of God in Christ (1931-2011)

His Grace the Most Reverend Chandler David Owens Sr.
- Church: Wells Cathedral Church of God in Christ
- In office: 1995-2000 (Presiding Bishop) 1976-2011 (General Board)
- Predecessor: Louis Henry Ford
- Successor: Gilbert Earl Patterson

Personal details
- Born: October 2, 1931 Birmingham, Alabama, U.S.
- Died: March 6, 2011 (aged 79) Atlanta, Georgia, U.S.
- Spouse: Shirley Owens
- Children: 3 (1 deceased)
- Occupation: Presiding Bishop, Church of God in Christ, Pastor, minister

Chandler David Owens Sr. (October 2, 1931 – March 6, 2011) was an American minister and Holiness Pentecostal denomination leader of the Church of God in Christ (COGIC), for which he served as the Presiding Bishop from 1995 to 2000, after the death of Bishop Louis Henry Ford.

== Early life ==
Bishop Owens was born in Birmingham, Alabama, to Elder William Owens and Martha [Thomas] Owens. The fifth of eight children, Bishop Owens and his family attended the Smithfield Church of God in Christ in Birmingham. When Elder William Owens was assigned to pastor the Power View Church of God in Christ, his son assumed the role of Junior Pastor and served as a driver to the church's founder Bishop Charles Harrison Mason. In June 1950, after Owens had graduated from A.H Parker High School, the family moved to Detroit and worshiped under the pastorate of Bishop John Bailey.

== Ministerial Career ==
After moving to Newark, New Jersey, Bishop Owens was assigned his first pastorate at the Wells Cathedral Church of God in Christ and was consecrated Bishop of New Jersey's Third Ecclesiastical Jurisdiction in 1973. In 1976 he became the youngest bishop elected to the General Board of the COGIC, a position he held until his death.

During this period Bishop Owens also served the church in a number of additional capacities including as International President of the Youth Congress, Chairman of the Constitution Committee, Second Assistant Presiding Bishop and First Assistant Presiding Bishop. He moved to Georgia to serve as Pastor of the Greater Community Church of God In Christ in Marietta and, subsequently, as the Prelate of Central Georgia Ecclesiastical Jurisdiction.

In 1995, after the death of Bishop L. H. Ford, Bishop Owens was elected Presiding Bishop of the church. During his tenure as Presiding Bishop, he served on several committees under President Bill Clinton administration and hosted the President at the International Annual Holy Convocation in Memphis, Tennessee, the Bishop's Conference in Washington, DC, and the International Women's Convention in New Orleans, Louisiana. He served as the presiding bishop until 2000 when Bishop G. E. Patterson was elected to the post.

== Death ==
Bishop Owens died in Atlanta at the age of 79. He left behind his wife Mrs. Shirley Owens and three children, Chandler David II and Chandra Stephanie. A third daughter Shirilitha Jeanette is now deceased.

== Honors and awards ==
In August 1995 Bishop Owens was declared an Arkansas Traveler by Governor Jim Guy Tucker, and in August 1996 was presented the key to the city of Birmingham, Alabama, by Councilman Aldrich Gunn. October 26, 2003 was officially declared "Bishop Chandler David Owens Day" in Newark, NJ, by Mayor Sharpe James. In March 2011 Bishop Owens was posthumously presented the Phoenix Award by Atlanta Mayor Kassim Reed.
