= Charles Edward Blake Sr. =

Presiding Bishop Emeritus of the Church of God in Christ

His Grace the Most Reverend Charles Edward Blake Sr.
- Presiding Bishop Emeritus
- Archdiocese: Los Angeles
- Diocese: Church of God in Christ, Global
- Elected: April 2007, November 2008, November 2012, November 2016
- Installed: January 21, 2008
- Term ended: March 20, 2021
- Predecessor: Gilbert E. Patterson
- Successor: John Drew Sheard, Sr.
- Previous post: First Assistant Presiding Bishop (2001–2007)

Orders
- Ordination: August 1962 by Samuel M. Crouch
- Consecration: November 1985 by James Oglethorpe Patterson Sr.

Personal details
- Born: August 5, 1940 (age 86) Little Rock, Arkansas, U.S.
- Denomination: Church of God in Christ
- Residence: Los Angeles, California
- Parents: Bishop J.A. Blake Sr., Mother Lula Blake
- Spouse: Mae Lawrence Blake
- Education: Interdenominational Theological Center

Styles of Charles Edward Blake Sr.
- Reference style: His Grace; The Most Reverend
- Spoken style: Your Grace
- Religious style: Bishop

Charles Edward Blake Sr. (born August 5, 1940) is an American minister and retired pastor who served as the Presiding Bishop and leader of the Church of God in Christ, a 6 million-member Holiness Pentecostal denomination, from 2007 to 2021. On March 21, 2007, he became the Presiding Bishop of the Church of God in Christ.

In November 2008, Bishop Blake was re-elected to serve a four-year term as Presiding Bishop. In November 2012, Bishop Blake was re-elected to serve a four-year term as the Presiding Bishop. He was reelected to a third term as Presiding Bishop on November 15, 2016. On October 23, 2020, Blake announced that he would not seek a re-election as Presiding Bishop nor as a member of the General Board and that he would retire from the Office of Presiding Bishop and from the General Board in 2021. He officially retired on March 19, 2021.

== Biography ==
Charles Blake was born on August 5, 1940, in Little Rock, Arkansas, to the late Bishop Junious Augustus (J. A.) Blake Sr. and the late Evangelist Lula M. Blake. He has one older brother, J. A. Blake Jr., who is also a bishop and pastor in the COGIC denomination in San Diego, California. He became a Christian and converted to Pentecostal Christianity as a young adolescent, under the ministry of his mother and father in Arkansas, and he and his family moved to Los Angeles when he was in his 20's when his father was asked to take over as a bishop of the First Jurisdiction of Southern California for the COGIC denomination.

In 1969, he was asked by his father and by Southern California COGIC bishop, Bishop Samuel M. Crouch, to take over as the pastor of the West Angeles Church of God in Christ. He was officially installed as the senior pastor of the church the following year in 1970. It was also around this time, that he married his wife, Mae Lawrence Blake, a native of Michigan and daughter of another COGIC bishop and pastor, and they had three children together, Charles Blake Jr., Lawrence "Larry" Blake, and Kimberly Blake.

Bishop Blake was the pastor of the West Angeles Church of God in Christ, one of the largest African-American churches in the Western United States, with a membership of over 24,000, from 1969 until his retirement in 2022. The church started with only 50 members in 1969 when he became pastor.

In 1982, he was selected by Ebony magazine as one of the 15 "Greatest Preachers in America". Since 2007, Ebony has recognized Bishop Blake annually, as one of its 100+ most influential African Americans. In the 1990's and early 2000's, Blake also penned articles for Ebony and Christianity Today noting the importance of the Black Church's influence on presidential elections and American politics and society in general. In 1984, after the death of his father, he was ordained and consecrated as a jurisdictional bishop of the First Ecclesiastical Jurisdiction of Southern California for the COGIC denomination, and remained in that position until 2009 when he stepped down from the position to dedicate himself fully to the duties of the Office of the Presiding Bishop.

He was also a member of the General Board, the twelve head religious and executive leaders and head bishops of the COGIC denomination from 1988 until 2021.

He supports education and academics and holds multiple academic and honorary degrees from various institutions. On June 12, 2010, Biola University conferred an honorary doctorate upon him.

Between 2009 and 2011, in response to the HIV/AIDS crisis in Africa, Blake founded and was the first president of the Pan African Children's Fund (PACF). Save Africa's Children, a program of PACF, currently provides support to over 220 charity missions and orphanages throughout sub-Saharan Africa.

He was the founding Chair of the Board of Directors for, and has served as a board member of the Executive Committee of the Board of Directors, for the Interdenominational Theological Seminary. Blake has served as Chair of the Executive Committee, member of the Board of Directors of Oral Roberts University, and as a member of the Board of Directors of International Charismatic Bible Ministries.

Blake has also formerly served as an Advisory Committee Member of the Pentecostal World Conference, and as the founder and Co-chair of the Los Angeles Ecumenical Congress (LAEC), an interdenominational coalition of religious leaders and pastors for the city of Los Angeles. He has also been awarded the Salvation Army's William Booth Award, the Greenlining Institute's Big Heart Award, and was the designated recipient of the L.A. Urban League's Whitney M. Young Award for the year 2000. In 2009 he was appointed as a member of Barack Obama's Inaugural Advisory Council of the Office of Faith-based and Neighborhood Partnerships where he served for one year on the council.

In 2016, Bishop Blake was appointed as the Co-Chairperson to the leadership council of the Pentecostal/Charismatic Churches of North America. On November 15, 2016, Bishop Blake was reelected as the Presiding Bishop of the Church of God in Christ during the 2016 COGIC Election held by the COGIC General Assembly to a third four-year term. On October 23, 2020, Bishop Blake announced that he will not seek re-election as Presiding Bishop nor as a member of the General Board. He officially retired on March 19, 2021, and was succeeded by Bishop J. Drew Sheard Sr. as Presiding Bishop on March 20, 2021.

On April 24, 2022, while addressing his local congregation at the West Angeles COGIC for their sunday morning service, he announced that he has been dealing with and coping with Parkinson's disease, "for the past ten years", and that as of April 2022, he was going to be retiring as the senior pastor of West Angeles COGIC, and that his two sons who are also COGIC elders and ministers, Reverends Charles Jr. and Lawrence Blake, would be taking over as the de facto pastor and assistant pastor of the West Angeles congregation, respectively.

He announced that he met with the ministry leaders and church council and trustee board members and consulted with them to approve of Charles Jr. and Lawrence Blake, taking over much of his duties as the de facto pastor and assistant pastor of the church. However, he said in his remarks that he did not want to use the word "retirement" as he said, "he would still be worshiping and fellowshiping with the saints of God in worship services, and that he would still be around for anyone who needs pastoral and fatherly counseling, prayer, and mentorship." He added that he would no longer be carrying out his official duties as senior pastor of the church, and that he would "continue to serve the Lord Jesus Christ and serve the ministries of West Angeles however the Lord leads me and however you all may need me as the Lord sees fit and allows me to live on, so consider myself as semi-retired."

His sons Charles Jr. and Lawrence Blake were officially appointed as the senior pastor and assistant pastor of the church in October 2022. In August of 2024, his younger son, Reverend Lawrence Blake, stepped down as assistant pastor of West Angeles, in order to become the senior pastor of the Palm Lane Church of God in Christ, where he was installed as the official senior pastor of the Palm Lane Church on September 1, 2024.
