= New Christian (disambiguation) =

A New Christian was a convert from Judaism to Christianity in Iberia.

New Christian may also refer to:

- Individuals who have recently converted to Christianity
- "New Christians", members of The New Church (Swedenborgian).
- Members of the Christian right, sometimes known as the New Christian right
- Members of Endeavor Academy, also known as New Christian Church of Full Endeavor
- Members of the political party Christian Movement for a New Haiti.
