= History of religion =

The history of religion is the written record of human religious feelings, thoughts, and ideas. This period of religious history begins with the invention of writing about 5,200 years ago (3200 BCE). The prehistory of religion involves the study of religious beliefs that existed prior to the advent of written records. One can also study comparative religious chronology through a timeline of religion, or the interrelationships and historical diversification of religious ideologies through the use of evolutionary philosophy and broad comparativism. Writing played a major role in standardizing religious texts regardless of time or location and making easier the memorization of prayers and divine rules.

The concept of "religion" was formed in the 16th and 17th centuries. Sacred texts like the Bible, the Quran, and others did not have a word or even a concept of religion in the original languages and neither did the people or the cultures in which these sacred texts were written. Many cultures around the world today and in the past lack concepts or reject distinctions between the natural and supernatural.

The word religion as used in the 21st century does not have an obvious pre-colonial translation into non-European languages. The anthropologist Daniel Dubuisson writes that "what the West and the history of religions in its wake have objectified under the name 'religion' is ... something quite unique, which could be appropriate only to itself and its own history".

== History of study ==
The school of religious history called the Religionsgeschichtliche Schule, a late 19th-century German school of thought, originated the systematic study of religion as a socio-cultural phenomenon. It depicted religion as evolving with human culture, from polytheism to monotheism.

The Religionsgeschichtliche Schule emerged at a time when scholarly study of the Bible and of church history flourished in Germany and elsewhere (see higher criticism, also called the historical-critical method). The study of religion is important: religion and similar concepts have often shaped civilizations' law and moral codes, social structure, art and music.

In order to better understand the origin and current diversity of religious belief systems throughout the world, recent studies have attempted to focus on historical interrelationships and diversification of all major organized religions, applying modern evolutionary philosophy to the comparative analysis of putative ideological groups. These studies take an agnostic, pluralistic approach in the hope of moving beyond chauvinistic cultural tribalism, which is increasingly interfering with our ability to understand "other" cultures and address growing global challenges.

== Origin ==
The earliest archeological evidence interpreted by some as suggestive of the emergence of religious ideas dates back several hundred thousand years, to the Middle and Lower Paleolithic periods: some archaeologists conclude that the apparently intentional burial of archaic humans, Neanderthals and even Homo naledi as early as 300,000 years ago is proof that religious ideas already existed, but such a connection is entirely conjectural. Other evidence that some infer as indicative of religious ideas includes symbolic artifacts from Middle Stone Age sites in Africa. However, the interpretation of early Paleolithic artifacts, with regard to how they relate to religious ideas, remains controversial. Archeological evidence from more recent periods is less controversial. Scientists generally interpret a number of artifacts from the Upper Paleolithic (50,000–13,000 BCE) as representing religious ideas. Examples of Upper Paleolithic remains that some associate with religious beliefs include the lion man, the Venus figurines, and the elaborate ritual burial from Sungir.

In the 19th century, researchers proposed various theories regarding the origin of religion, challenging earlier claims of a Christianity-like urreligion. Early theorists, such as Edward Burnett Tylor (1832–1917) and Herbert Spencer (1820–1903), emphasized the concept of animism, while archaeologist John Lubbock (1834–1913) used the term "fetishism". Meanwhile, the religious scholar Max Müller (1823–1900) theorized that religion began in hedonism and the folklorist Wilhelm Mannhardt (1831–1880) suggested that religion began in "naturalism" – by which he meant mythological explanations for natural events. All of these theories have been widely criticized since then; there is no broad consensus regarding the origin of religion.

Pre-pottery Neolithic A (PPNA) Göbekli Tepe, the oldest potentially religious site yet discovered anywhere includes circles of erected massive T-shaped stone pillars, the world's oldest known megaliths decorated with abstract, enigmatic pictograms and carved-animal reliefs. The site, near the home place of original wild wheat, was built before the so-called Neolithic Revolution, i.e., the beginning of agriculture and animal husbandry around 9000 BCE. But the construction of Göbekli Tepe implies organization of an advanced order not hitherto associated with Paleolithic, PPNA, or PPNB societies. The site, abandoned around the time the first agricultural societies started, is still being excavated and analyzed, and thus might shed light on the significance it had, if any, for the religions of older, foraging communities, as well as for the general history of religions.

The Pyramid Texts from ancient Egypt, the oldest known religious texts in the world, date to between 2400 and 2300 BCE.

The earliest records of Indian religion are the Vedas, composed c. 1500–1200 BCE during the Vedic Period.

Surviving early copies of religious texts include:

- The Upanishads, some of which date to the mid-first millennium BCE.
- The Dead Sea Scrolls, representing fragmentary texts of the Hebrew Tanakh.
- Complete Hebrew texts, also of the Tanakh, but translated into the Greek language (Septuagint 300–200 BCE), were in wide use by the early 1st century CE.
- The Zoroastrian Avesta, from a Sassanian-era master copy.

== Axial age ==
Some historians have labelled the period from 900 to 200 BCE as the "axial age", a term coined by German-Swiss philosopher Karl Jaspers (1883–1969). According to Jaspers, in this era of history "the spiritual foundations of humanity were laid simultaneously and independently... And these are the foundations upon which humanity still subsists today." Intellectual historian Peter Watson has summarized this period as the foundation time of many of humanity's most influential philosophical traditions, including monotheism in Persia and Canaan, Platonism in Greece, Buddhism and Jainism in India, and Confucianism and Taoism in China. These ideas would become institutionalized in time – note for example Ashoka's role in the spread of Buddhism, or the role of Neoplatonic philosophy in Christianity at its foundation.

The historical roots of Jainism in India date back to the 9th century BCE with the rise of Parshvanatha and his non-violent philosophy.

== Middle Ages ==
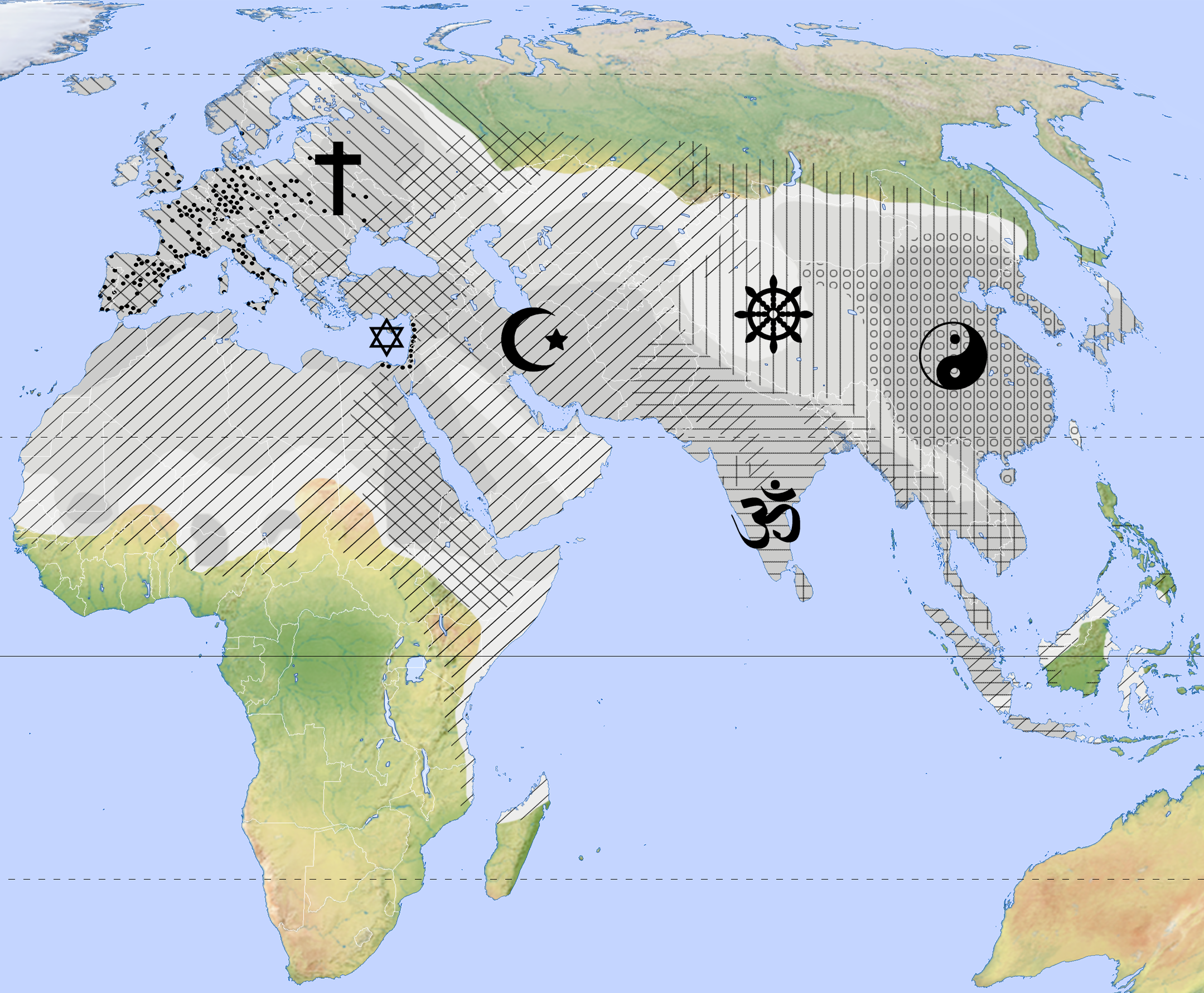
Medieval world religions

World religions of the present day established themselves throughout Eurasia during the Middle Ages by:

- Christianization of the Western world
- Buddhist missions to East Asia
- the decline of Buddhism in the Indian subcontinent
- the spread of Islam throughout the Middle East, Central Asia, North Africa and parts of Europe and India

During the Middle Ages, Muslims came into conflict with Zoroastrians during the Muslim conquest of Persia (633–654); Christians fought against Muslims during the Arab–Byzantine wars (7th to 11th centuries), the Crusades (1095 onward), the Reconquista (718–1492), the Ottoman wars in Europe (13th century onwards) and the Inquisition; Shamanism was in conflict with Buddhists, Taoists, Muslims and Christians during the Mongol invasions and conquests (1206–1337); and Muslims clashed with Hindus and Sikhs during the Muslim conquests in the Indian subcontinent (8th to 16th centuries).

Many medieval religious movements continued to emphasize mysticism, such as the Cathars and related movements in the West, the Jews in Spain (see Zohar), the Bhakti movement in India and Sufism in Islam. Monotheism and related mysticisms reached definite forms in Christian Christology and in Islamic Tawhid. Hindu monotheist notions of Brahman likewise reached their classical form with the teaching of Adi Shankara (788–820).

== Modern Ages ==
From the 15th century to the 19th century, European colonisation resulted in the spread of Christianity to Sub-Saharan Africa, and the Americas, Australia and the Philippines. The invention of the printing press in the 15th century played a major role in the rapid spread of the Protestant Reformation under leaders such as Martin Luther (1483–1546) and John Calvin (1509–1564). Wars of religion broke out, culminating in the Thirty Years' War which ravaged Central Europe between 1618 and 1648. The 18th century saw the beginning of secularisation in Europe, a trend which gained momentum after the French Revolution broke out in 1789. By the late 20th century, religion had declined in most of Europe.

== See also ==
- Christianity and politics
- Growth of religion
- Historiography of religion
- Judaism and politics
- List of founders of religious traditions
- List of religions and spiritual traditions
- List of religious movements that began in the United States
- Political aspects of Islam
- New religious movements
- Religion and politics
- Women and religion
- Women as theological figures

=== Shamanism and ancestor worship ===
- Ancestor worship
- Animism
- Prehistoric religion
- Shamanism
- Tribal religion

=== Panentheism ===
- Eastern Orthodoxy
- Neoplatonism
- Sikhism

=== Polytheism ===
- Ancient Near Eastern religion, Egyptian mythology
- Ancient Greek religion, Ancient Roman religion
- Germanic paganism, Finnish Paganism, Norse paganism
- Maya religion, Inca religion, Aztec religion
- Neopaganism, Polytheistic reconstructionism

=== Monotheism ===
- Aten
- Baháʼí Faith
  - History of the Baháʼí Faith
- History of Christianity
  - History of the Catholic Church
    - History of Catholic theology
  - History of Protestantism
  - History of Jehovah's Witnesses
  - Mormonism
    - History of the Latter Day Saint movement
    - History of The Church of Jesus Christ of Latter-day Saints
- History of Islam
- Judaism
- History of Mandaeism
- Neoplatonism
- Zoroastrianism

=== Monism ===
- History of Buddhism
- History of Hinduism
- History of Jainism

=== Dualism ===
- Gnosticism
- Manichaeism

=== New religious movements ===
- Adventism
- Ahmadiyya
- Bábism
- Bahá'í Faith
- History of Spiritism
- History of Wicca
- Jehovah's Witnesses
- Mormonism
- Nation of Islam
- Pentecostalism
- Rastafari movement
- Spiritualism
- Thelema
- Timeline of Scientology
