= List of religious movements that began in the United States =

A list of notable religious movements that had their origins in the United States or the colonies which would form the United States.

== 18th century ==
- Louisiana Voodoo (c. 1720) (French: Vaudou louisianais) describes a set of spiritual beliefs and practices developed from the traditions of the West and Central African diaspora in Louisiana.
- Old Lights and New Lights (c. 1730 – 1740) were terms first used during the First Great Awakening in British North America to describe those that supported the awakening (New Lights) and those who were skeptical of the awakening (Old Lights). (Note: The terms Old Light and New Lights have been adopted by a wide variety of movements to describe a change and contrast within a wider community.)
- River Brethren (1770).
- Methodist Episcopal Church (1783).
- Universalist Church of America (1793).
- Longhouse Religion (1797)

== 19th century ==
- Black church, 1790s-onward
  - African Union First Colored Methodist Protestant Church and Connection, 1813
  - African Methodist Episcopal Church, 1816
  - Christian Methodist Episcopal Church, 1870
  - National Baptist Convention, USA, Inc., 1880
  - Original Church of God or Sanctified Church, 1890s
  - Church of Christ (Holiness) U.S.A., 1896
  - Church of God in Christ, 1897
  - African Orthodox Church, 1921
  - Mount Sinai Holy Church of America, 1924
  - Church of Universal Triumph, Dominion of God, 1944
  - Black theology, 1966
- Native American Church, 1800 (19th century)
- Reformed Mennonites, 1812
- Restoration Movement, 1800s
- various subgroups of Amish, throughout 19th and 20th centuries
- American Unitarian Association, 1825
  - Unitarian Universalism, 1961 (consolidation of the Universalist Church and the AUA)
- Latter Day Saint movement/Mormonism, 1830
- New Thought Movement, 1830s-onward
  - Divine Science, 1888
  - Unity Church, 1889
  - Science of Mind, 1927
- Adventist/Millerites, 1840s
  - Seventh-day Adventist Church, 1863
- Spiritualism, 1840s
- Christadelphians 1848
- Washat Dreamers Religion, 1850
- Keetoowah Society, 1858
- Jehovah's Witnesses, 1870 (1931)
- Old Order Mennonites, c.1872
- The Theosophical Society (Eastern Theosophy), 1875
- Ethical Culture, 1877 onward
- Church of Christ, Scientist (Christian Science), 1879
- Indian Shaker Church, 1881
- Black Hebrew Israelites, 1886
- Ghost Dance, 1889
- Sun Dance, 1890
- Four Mothers Society, c. 1895
- Polish National Catholic Church, 1897

== 20th century ==
- Pentecostalism, 1901
  - Azusa Street Revival, 1906
  - Oneness Pentecostalism, 1913
  - Pentecostal denominations in North America
- Jewish Science, early 20th century
- Rosicrucian Fellowship (Esoteric Christianity, Western Theosophy, Western mystery tradition), 1909
- Moorish Science Temple of America, 1913
- Reconstructionist Judaism, 1922
- Nation of Islam, founded in Detroit, Michigan by Wallace Fard Muhammad in July 1930
- Dukh-i-zhizniki (Spiritual Christian branch), 1928
- "I AM" Activity, early 1930s
- Urantia Foundation, 1934/1950
- Huna, 1936
- Arcane School / Lucis Trust, 1937
- Church of Aphrodite, 1938
- Scientology, 1954
- Peoples Temple, 1955
- Branch Davidians, 1955
- Church Universal and Triumphant, 1958
- Universal Life Church, 1959
- Feri Tradition, 1950s–60s
- Charismatic movement, 1960
- Discordianism, 1963
- Humanistic Judaism, 1963
- Reformed Druids of North America, 1963
- Moorish Orthodox Church of America, 1964
- Eckankar, 1965
- Church of Satan (LaVeyan Satanism), 1966
  - Temple of Set (Setianism), 1975
- Native Ukrainian National Faith, mid-1960s
- Carlebach movement, late 1960s
- Goddess movement, late 1960s
- Universal Eclectic Wicca, 1969
- Georgian Wicca, 1970
- Neoshamanism
  - Core Shamanism, early 1970s
  - Tensegrity, early 1970s/1995
- Jewish Renewal, mid-1970s
- Church of the SubGenius, 1970s
- Dianic Wicca, 1970s
- Heaven's Gate, 1970s
- Kemetism, 1970s
- Twelve Tribes, 1972
- The Creativity Movement, 1973
- Jews for Jesus, 1973
- Ausar Auset Society, 1973
- Covenant of the Goddess, 1975
- Reclaiming, 1979
- Conservadox Judaism, 1984
- Kabbalah Centre, 1984
- Kemetic Orthodoxy, 1988
- Endeavor Academy (Course in Miracles), 1992
- Dudeism, 1998
- Open Orthodoxy, late 1990s

== 21st century ==
- Jediism, 2001
- Church of the Flying Spaghetti Monster, 2005
- The Genesis II Church of Health and Healing, either 2009 or 2010
- The Satanic Temple, 2012
- Our Lady of Perpetual Exemption, 2015

== See also ==
- Baptists
- Born again
- Calvinism
- Christian fundamentalism
- Christian revival
- Deism
- Dispensationalism
- Evangelicalism
- Mainline Protestant
- Methodism
- Religion and politics in the United States
- Religion in the United States
- Religious history of the United States
- Utopian movements
