= Original Church of God (Pulaski, Tennessee) =

Historic church in Tennessee, United States

- U.S. National Register of Historic Places
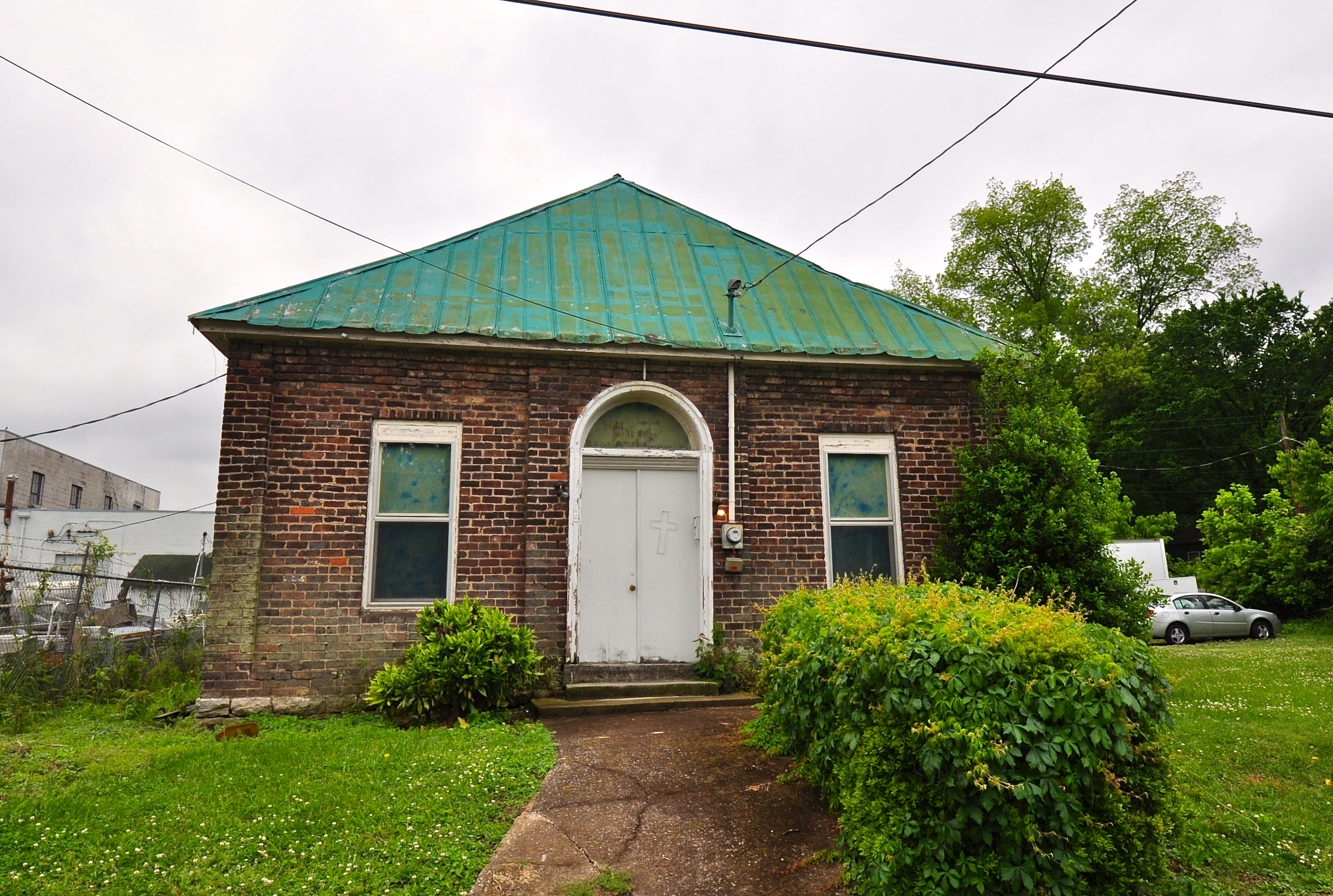
- Original Church of God, May 2014.

- Location within Tennessee Location within the United States
- Location: 115 Gordon St., Pulaski, Tennessee
- Coordinates: 35°12′34″N 87°1′41″W
- Area: less than one acre
- Built: 1907
- Architectural style: Classical Revival
- MPS: Rural African-American Churches in Tennessee MPS
- NRHP reference No.: 06000698
- Added to NRHP: August 09, 2006

Original Church of God (Sanctified Church) is an historic church building at 115 Gordon Street in Pulaski, Tennessee. The brick structure was built in 1907.

The Original Church of God is a denomination aligned with the holiness movement; its membership is predominantly African American. The congregation in Pulaski, which formed in 1906, is the earliest known congregation of this denomination in Tennessee.

The church building was added to the National Register of Historic Places in 2006.
