= Original Church of God or Sanctified Church =

The Original Church of God or Sanctified Church is an association of holiness Christian churches headquartered in Nashville, Tennessee. The members and clergy of the churches are predominantly African-American, though it includes people from many backgrounds. The official name of the body is The Original Church of God or Sanctified Church, General Body.

== History ==
The church's roots are in the holiness movement. In the 1890s a group of African American Baptist ministers, led by Charles Price Jones and Charles Harrison Mason, were dismissed by the Baptist Church for preaching entire sanctification. After a number of unaffiliated revivals, a church was formed in Jackson, Mississippi, by Jones, Mason, and others. Originally called the "Church of God", it was soon renamed the "Church of God in Christ" and had affiliated churches in a number of cities. During this time an elder of the church, Charles W. Gray formed a number of Church of God in Christ churches in and around Nashville.

The Church of God in Christ split in 1907 over the issue of Pentecostalism, with both the Holiness faction and the Holiness Pentecostal faction continuing to use the name "Church of God in Christ" until 1915 when the Holiness Pentecostal faction, led by Mason, incorporated under that name, Church of God in Christ. The (non-pentecostal) Holiness faction led by Jones began using the name Church of Christ (Holiness) U.S.A., and incorporated under that name in 1920. At the time of the 1907 schism, Gray's churches also split from the Church of God in Christ. Though they were also Holiness in doctrine (opposing Pentecostalism) and were doctrinally identical to Jones' faction, they were independent from Jones' body and were congregational in organization. Gray's churches were known by the name "Church of God (Sanctified Church)". In 1927 the Church of God (Sanctified Church) incorporated under the name "Church of God, or Sanctified Church" (subsequently changed to "Church of God Sanctified, Incorporated") and created a board of elders as its governing body. The new board approved the ordination of women, which Gray opposed, and in that same year Gray and a group of members broke away to form a new body, the "Original Church of God or Sanctified Church." Both holiness movement-aligned bodies still exist.

Gray remained the leader of the church until his death in 1945, followed by William Crosby until 1952, and T.R. Jeffries.

== Churches and membership ==
The body includes about 63 churches. As of the 1970s, it had about 5,000 members.

== See also ==
- Original Church of God (Pulaski, Tennessee)
