= Charles Price Jones =

American bishop

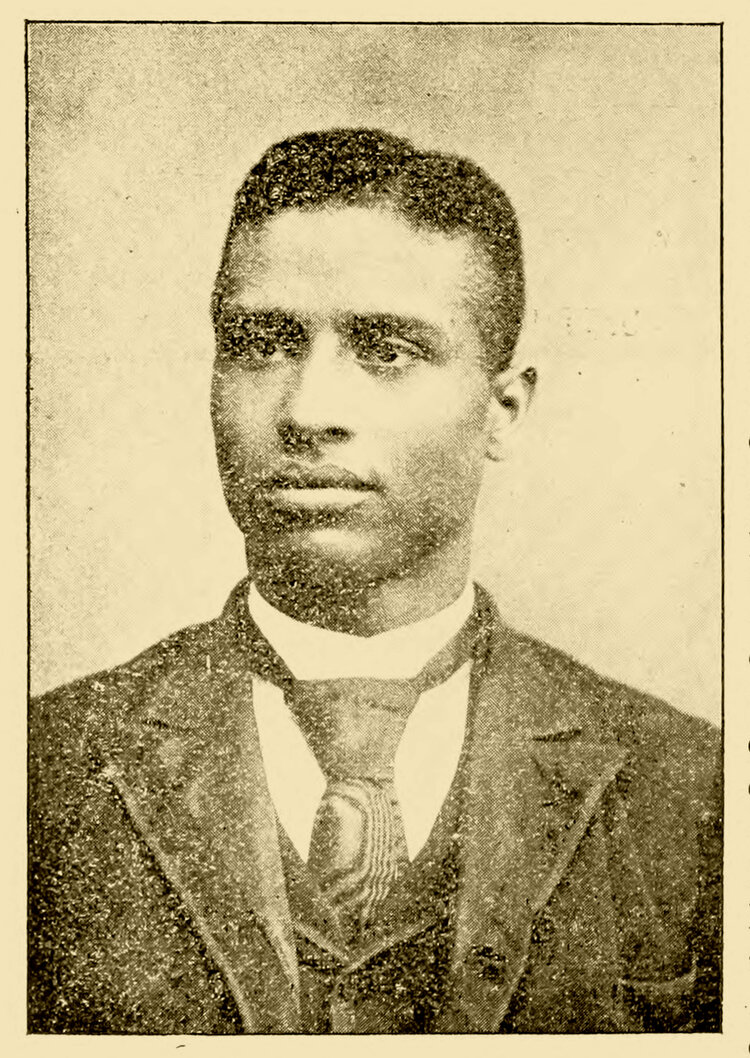
Portrait from The History of Negro Baptists in Mississippi, 1898

Charles Price Jones Sr. (December 9, 1865 – January 19, 1949) was an American religious leader and hymnist. He was the founder of the Church of Christ (Holiness) U.S.A.

== Life ==
Jones was born in Floyd County, Georgia into a Methodist home, but converted in 1884 in a Baptist church in Arkansas. He enrolled in Arkansas Baptist College in 1887. He held several pastorates in Arkansas, before eventually moving to Mount Helm Baptist Church in Jackson, Mississippi in 1895.

Later in 1895, Jones met Charles Harrison Mason and, with two other preachers, began to promote a Baptist holiness movement. This was controversial because the theory of entire sanctification as taught by the Wesleyan-Holiness movement was not accepted by Baptists, who tended to hold to progressive sanctification. Yet, in 1896, Jones established a Baptist holiness newspaper, Truth, and Jones and Mason began holding holiness conventions in Mississippi.

In 1897, Jones and Mason started their own non-denomination holiness movement and called it the Church of God in Christ. Mount Helm eventually voted to remove "Baptist" from its name, as Jones argued it should be seen as simply the "Church of Christ."

In 1907, Charles Mason and other ministers returned from the Azusa Street Revival in Los Angeles led by William Joseph Seymour and held the view that speaking in tongues was evidence of the baptism in the Holy Spirit. Jones and Mason parted ways and, with them, divided the movement, with Jones maintaining the earlier holiness teaching among congregations that would eventually be called the Church of Christ (Holiness) and Mason teaching Holiness Pentecostalism within the Church of God in Christ.

In 1916, Bishop Jones' wife, Fannie Brown, died in Little Rock, Arkansas. He moved to Los Angeles in 1917 and organized Christ Temple Church of Christ (Holiness) U.S.A. in an upstairs hall at Washington and Central. Jones married Pearl E. Reed on January 4, 1918, to this union three sons were born, Charles Price Jones Jr., Vance Reed Jones and Samuel Sherman Jones. In 1921, the first property bought for Christ Temple was on 37th and Naomi. Then in 1926, a church and parsonage were purchased for $18,000 on the corner of 54th and Hooper.

In 1922 the church created a council of Bishops in the national convocation and he was chosen to be the first Senior Bishop. He actively maintained the spiritual leadership and operated as Senior Bishop of the church until he fell ill in 1943 and underwent major surgery. Because of his declining health, he attended his last convention in 1944 in Chicago, Illinois, where he was elected Senior Bishop and President Emeritus of the National Convention for life.

Jones died in Los Angeles on January 19, 1949; his homegoing service was held at Christ Temple Church (54th and Hooper) on January 25, 1949, at 1:00pm. He is buried with his wife Pearl, who died on August 13, 1972, at Evergreen Cemetery, Los Angeles. He was succeeded by Bishop Major Rudd Conic who in 1967 relocated Christ Temple Church to its current location on 54th and 10th Ave.

== Hymns ==
In 1899, Jones began to author hymns for his church. Some of his known hymns which are still sung around the world are Deeper, Deeper; I Will Make the Darkness Light; Come Unto Me; Where Shall I Be; I'm Happy With Jesus Alone; and Jesus Only.
