= Church of Christ (Holiness) U.S.A. =

Church in Mississippi

- Classification: Methodist
- Orientation: Holiness
- Theology: Wesleyan
- Polity: Episcopal
- Region: United States
- Founder: Charles Price Jones
- Origin: 1896; Jackson, Mississippi
- Separations: Church of God in Christ (separated 1907), Associated Church of Christ Holiness (separated 1947) Church of God, Holiness (based in Atlanta, GA - 1922)

The Church of Christ (Holiness) U.S.A. is a denomination of Christianity aligned with the holiness movement. The body is headquartered in Jackson, Mississippi. In 2010, there were 14,000 members in 154 churches. The denomination traces its history to its founder Charles Price Jones, a minister who had embraced Holiness Methodist doctrine.

== History ==
The Church of Christ (Holiness) U.S.A. shares an early history with the Church of God in Christ. Charles Price Jones, a Missionary Baptist preacher in Alabama and later Mississippi, accepted the doctrines of Holiness Methodism around 1896. During this time C.P. Jones became associated with W. S. Pleasant, J. A. Jeter, Charles Harrison Mason, along with other Holiness leaders. In 1897, C.P. Jones conducted a Holiness convention from June 6–15 at the church he pastored, Mt. Helm Baptist Church, in Jackson, Mississippi. In 1898, the name Mt. Helm Baptist Church was changed to Church of Christ. This new group of Holiness leaders was expelled from the Jackson Baptist Association. From that expulsion, they adopted the name Christ Association of Mississippi of Baptized Believers in Christ in 1900, and the national Holiness movement accepted the name by C. H. Mason—Church of God in Christ—in 1906. In that same year, an annual convocation selected J. A. Jeter, C. H. Mason, and D. J. Young to investigate the Azusa Street Revival conducted by William J. Seymour. C.H. Mason and D. J. Young accepted William Seymour's teaching concerning the baptism of the Holy Spirit and returned with such doctrinal message with great enthusiasm. After an extended discussion on the issue of the baptism of the Holy Spirit, at the 1907 convention, the assembly withdrew the right hand of fellowship from C. H. Mason, D. J. Young and others who held to the doctrine of speaking in tongues. C. P. Jones retained the doctrine of the holiness movement, while C. H. Mason held to Holiness Pentecostalism. Congregations led by Charles W. Gray also retained the original teaching of the holiness movement and though identical in doctrine to those led by C.P. Jones, they left and formed the Original Church of God.

The name Church of God in Christ was widely held by both groups until 1907, when Bishop C. H. Mason had the name COGIC, incorporated. Churches of the Holiness division began to use the name Church of Christ Holiness, and in October 1920 was chartered in the state of Mississippi as the Church of Christ (Holiness) U.S.A..

== Theology ==
The Church of Christ (Holiness) U.S.A. is trinitarian with a Holiness emphasis. Water baptism of believers by immersion and the Lord's supper as a memorial are held to be ordinances of the church. Foot washing is also practiced, but it is not regarded as an ordinance. The church does not reject speaking in tongues (glossolalia). The church emphasizes that the Holy Spirit is an indispensable gift to every believer, but places no emphasis on an initial evidence as speaking in tongues to be the results of such gift.

== Leadership ==
The church is episcopal in structure with a Senior Bishop as the highest official and spiritual leader. The church in the United States is divided into eight dioceses - Eastern, North Central, Northern, Pacific North West, South Central, South Eastern, South Western, and Western. In 2008 the Church of Christ (Holiness) had 15,000 members in 167 congregations in the United States, the Dominican Republic and Africa.

Board of Bishops

• Bishop Vernon Kennebrew – Senior Bishop and Presiding Bishop of the Southwestern Diocese. • Bishop Lindsay E. Jones – National President and Presiding Bishop of the North Central Diocese • Bishop Emery Lindsay – Presiding Bishop of the Western Diocese & Pacific Northwest Diocese • Bishop Dale Cudjoe - First Vice President and Presiding Bishop of the Northern Diocese • Bishop H.Vonzell Castilla- Second Vice President,(newly elected and consecrated) Bishop of the Southeastern Diocese (July 2016) • Bishop Maurice Nicholson – Presiding Bishop of the Eastern Diocese • Bishop Robert Winn – Retired and Chairman of the COCHUSA World Mission Board • Bishop Victor Smith - Retired • Bishop Carl Austin - Retired

Its annual "National Convention" is held during the month of July. The church celebrated its 124th National Convention in July 2020, in Dallas, Texas.
