= Endeavor Academy =

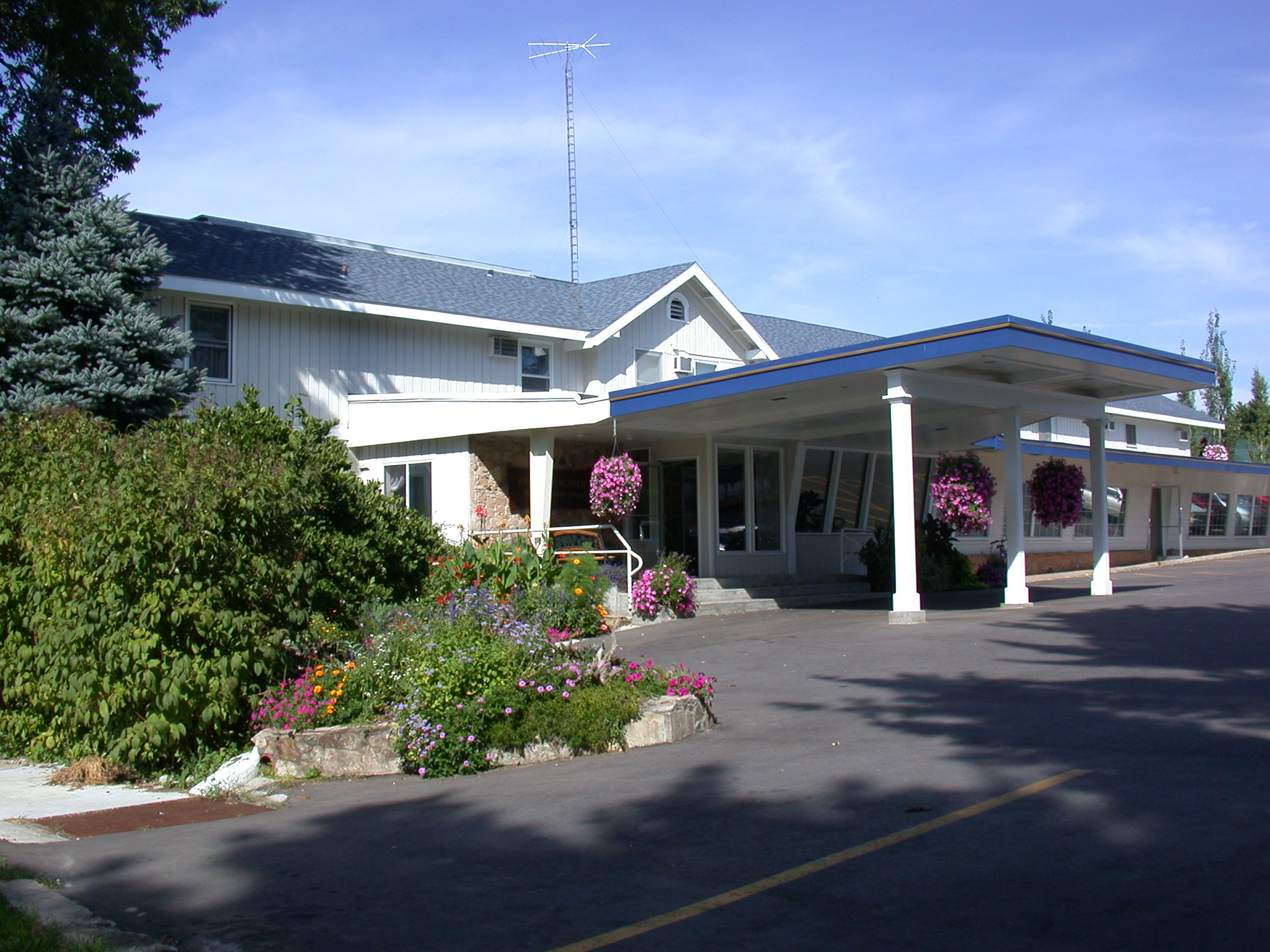
Entrance of Endeavor Academy Wisconsin Dells, Wisconsin

Endeavor Academy, founded in 1992 as the New Christian Church of Full Endeavor, was a community of students of Charles Buell Anderson, which focused primarily on the teachings found in the book A Course in Miracles (or ACIM). Anderson's teachings also incorporate elements from the New Testament, and from other various spiritual and religious leaders. The community lists itself as an "international school of enlightenment", and also as a seminary.

The stated purpose of the community was to provide its members with a "universal experience of oneness that is ideally the goal of every spiritual tradition." The Academy Journal promises "an intensive encounter with Singular Reality and a forum for the complete transformation to enlightenment that is the inevitable destiny of mankind." Standard teaching sessions were provided for students on a daily basis, and an introductory session for the public was given each Sunday. The organization was headquartered in Wisconsin Dells, Wisconsin, USA and had affiliate centers in Poland, Germany, the Netherlands, Spain, Colombia, Ecuador, Venezuela, and Mexico.

== Founding and leadership ==
Endeavor Academy was founded in 1992 by Charles Buell Anderson (b. ca. 1926, d. 2008). Anderson described his 'Spiritual Awakening' as a spontaneous experience he had in 1979. A certain pair of earlier extraordinary experiences Anderson had may offer some insight into Anderson's later experience of 'Spiritual Awakening'.

The first of these two earlier extraordinary experiences was Anderson's World War II experience in Nagasaki, Japan. This experience appears to have made a deeply profound and formative impression upon him. In a letter to the Atomic Veteran's History Project, Anderson described how, with the Marines 6th Regiment, he was one of the first to land at Nagasaki after the atomic bombing of that city in 1945, where he was faced with a vast and overwhelming feeling of the devastation he was witnessing:

On "one particular day", at "one particular moment in time", I found myself standing directly in the center of this unspeakable, indeed unthinkable, devastation that had to have been caused by someone or something. At "that one time" I was filled with complete rage, a wrenching, seething, frustrating, insatiable need for revenge. But against what or whom? It had no point of location, no focus of causation - in effect, no one to blame, no one to hold responsible. It became a passion of intense revulsion for myself, for this world and for any and all members of the human species - a contained certainty from deep within me that all of us, everyone on this earth, all were totally guilty together. And then at "that one moment in time", the light of an inner peace enveloped me. It became "a space in time" where a new resolution appeared, and with it, the message, "Look at this as a new beginning."

Anderson wrote that his second such experience came 26 years later in 1971, during a near-death experience he had. Anderson wrote that during this second such experience, he had a certain "space of peace and happiness" while lying on what he presumed would be his deathbed, and that also during this second event, he received a spontaneous healing from cirrhosis of the liver.

In an interview with CBS News, Anderson denied having followers, teaching that "the Light is in everyone" and that "You are the light of the world." He claimed to be "returning to heaven" "shortly", and said that "everybody" will be going with him. "There's nothing dangerous about me," Anderson explained, "I am the danger of eternal love."

Since Anderson's passing in 2008, the academy and its affiliates have so far continued to remain active, and have continued to produce and disseminate instructional materials.

Following Anderson's passing, the nature of, and names of, the ongoing leadership of the academy is unknown.

== Publicity ==
At the end of 2006 film director Jubi Onyeama and producer Cameron Kennedy, both students of Endeavor Academy, started to interview approximately 120 fellow students. In April 2007 Endeavor Academy sent a film crew to Edinburgh, Scotland to interview additional students and teachers from affiliated centers in Europe. The film was shot over an approximately 2-year period and required more than 200 hours of shooting for the 4-part documentary. The movie, "A Course in Miracles Unleashed" was released on Labor Day 2008. The movie was first screened at Sundance Cinema Madison, WI and received much attention on IMDb. Within the first year of release, the documentary had been subtitled in Dutch, German, Polish, Spanish and Swedish. The documentary about the individual awakening of the students from Endeavor Academy was also screened at the Parliament of World Religions 2009 in Melbourne, Australia. Teachers from Endeavor Academy also represented A Course in Miracles at the 2004 Parliament of World Religions in Barcelona, Spain and at the 2000 Millennium World Peace Summit at the United Nations in New York City.

== History ==
Anderson received a copy of A Course in Miracles ca. 1982. In 1991, he first registered the organization in Reedsburg, Wisconsin, USA under its original name, which was "God’s Country Place" (GCP). This organization was based on many of the teachings of ACIM, as well as some Biblical and AA (Alcoholics Anonymous) materials. By 1999, Endeavor Academy had grown to accommodate 500 residents.

In 1992, the organization was registered to operate under the names Endeavor Academy and New Christian Church of Full Endeavor. Around this time, the use of the GCP name was discontinued.

Endeavor Academy's headquarters was a converted summer resort facility located in a diverse area of water parks and tourist attractions in the middle of Wisconsin Dells. The original facility of 1991 was a large main house, but in 1992 a summer resort motel complex was acquired and converted to meet its needs.

In 1994, they opened the doors of the Miracles Healing Center for the first time. A 400-acre (1.6 km^{2}) lot with the Miracles Healing Center in the middle. The lot holds also the Revelation Hall where big International events were held and four houses for the residential community are located.

== Activities ==
Every Sunday, "Bible Alive" services are held in their Miracles Healing Center building on Highway 23 in Wisconsin Dells. On the roadside, they have a billboard promoting their Miracles Healing Center with "Always Open, Everyone Welcome". On their website is an email address and phone number for prayer requests that can be reached 24/7. In that same building twice a week, 12-step and AA-meetings are hosted by Academy teachers and students as a service to the community.

For several years now, students have participated in helping inmates by offering them the 12-step program through their Miracles Prisoner Ministry. The Miracles Prisoner Ministry is supporting the Christian Association for Prison Aftercare, Wisconsin Network for Peace & Justice, Madison-area Urban Ministry, Inc.

== Litigation related to the A Course in Miracles text ==
Endeavor Academy's primary text, A Course in Miracles, was published and distributed between 1995 and 2000 by Penguin Books. As a result of litigation with Endeavor Academy the Foundation for Inner Peace (FIP) copyright claims were largely voided in 2003 on the grounds of general distribution prior to obtaining copyright, thus placing the majority of the material previously claimed by FIP as under copyright protection in the public domain. As a result of the copyright litigation, three earlier limited editions or drafts of A Course in Miracles surfaced (the Urtext draft, "Hugh Lynn Cayce" edition, and the "Criswell" edition), which also fell into the public domain. The US Trademark Office canceled both the Servicemark on A Course in Miracles and the Trademark on the acronym, "ACIM" in 2005. EA publishes their own edition of ACIM, called "The Advent of a Great Awakening" edition. This EA edition is currently available in print through many major book retailers. Meanwhile, the Foundation for Inner Peace continues to also publish its version of the ACIM text, which also includes the smaller sections for which the copyright was upheld, and which the FIP claims to still be the only unabridged and complete version of the ACIM text available.

== See also ==
- A Course in Miracles
- Bible
- Twelve-step program
